= List of Grade II historic buildings in Hong Kong =

List of buildings of high historical significance in Hong Kong

Grade II historic buildings are those of special merit in Hong Kong. Efforts are required to preserve the building selectively.

Note: This list is accurate as of 6 November 2009. A territory-wide grade reassessment has been ongoing since. See this link for the latest grading update.

== Central and Western District ==
ID	Name	Location	Coordinates	Notes/References	Photographs
H0296	Elliot Pumping Station & Filters Senior Staff Quarters	Pok Fu Lam Road, Kennedy Town			Upload another image
H0050	Ex-Commodore's House	Bowen Road, Central		Houses Mother's Choice Limited	Upload another image
H0531	First Church of Christ, Scientist (Hong Kong)	No. 31 MacDonnell Road, Central			Upload another image
H0489	Former Peak School	No. 7 Gough Hill Path, The Peak		Used as the Victoria Peak Fire Station since 1967.	Upload another image
H0143	Fung Ping Shan Building, University of Hong Kong	No. 94 Bonham Road		Houses the University Museum and Art Gallery	Upload another image
H0202	King's College	No. 63A Bonham Road, Sai Ying Pun			Upload another image
H0033	Kom Tong Hall	No. 7 Castle Road, Mid-Levels		Houses the Dr Sun Yat-sen Museum since December 2006	Upload another image
H1092	Kwong Fook Tsz	Tai Ping Shan Street, Sheung Wan			Upload another image
H0068	Old Dairy Farm Depot	No. 2 Lower Albert Road, Central		Houses the Fringe Club and the Foreign Correspondents' Club	Upload another image
H0710	Old Kei Yan Primary School	Glenealy, Central			Upload Photo
H0357	Old Lunatic Asylum	No. 45 Eastern Street, Sai Ying Pun		Now the Eastern Street Methadone Clinic.	Upload another image
H0222	Old Peak Café	No. 121 Peak Road, The Peak		Renamed The Peak Lookout in 2001.	Upload another image
H0102	Cassels Block of Old Victoria Barracks	No. 7A Kennedy Road, Central		Houses the Hong Kong Visual Arts Centre since 1992	Upload another image
H0182	Montgomery Block of Old Victoria Barracks	No. 42B Kennedy Road, Central		Houses Mother's Choice Limited	Upload another image
H0123	Rawlinson House of Old Victoria Barracks	No. 19 Cotton Tree Drive, Central		Converted in the 1980s into Cotton Tree Drive Marriage Registry and the Office of Hong Kong Park	Upload another image
H0170	Roberts Block of Old Victoria Barracks	No. 42A Kennedy Road, Central			Upload another image
H0101	Wavell Block of Old Victoria Barracks	Hong Kong Park, Cotton Tree Drive, Central		Converted in 1991 into the Edward Youde Aviary support centre	Upload another image
H1087	Peak Depot	No. 102 Old Peak Road, The Peak			Upload another image
H0207	Pedder Building	No. 12 Pedder Street, Central			Upload another image
H0034	Sacred Heart Chapel	No. 36A Caine Road, Central			Upload another image
H0040	The Church of Christ in China Hop Yat Church (Hong Kong Church)	Bonham Road, Mid-Levels			Upload another image
H0085	Chinese YMCA of Hong Kong (Central Building)	Bridges Street, Sheung Wan		Built in 1918 in Eclectic architectural style with Chicago School influence. The architects were Shattuck and Hussey of Chicago.	Upload another image
H0064	Old British Military Hospital	Nos. 10 & 12 Borrett Road		Houses Carmel School, along with a number of youth charities and childcare organisations.	Upload another image
H0408	St. Paul's Co-educational College	No. 33 MacDonnell Road, Central		http://www.aab.gov.hk/form/AAB-SM-chi.pdf	Upload another image

== Eastern District ==
ID	Name	Location	Coordinates	Notes/References	Photographs
H0321	Oi! arts organisation, former Clubhouse of the Royal Hong Kong Yacht Club	No. 12 Oil Street, North Point			Upload another image
H0178	Lyemun Barracks Block 07	Lei Yue Mun, Chai Wan			Upload another image
H0817	Shing Wong Temple	Kam Wa Street, Shau Kei Wan			Upload another image
H0701	Tin Hau Temple	No. 53, Shau Kei Wan Main Street East, Shau Kei Wan			Upload another image
H0478	Woodside	No. 50 Mount Parker Road, Quarry Bay			Upload another image

== Islands District ==
ID	Name	Location	Coordinates	Notes/References	Photographs
H1012	Tin Hau Temple	Nos. 69A & 69B Wing On Street, Peng Chau			Upload another image
H0889	Hau Wong Temple	Tung Chung, Lantau Island			Upload another image
H0482	Hung Shing Temple	No. 1A Chung Hing Street, Cheung Chau Wan, Cheung Chau			Upload another image
H0630	Tin Hau Temple	Near Pak She San Tsuen, Cheung Chau Wan, Cheung Chau			Upload another image
H0594	Tin Hau Temple	Chung Hing Street, Cheung Chau			Upload another image

== Kowloon City District ==
ID	Name	Location	Coordinates	Notes/References	Photographs
H0428	Holy Trinity Cathedral	No. 135 Ma Tau Chung Road, Kowloon City		Formerly known as Holy Trinity Church	Upload another image
H0414	King George V School	Tin Kwong Road, Ho Man Tin		Grade II since 18 December 2009.	Upload another image
H0122	Kwun Yam Temple	Station Lane, Hung Hom			Upload another image
H0203	St. Teresa's Church	No. 258 Prince Edward Road, Kowloon City			Upload another image
H0522	Sun Hok Building of Bethel Mission of China	Grampian Road, Kowloon City			Upload another image

== Kwun Tong District ==
ID	Name	Location	Coordinates	Notes/References	Photographs
H0859	Sam Shan Kwok Wong Temple	No. 2 Ping Shek Estate, Kwun Tong Road, Ngau Chi Wan 22.331755°N 114.209237°E			Upload another image
H1374	Tin Hau Temple	Ma Wan Tsuen, Lei Yue Mun (Kowloon)			Upload another image

== North District ==
ID	Name	Location	Coordinates	Notes/References	Photographs
H0504	Hau Chung Fuk Tong Communal Hall	Kam Tsin Tsuen, Sheung Shui			Upload another image
H0945	Hung Shing Temple and Pai Fung Temple	Ho Sheung Heung, Sheung Shui			Upload another image
H0169	Liu Ying Lung Study Hall	Po Sheung Tsuen, Sheung Shui Wai, Sheung Shui			Upload another image
H0298	MacIntosh Fort	Kong Shan, Sha Tau Kok			Upload another image
H0303	MacIntosh Fort	Ma Tso Lung, Ta Kwu Ling			Upload another image
H0299	MacIntosh Fort	Nam Hang, Sha Tau Kok			Upload another image
H0300	MacIntosh Fort	Nga Yiu, Sha Tau Kok			Upload another image
H0301	MacIntosh Fort	Pak Fu Shan, Sha Tau Kok			Upload another image
H0302	MacIntosh Fort	Pak Kung Au, Sha Tau Kok			Upload another image
H0940	Man Ming Temple	Fu Tei Au Tsuen, Sheung Shui			Upload Photo
H0144	Shek Lo	Lung Yeuk Tau, Fanling			Upload another image
H0978	Fan Ling Chung Wai	Fanling			Upload another image
H0805	Half-Way House	Hong Kong Golf Club, Fanling			Upload another image
H0377	Hau Mei Fung Ancestral Hall	Kam Tsin Tsuen, Sheung Shui			Upload another image
H0338	Hip Tin Temple and Hok Shan Monastery	Lai Chi Wo, Sha Tau Kok			Upload another image
H1044	Hung Shing Temple	Hung Leng, Fanling			Upload another image
H0163	Shin Shut Study Hall	No. 20 San Uk Tsuen, Lung Yeuk Tau, Fanling			Upload another image
H0600	Tin Hau Temple	Ping Che, Ta Kwu Ling			Upload another image
H0191	Tung Kok Wai	Lung Yeuk Tau, Fanling			Upload another image
H0822	Wing Ning Wai	Lung Yeuk Tau, Fanling			Upload another image

== Sai Kung District ==
ID	Name	Location	Coordinates	Notes/References	Photographs
H0037	Che Kung Temple	Ho Chung Road, Ho Chung		The temple is of a two-hall design with two annex buildings at both sides.	Upload another image
H1111	Tin Hau Temple	Hang Hau			Upload another image
H0617	Tin Hau Temple	Leung Shuen Wan Chau (High Island)			Upload another image

== Sha Tin District ==
ID	Name	Location	Coordinates	Notes/References	Photographs
H0575	Che Kung Temple	Che Kung Miu Road, Tai Wai		Only the original temple is graded. The rest of the complex was built in 1993 and after.	Upload another image
H0225	Kowloon Byewash Reservoir Dam	Kam Shan Country Park			Upload another image
H0272	Kowloon Byewash Reservoir Valve House	Kam Shan Country Park			Upload another image
H0273	Shek Lei Pui Reservoir Dam (northeast)	Kam Shan Country Park			Upload another image
H0274	Shek Lei Pui Reservoir Dam (southeast)	Kam Shan Country Park			Upload another image
H0275	Shek Lei Pui Reservoir Valve House	Kam Shan Country Park			Upload another image
H0562	Tao Fong Shan Christian Centre	No. 33 Tao Fong Shan Road			Upload another image

== Sham Shui Po District ==
ID	Name	Location	Coordinates	Notes/References	Photographs
H0032	Some buildings/military facilities within the Ngong Shuen Chau Barracks	Stonecutters Island		Some buildings/facilities also Grade I and III	Upload Photo
H0488	Mo Tai Temple	No.158 Hai Tan Street, Sham Shui Po		Dedicated to Kwan Tai/Guan Yu	Upload another image
H0699	No. 117 Nam Cheong Street				Upload another image
H0731	No. 119 Nam Cheong Street				Upload another image
H0732	No. 121 Nam Cheong Street				Upload another image
H0716	No. 123 Nam Cheong Street				Upload another image
H0717	No. 125 Nam Cheong Street				Upload another image
H0587	No. 269 Yu Chau Street				Upload another image
H0588	No. 271 Yu Chau Street				Upload another image
H0411	Sam Tai Tsz Temple and Pak Tai Temple	No. 196-198 Yu Chau Street			Upload another image

== Southern District ==
ID	Name	Location	Coordinates	Notes/References	Photographs
H0228	The Old House	No. 10 Wong Chuk Hang San Wai, Wong Chuk Hang			Upload another image
H0240	Pok Fu Lam Reservoir Box Culvert	Pok Fu Lam Reservoir Road, Pok Fu Lam			Upload another image
H0402	Pok Fu Lam Reservoir Embankment	Pok Fu Lam Reservoir Road, Pok Fu Lam			Upload another image
H0804	Pok Fu Lam Reservoir Air Vents at the Service Reservoir	Pok Fu Lam Reservoir Road, Pok Fu Lam			Upload Photo
H0196	St. Stephen's College	No. 22 Tung Tau Wan Road, Stanley			Upload another image
H0341	Stanley Fort Block 17	Stanley			Upload Photo
H0349	Stanley Fort Block 38	Stanley			Upload Photo
H0638	Stanley Fort Block 51	Stanley			Upload Photo
H0323	Stanley Fort Block 09	Stanley			Upload Photo
H0186	The Béthanie	No. 139 Pok Fu Lam Road			Upload another image
H1069	Tin Hau Temple	No. 182 Aberdeen Main Road, Aberdeen			Upload another image

== Tai Po District ==
ID	Name	Location	Coordinates	Notes/References	Photographs
H1349	Chat Shing Temple	Kwun Hang, Shap Sze Heung			Upload another image
H1101	Hip Tin Temple	Cheung Shue Tan		Village Website	Upload another image
H1076	Pun Chun Yuen, Residence of Wong Siu-wai	No. 17 Shek Lin Road, Kam Shan			Upload another image
H0310	Sha Lo Tung Cheung Uk	Sha Lo Tung			Upload another image
H0792	Sha Lo Tung Lo Wai	Sha Lo Tung			Upload Photo
H0189	Tai Po Lookout	No. 11 Lookout Link			Upload another image
H0527	Tin Hau Temple	Fong Ma Po, Lam Tsuen		Near the Lam Tsuen Wishing Trees.	Upload another image
H1104	Tin Hau Temple	Ting Kok Road, Tai Po Kau Hui			Upload another image
H1281	Tin Hau Temple and Man Tai Temple	Nos. 52-53 Tsz Tong Tsuen, Tai Hang			Upload another image
H0118	Two Old Houses	Pak Sha O Ha Yeung, northern Sai Kung			Upload Photo
H1077	Mo Tai Temple	Ting Kok Village			Upload another image
H0336	Old Police Bungalow	No. 173 & 175 Kwong Fuk Road			Upload another image
H0175	Old Tai Po Police Station	No. 11 Wan Tau Kok Lane			Upload another image

== Tsuen Wan District ==
ID	Name	Location	Coordinates	Notes/References	Photographs
H0226	Dragon Garden	No. 32-42 Castle Peak Road, Tsing Lung Tau		Grade II since 25 September 2006.	Upload Photo
H0366	Tin Hau Temple	Wai Tsuen Road, Tsuen Wan			Upload another image

== Tuen Mun District ==
ID	Name	Location	Coordinates	Notes/References	Photographs
H0417	Shing Miu	Sam Shing Hui, Ching Shan Wan			Upload another image
H1400	Tin Hau Temple	Sha Chau			Upload Photo
H0407	Ching Chung Koon	Tsing Chung Koon Road			Upload another image

== Wan Chai District ==
ID	Name	Location	Coordinates	Notes/References	Photographs
H0094	Haw Par Mansion	Tai Hang Road			Upload another image
H0278	Green House	No. 1,3,5,7,9 and 11 Mallory Street, Wan Chai			Upload another image
H0284	Green House	No. 6,8,10 and 12 Burrows Street, Wan Chai			Upload another image
H0464		No. 18 Ship Street, Wan Chai		tong-lau	Upload another image
H0826		No. 186, 188 and 190 Queen's Road East, Wan Chai		tong-lau	Upload another image
H0787	Yellow House	No. 2 and 4 Hing Wan Street, Wan Chai		tong-lau	Upload another image
H0789		No. 6 and 8 Hing Wan Street, Wan Chai		tong-lau	Upload another image
H0074	Tung Lin Kok Yuen	No. 15 Shan Kwong Road, Happy Valley			Upload another image
H0427	St. Paul's Primary Catholic School	Wong Nai Chung Road, Happy Valley			Upload another image
H0146	Sheng Kung Hui St. Mary's Church	No. 2A Tung Lo Wan Road, Causeway Bay			Upload another image
H0110	St. Margaret's Church	No. 2A Broadwood Road, Causeway Bay			Upload another image
H0087	Christ the King Chapel	St. Paul's Convent, Tung Lo Wan Road, Causeway Bay			Upload another image

== Wong Tai Sin District ==
ID	Name	Location	Coordinates	Notes/References	Photographs
H0045	Sik Sik Yuen Wong Tai Sin Temple	Wong Tai Sin			Upload another image
H1002	Old Pillbox	Tai Hom Village, Diamond Hill		The pillbox was constructed by the Japanese Air Force during the Japanese occupation. It was used as a shelter for the aircrew and technicians.	Upload another image

== Yau Tsim Mong District ==
ID	Name	Location	Coordinates	Notes/References	Photographs
H0047	Signal Tower	Blackhead Point (Tai Pau Mai), Tsim Sha Tsui			Upload another image
H0490	St. Mary's Canossian College	No. 162 Austin Road, Tsim Sha Tsui			Upload another image
H0017	Tin Hau Temple	Temple Street, Yau Ma Tei			Upload another image
H0128	Old South Kowloon District Court	No. 38 Gascoigne Road, Yau Ma Tei			Upload another image
H0127	Rosary Church	No. 125 Chatham Road South, Tsim Sha Tsui			Upload another image
H0042	St. Andrew's Church Compound	No. 138 Nathan Road, Tsim Sha Tsui			Upload another image
H0229	Yau Ma Tei Theatre	Junction of Waterloo Road and Reclamation Street, Yau Ma Tei			Upload another image
H0054	Some buildings within the Gun Club Hill	Gun Club Hill, Austin Road, Tsim Sha Tsui		Some buildings also Grade III	Upload another image

== Yuen Long District ==
ID	Name	Location	Coordinates	Notes/References	Photographs
H0125	Cheung Chun Yuen	No. 82 Shui Tau Tsuen, Kam Tin			Upload another image
H0803	Choi Yi Wah Ancestral Hall	No.27 Shui Lau Tin, Pat Heung			Upload another image
H1046	Hung Shing Temple	No. 31 Shui Tau, Kam Tin			Upload another image
H0934	Kwun Yum Temple	Tung Tau Tsuen, Yuen Long Kau Hui		The temple is connected with the Tin Hau Temple in the front and they are considered as one complex.	Upload another image
H0211	Lik Wing Tong Study Hall	No. 85 Shui Tau Tsuen, Kam Tin			Upload another image
H0469	Ling Mui Chong	Shui Tsan Tin, Pat Heung			Upload another image
H1075	Ling To Monastery	Ha Tsuen			Upload another image
H0304	MacIntosh Fort (Pak Hok Chau)	Pak Hok Chau, Mai Po			Upload another image
H0318	Man San Ye Ancestral Hall	Fan Tin Tsuen, San Tin			Upload another image
H0406	Ming Yuen Tong Ancestral Hall	Fan Tin Tsuen, San Tin			Upload another image
H0530	Sing Hin Kung Study Hall	Hang Mei Tsuen, Ping Shan			Upload another image
H0851	Tang Chan Yui Kuen Ancestral Hall	No. 201 Shui Mei, Pak Wai Tsuen, Kam Tin			Upload another image
H0167	Tang Kwong U Ancestral Hall	No. 32 Shui Tau, Pak Wai Tsuen, Kam Tin			Upload another image
H0973	Tung Shan Temple	Wing Ping Tsuen, San Tin		Dedicated to Tin Hau.	Upload another image
H1006	Old House	No. 57 Shui Lau Tin, Pat Heung			Upload another image
H0337	Pat Heung Temple	No. 87 Sheung Tsuen, Pat Heung			Upload another image
H0476	Tang Kwok Mou Ancestral Hall	Shui Lau Tin, Pat Heung			Upload another image
H1143	Tin Hau Temple	Tung Tau Tsuen, Yuen Long Kau Hui (Shap Pat Heung)		The temple is connected with the Kwun Yum Temple in the back and they are considered as one complex.	Upload another image
H0914	Tin Hau Temple	Sha Kong Tsuen, Ha Tsuen			Upload another image
H0565	Old Ping Shan Survey Camp of Crown Lands & Survey Office	Ping Shan Lane, Ping Shan			Upload another image
H0526	Hung Shing Temple	Hang Mei Tsuen, Ping Shan		Part of the Ping Shan Heritage Trail.	Upload another image
H0223	Chou Wong Yi Kung Study Hall	Shui Tau Tsuen, Kam Tin			Upload another image
H0307	General House, Main Building	Fung Kat Heung, Kam Tin			Upload another image
H0355	General House, Hip Wai House	Fung Kat Heung, Kam Tin			Upload another image
H0405	General House, Shum Ancestral Hall	Fung Kat Heung, Kam Tin			Upload another image

== See also ==
- List of buildings and structures in Hong Kong
- Heritage conservation in Hong Kong
- Declared monuments of Hong Kong
- List of Grade I historic buildings in Hong Kong
- List of Grade III historic buildings in Hong Kong
- Heritage Trails in Hong Kong
- History of Hong Kong
