= Pak Wai =

Pak Wai may refer to:

- Fanling Pak Wai, part of Fanling Wai
- Pak Wai, Sai Kung District, a village of Sai Kung District
- Pak Wai Tsuen, a village in Yuen Long District
