= Great Clearance =

17th-century evacuations of coastal China

- Traditional Chinese: 遷界令
- Simplified Chinese: 迁界令
Transcriptions
Standard Mandarin
- Hanyu Pinyin: Qiānjiè Lìng
- Wade–Giles: Ch'ien^{1}-chieh^{4} Ling^{4}

Alternative Chinese name
- Traditional Chinese: 遷海令
- Simplified Chinese: 迁海令
- Literal meaning: Coastal Evacuation Order
Transcriptions
Standard Mandarin
- Hanyu Pinyin: Qiānhǎi Lìng
- Wade–Giles: Ch'ien^{1}-hai^{3} Ling^{4}

The Great Clearance (traditional Chinese: 遷界令; simplified Chinese: 迁界令), also translated as the Great Evacuation or Great Frontier Shift, was caused by edicts issued in 1661, 1664, and 1679, which required the evacuation of the coastal areas of Guangdong, Fujian, Zhejiang, Jiangnan, and Shandong, (Note: Jiangnan was divided into two provinces of Jiangsu and Anhui and ceased to exist in Qianlong era of Qing dynasty.) in order to fight the Taiwan-based anti-Qing loyalist movement of the erstwhile Ming dynasty (1368–1644).

The edict was first issued by the Shunzhi Emperor of the Qing dynasty in 1661, the last year of his rule. With the Shunzhi Emperor's death in the same year, his son, the Kangxi Emperor (1661–1722), succeeded this edict under a regency led by Oboi (1661–1669). The ban on human settlement of those coastal areas was lifted in 1669, and some residents were allowed to return. Yet, in 1679, the edict was issued again. In 1683, after the Qing defeated the Kingdom of Tungning in the Battle of Penghu and took control of Taiwan, the people from the cleared areas according to the edict were allowed to return and to live in the cleared areas.

== Purpose ==
The goal was to fight the anti-Qing movement based in Taiwan, begun by Ming dynasty loyalists under the leadership of Zheng Chenggong (Koxinga), who used his influence on the coastal areas to support the movement. The measure was in accordance with a five-point plan to deal with Koxinga, suggested by one of his former lieutenants who had gone over to the Qing. Its adoption was due to a conviction that Koxinga's campaigning against the new dynasty could not be continued if aid and supplies were denied him in this way.

== A study of Haijin in Xin'an County ==
=== Enforcement ===
Enforcement of this drastic measure was extended to Xin'an County (which covered roughly the territory of modern-day Shenzhen and Hong Kong) and adjacent counties of Guangdong in 1661. Two inspections determined the areas to be cleared. At the time of the first inspection up to a distance of 50 li from the coast, it was calculated that two-thirds of the territory of the County would be affected. A year later the boundary was extended further inland, and what remained of the County was to be absorbed into the adjoining Dongguan County. By the 5th year of Kangxi, Xin'an had ceased to be a separate administrative county. When the new boundaries were fixed, the inhabitants living outside them were given notice to move inland. These orders were enforced by troops. The result was that whole communities were uprooted from their native place, deprived of their means of livelihood and compelled to settle where they could. The rural people risked their lives if they ignored the government edict to move, or ventured back into the prohibited area. It is recorded that about 16,000 persons from Xin'an were driven inland. What is now the territory of Hong Kong became largely wasteland during the ban.

=== End of the ban ===
The ban was lifted in 1669, following a request by the Governor-General of Guangdong and Guangxi Zhou Youde (周有德) and Governor of Guangdong Wang Lairen (王來任), and residents were allowed to return to their original homes. Only 1,648 of those who left are said to have returned when the evacuation was rescinded in 1669.

When the ban was lifted in 1668, the coastal defense was reinforced. Twenty-one fortified mounds, each manned with an army unit, were created along the border of Xin'an County, and at least five of them were located in present-day Hong Kong.

1. The Tuen Mun Mound, believed to have been built on Castle Peak or Kau Keng Shan, was manned by 50 soldiers.
2. The Kowloon Mound on Lion Rock and
3. The Tai Po Tau Mound northwest of Tai Po Old Market had each 30 soldiers.
4. The Ma Tseuk Leng Mound stood between present-day Sha Tau Kok and Fan Ling and was manned by 50 men.
5. The fifth one at Fat Tong Mun, probably on today's Tin Ha Shan Peninsula, was an observation post manned by 10 soldiers.

In 1682, these forces were re-organized and manned by detachments from the Green Standard Army with reduced strength.

=== Legacy ===
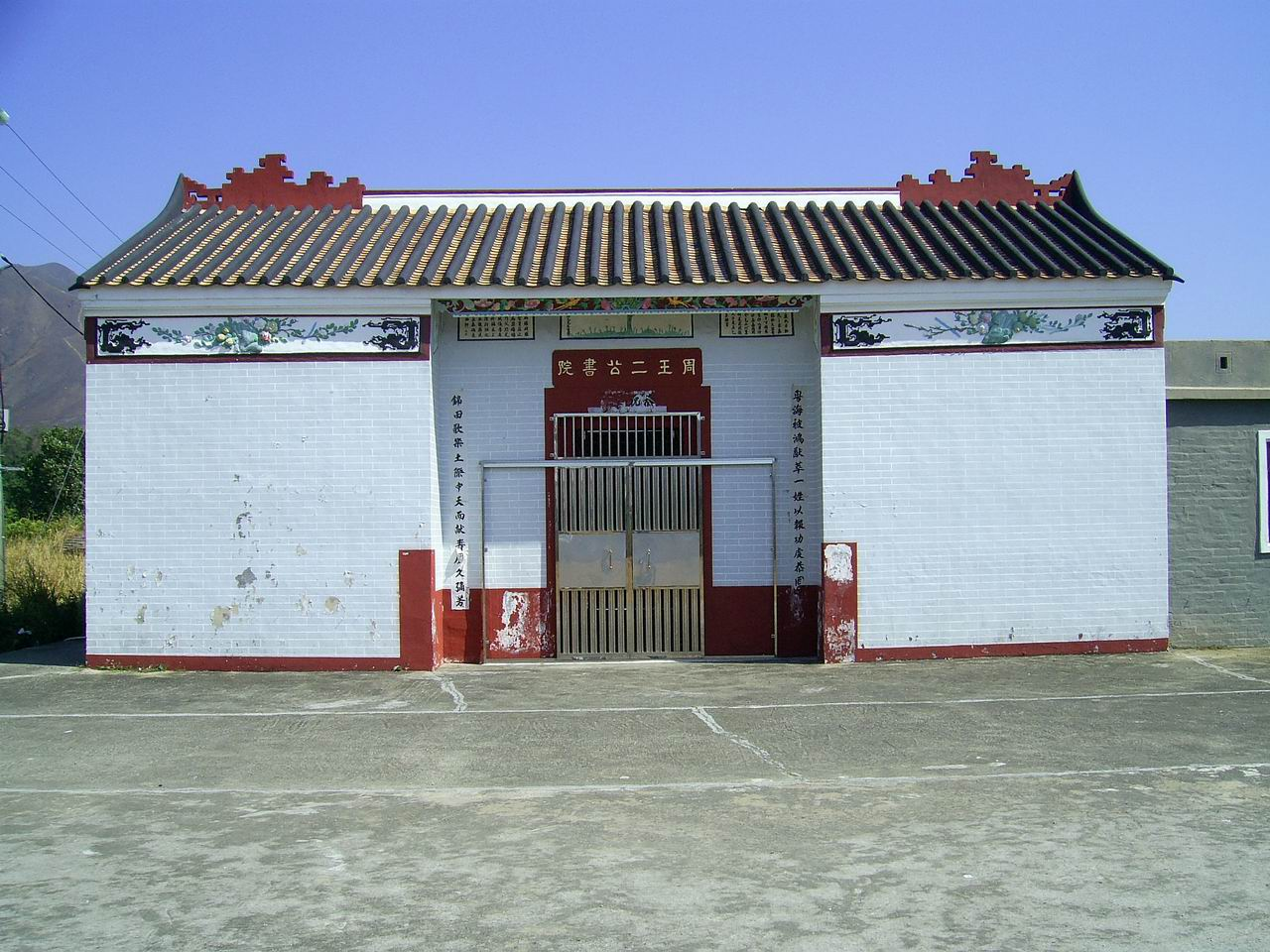
The Chou Wong Yi Kung Study Hall in Shui Tau Tsuen was erected in 1685 by the Tang Clan in honour of Zhou Youde and Wang Lairen.

The evacuation of the coast followed prolonged earlier years of miseries and had a profound effect on the lives of the population and on the pattern of future settlement. The survivors' hardships did not end when they returned to take up their interrupted lives in their old homes, for it is recorded that destructive typhoons in 1669 and 1671 destroyed the new houses in many places. The Evacuation has had a great impact on the minds of local people and their descendants. It is recalled in the genealogies and traditions of some of the longsettled clans of the County: it is commemorated in the construction and continued repair of temples to the two officials who strove to have the order rescinded. An example is the Chou Wong Yi Kung Study Hall in Shui Tau Tsuen, in Kam Tin, Hong Kong, which was erected in 1685 by the Tang Clan in honour of Zhou Youde and Wang Lairen. The event was also remembered centuries later by the manufacture and sale by pedlars of images of the two men, as recorded for the Yuen Long District of the New Territories of Hong Kong at the end of the 19th century.

Hakka dialect-speaking communities are thought to have arrived in the Hong Kong area after the rescinding of the coastal evacuation order. Their immigration into the area was assisted by the government after the order was rescinded. The formerly established Punti clans also came back, expanded their ancestral halls, built study halls and set up market towns in Yuen Long, Tai Po, and Sheung Shui.

Beacon Hill in Hong Kong was named after a beacon, where a garrison was stationed to enforce the decree.

== See also ==
- Haijin
- Punti–Hakka Clan Wars
