= Pak Wai Tsuen =

Village in Kam Tin, Yuen Long District, Hong Kong

Coordinates: 22°26′47″N 114°03′40″E

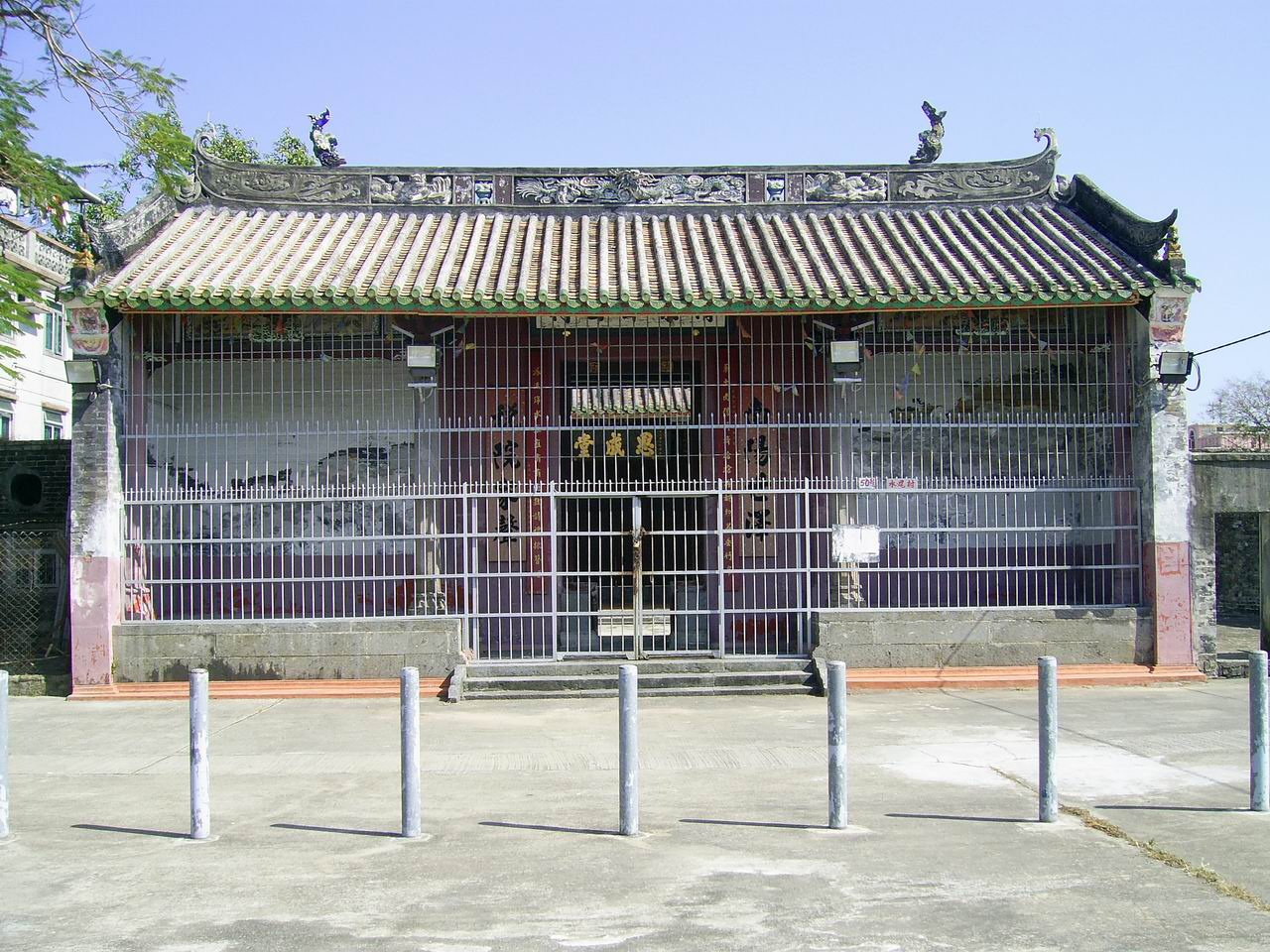
Tang Ching Lok Ancestral Hall in Pak Wai Tsuen.

Pak Wai Tsuen (Chinese: 北圍村) is a village in Kam Tin, Yuen Long District, Hong Kong.

== Administration ==
Pak Wai Tsuen is one of the villages represented within the Kam Tin Rural Committee. For electoral purposes, Pak Wai Tsuen is part of the Kam Tin constituency, which is currently represented by Chris Li Chung-chi.

== See also ==
- Shui Mei Tsuen and Shui Tau Tsuen, two adjacent villages
