= Chou Wong Yi Kung Study Hall =

Historic building in Shui Tau Tsuen, Yuen Long, Hong Kong

- 周王二公書院
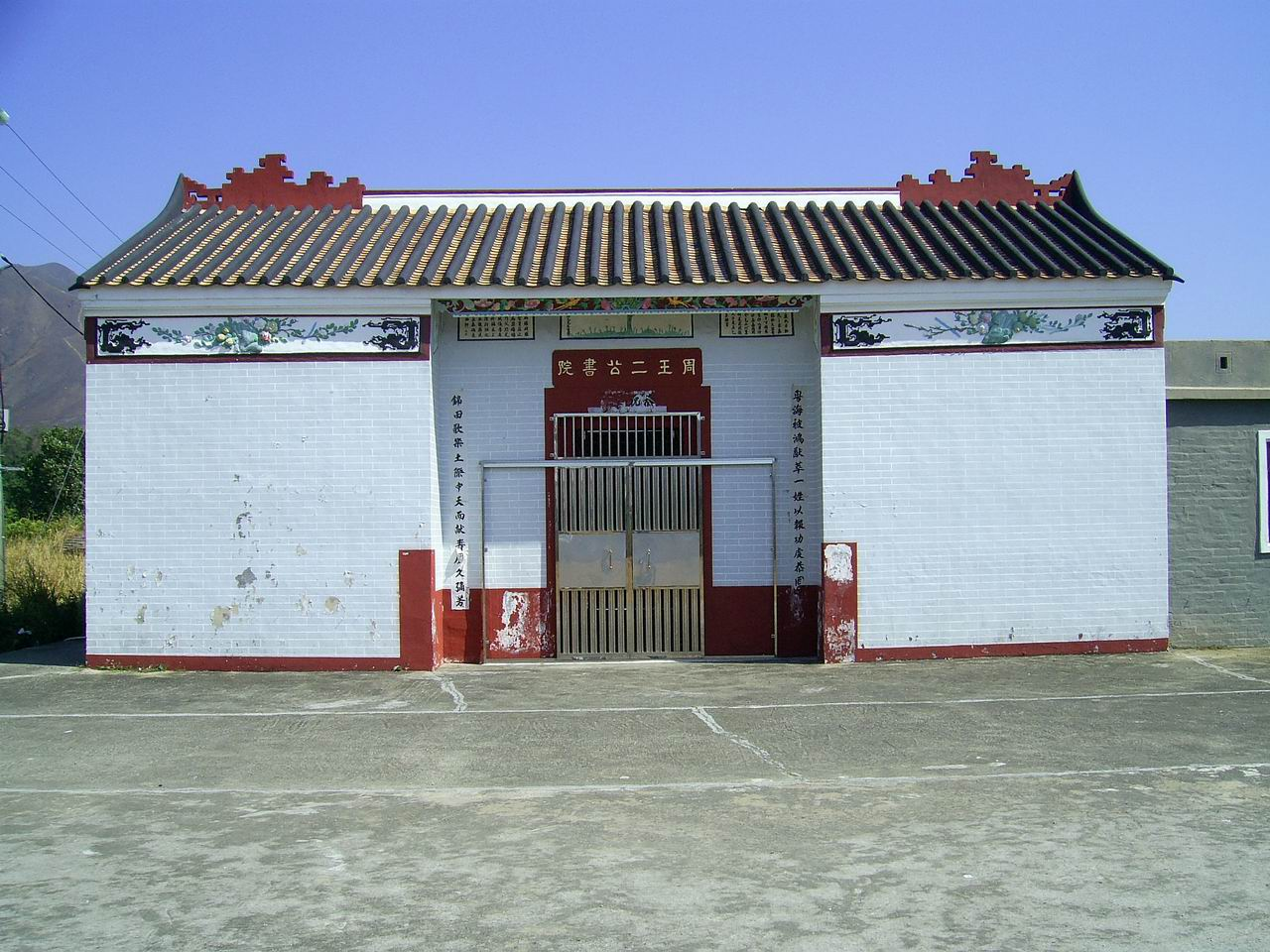
- Interactive map of the Chou Wong Yi Kung Study Hall area

General information
- Location: Kam Tin, Yuen Long, New Territories, Hong Kong
- Coordinates: 22°26′43″N 114°03′48″E
- Completed: 1685

Design and construction
- Designations

Hong Kong Graded Building – Grade II
- Designated: 31 Aug 2010
- Reference no.: 223

Chou Wong Yi Kung Study Hall
- Traditional Chinese: 周王二公書院
- Simplified Chinese: 周王二公书院
Transcriptions
Standard Mandarin
- Hanyu Pinyin: Zhōu Wáng Èr Gōng Shūyuàn
Yue: Cantonese
- Yale Romanization: Jāu wohng yih gūng syū yuhn
- Jyutping: Zau1 wong6 ji6 gung1 syu1 jyun6

The Chou Wong Yi Kung Study Hall is a Grade II historic building in Shui Tau Tsuen, Yuen Long, Hong Kong. It was erected in 1685 by the Tang Clan, in honour of Zhou Youde and Wang Lairen, two imperial officials whose pleading with the Emperor ended the coastal evacuation, and enabled the inhabitants to return to their homes in 1669.

== Architectural style ==
The study hall is constructed in the typical style of the Qing dynasty period. The structure itself consists of two halls on each side of a central courtyard. The complex is designed to be symmetrical with an altar placed in the centre of the structure.
