= Tsz Tong Tsuen =

Tsz Tong Tsuen is the name of several villages in Hong Kong:

- Tsz Tong Tsuen (North District) in North District
- Tsz Tong Tsuen (Tai Po) in Tai Po District
- Tsz Tong Tsuen (Kam Tin) in Kam Tin, Yuen Long District
- Tsz Tong Tsuen (Shek Kong) in Shek Kong, Yuen Long District
