= Shui Tau Tsuen =

Village in Hong Kong

Coordinates: 22.445293°N 114.060616°E

- Traditional Chinese: 水頭村
- Simplified Chinese: 水头村
Transcriptions
Standard Mandarin
- Hanyu Pinyin: Shuǐtóucūn
Yue: Cantonese
- Jyutping: seoi2 tau4 cyun1

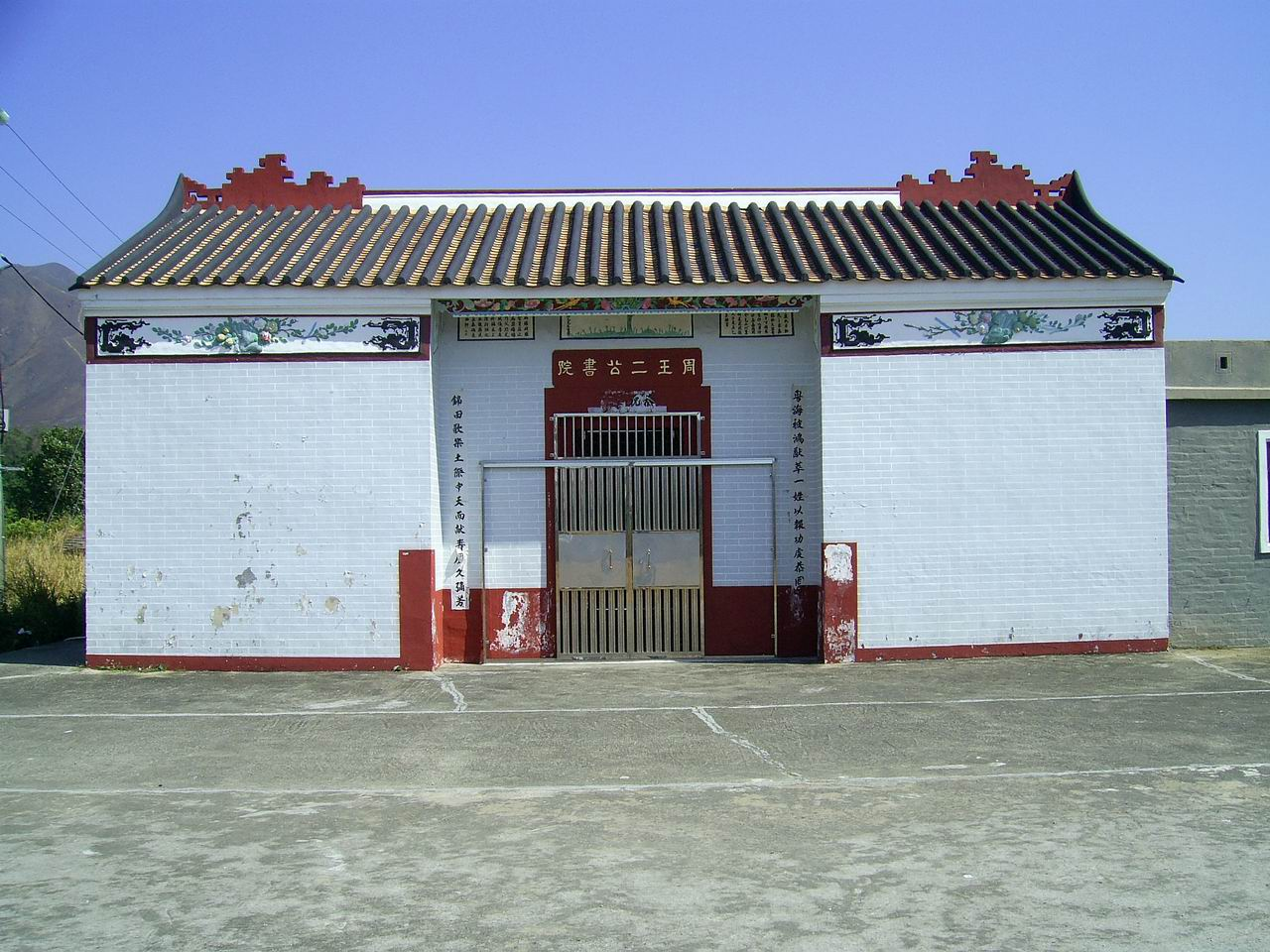
Chou Wong Yi Kung Study Hall in Shui Tau Tsuen.

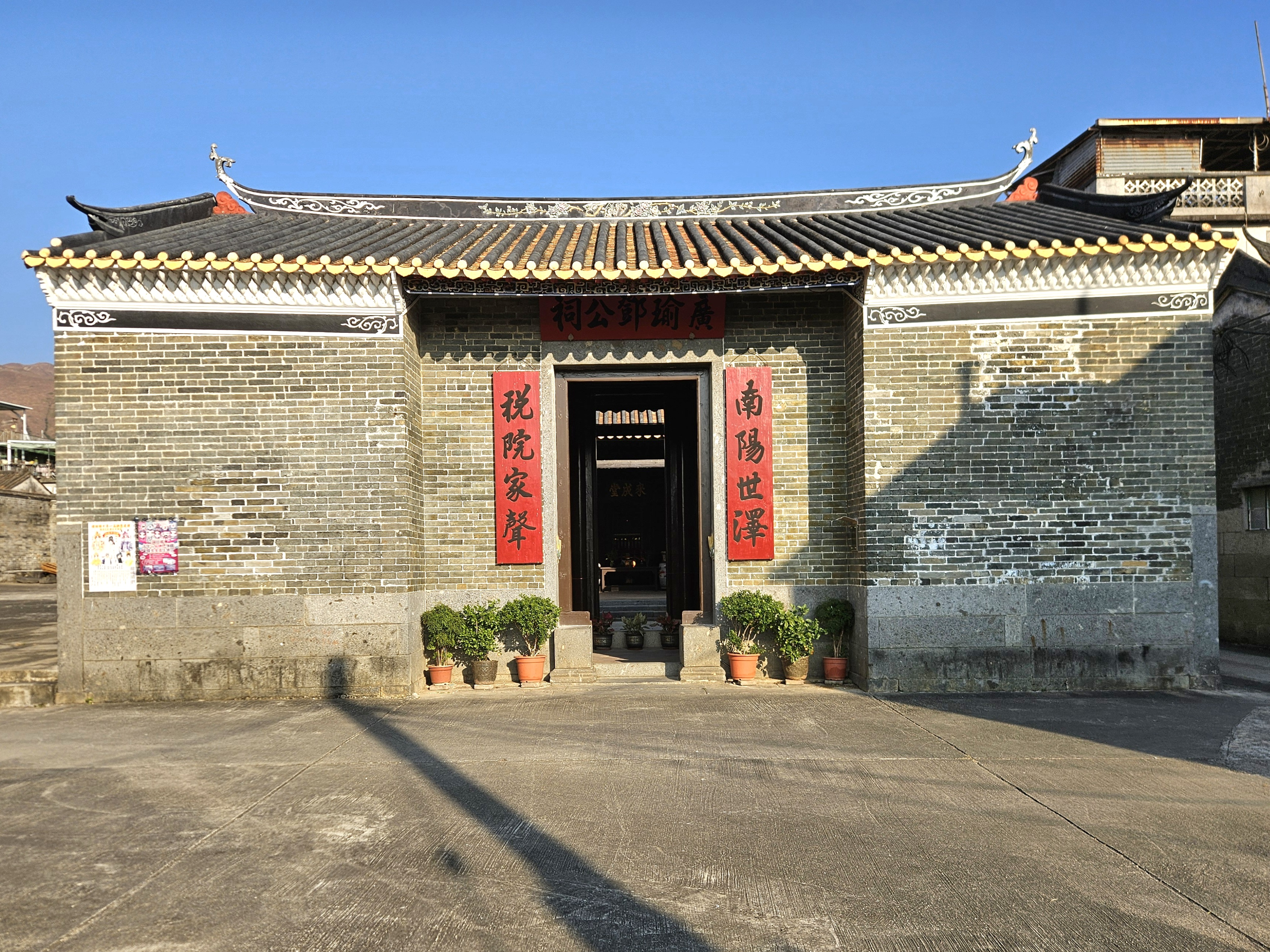
Tang Kwong U Ancestral Hall in Shui Tau Tsuen.

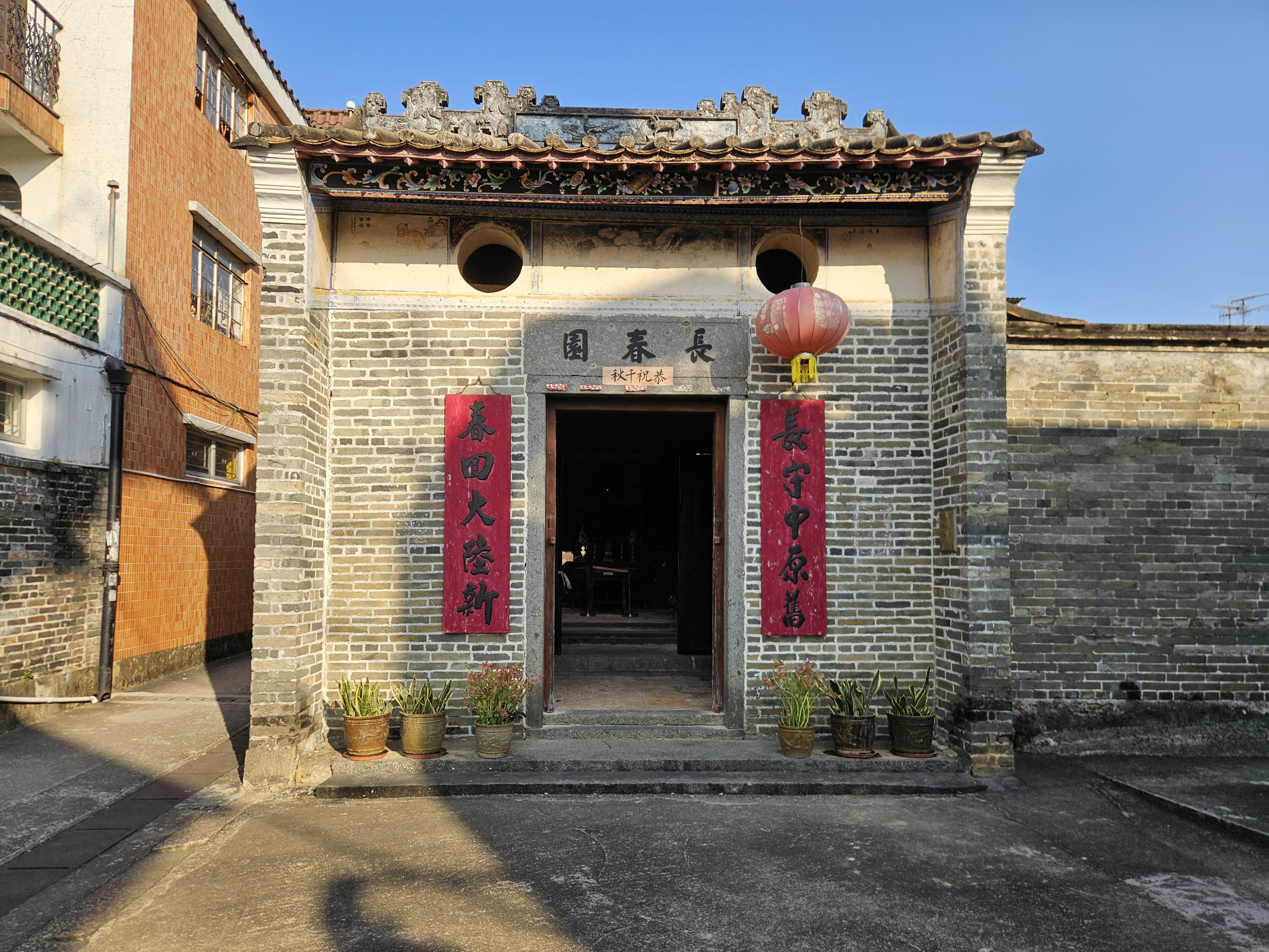
Cheung Chun Yuen in Shui Tau Tsuen.

Shui Tau Tsuen (Chinese: 水頭村) is a 17th century village in Kam Tin area, Yuen Long District, New Territories, Hong Kong. Kam Tin is the origins of Tang Clan (鄧), one of the Five Great Clans of Hong Kong.

== Administration ==
Shui Tau Tsuen is a recognized village under the New Territories Small House Policy. It is one of the villages represented within the Kam Tin Rural Committee. For electoral purposes, Shui Tau Tsuen is part of the Kam Tin constituency, which is currently represented by Chris Li Chung-chi.

== Historic buildings ==
Shui Tau Tsuen and neighboring Shui Mei Tsuen are famous for their prow-shaped roofs decorated with dragons and carp.

Cheung Chun Yuen was a school providing martial arts training for village children aiming to gain success in the military stream of the Imperial Civil Service Examination. It was the only place that taught martial arts in the Kam Tin area in the past. The building also served as an ancestral hall. The traditional Chinese education system was imperial examination. Youngsters can attend the examination in order to become Juren. That was the honor to students that passed the imperial examination and serve the Emperor. Successful students can enjoy high social status and gain reputation for themselves. Thus, their family's social position and power can be enhanced. It had become a great concern to the clan that to gain official positions in the government.

The Chou Wong Yi Kung Study Hall was erected in 1685 by the Tang Clan, in honour of Chou Yu-te and Wang Lai-jen, two imperial officials whose pleading with the Emperor ended the coastal evacuation, and enabled the inhabitants to return to their homes in 1669.

Yi Tai Study Hall used to house two gods by a society organized by 16 renowned members of the local scholar-gentry. It has been used as a venue for educating youths of the villages. The forecourt of Yi Tai Study Hall was paved with white stones, so students who attended the study hall were also known as the "Students of White Stone Lane". White Stone Lane located outside the main entrance. Yi Tai Study Hall was built in a simple but functional style without great ornamental features. It was mainly decorated by leafy and geometric plaster moldings.

== Conservation ==
The Tang Kwong U Ancestral Hall and the Yi Tai Study Hall, are declared monuments.

Cheung Chun Yuen and Lik Wing Tong Study Hall are listed as Grade I historic buildings.

Chou Wong Yi Kung Study Hall and the Bin Mo Bridge are listed as Grade II historic buildings.

The Tang Yu Kai Study Hall, So Lau Yuen and the Hung Shing Temple are listed as Grade III historic buildings.
