= Shui Lau Tin =

Village in Hong Kong

Coordinates: 22.431017°N 114.08383°E

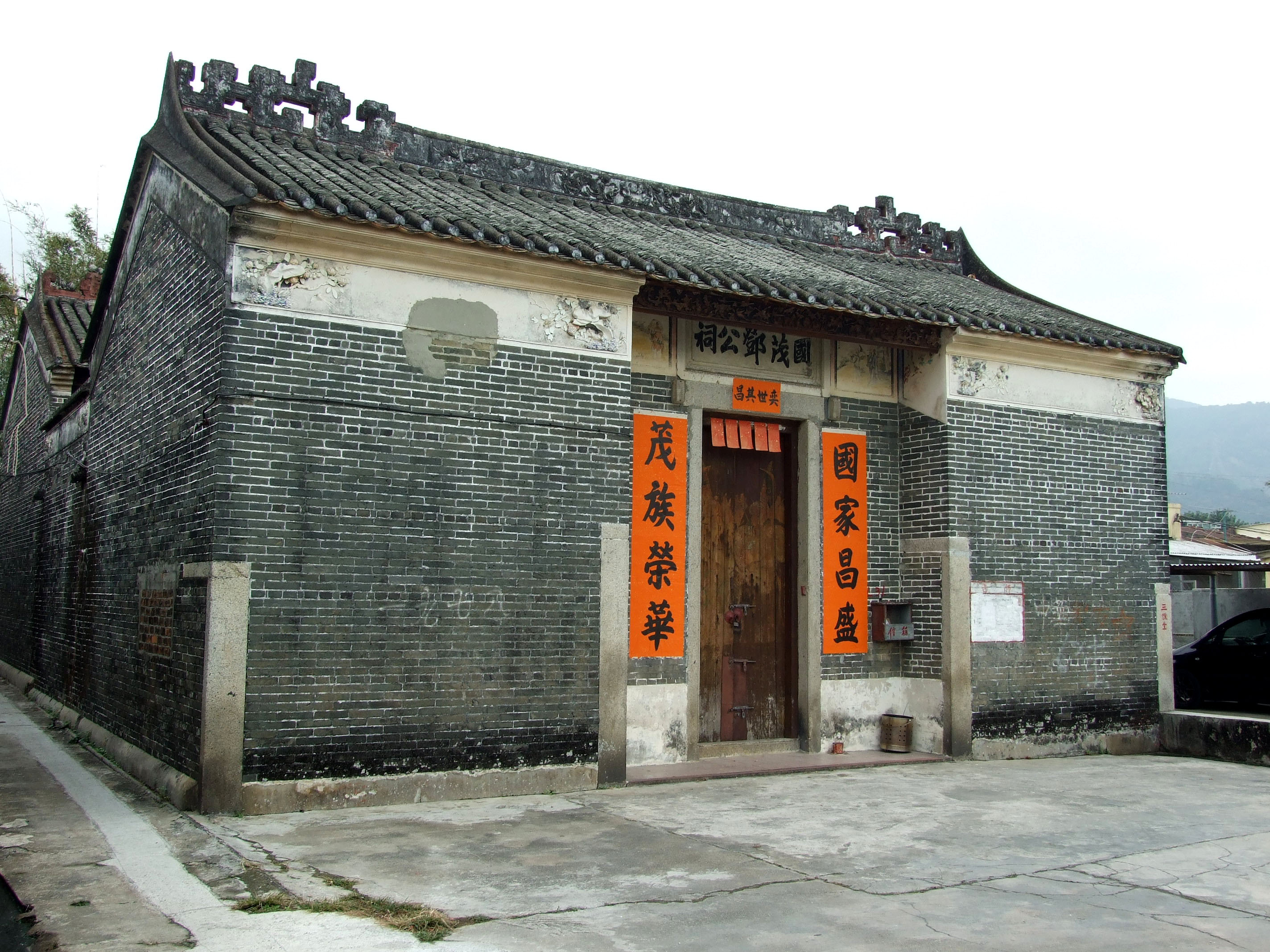
Tang Kwok Mou Ancestral Hall, No. 56 Shui Lau Tin in February 2011.

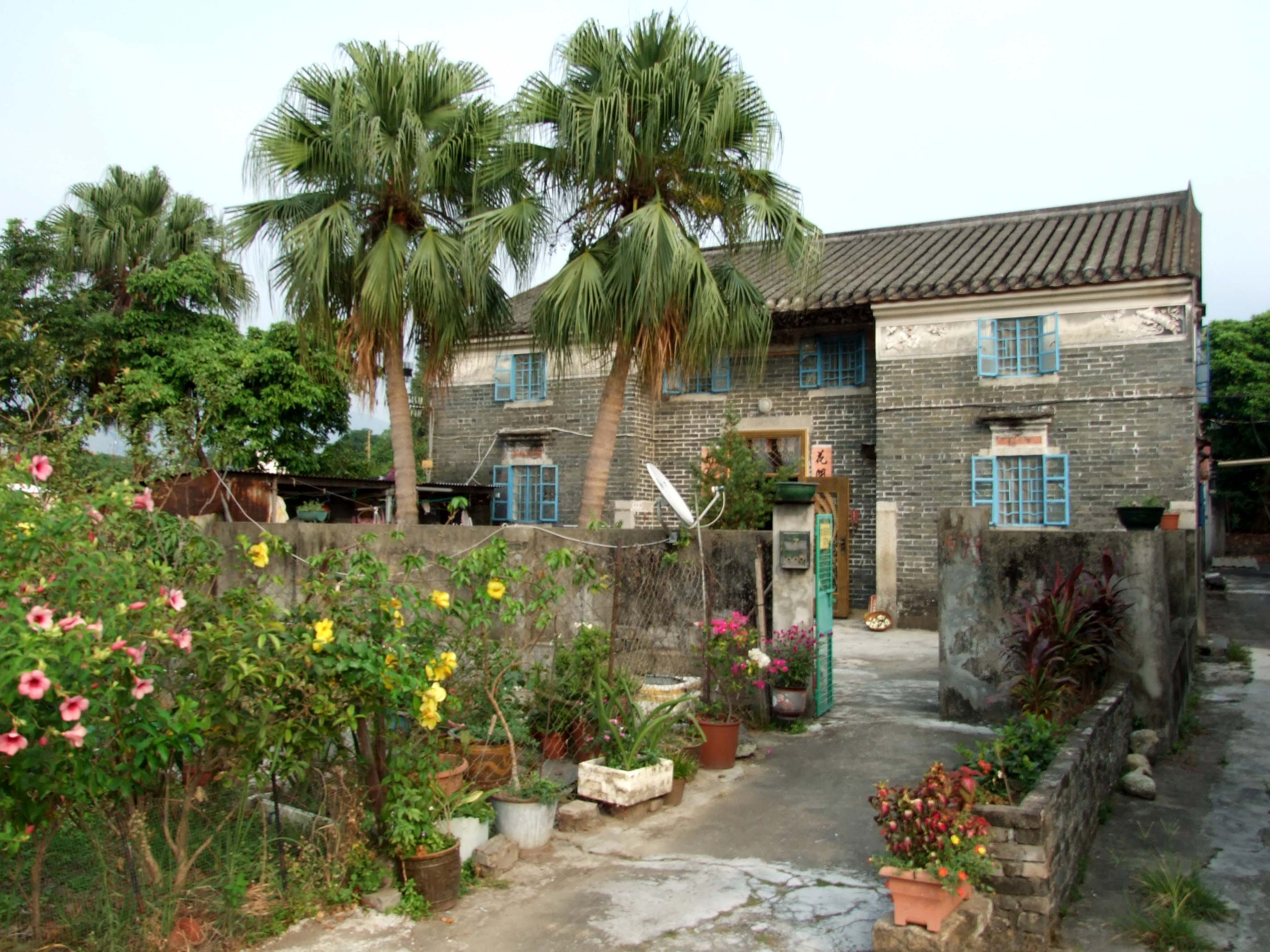
Old House, No. 57 Shui Lau Tin.

Shui Lau Tin (Chinese: 水流田) is a village in Pat Heung, Yuen Long District, Hong Kong.

== Administration ==
Shui Lau Tin is a recognized village under the New Territories Small House Policy.
