= Tsz Tong Tsuen (Kam Tin) =

Coordinates: 22.439406°N 114.064971°E

- Chinese: 祠堂村
Transcriptions
Standard Mandarin
- Hanyu Pinyin: Cítángcūn
- Bopomofo: ㄘˊ ㄊㄤˊ ㄘㄨㄣ
- Wade–Giles: Tz‘u^{2}-t‘ang^{2}-ts‘un^{1}
- IPA: [tsʰɨ̌.tʰǎŋ.tsʰwə́n]
Yue: Cantonese
- Yale Romanization: Chìhtòhngchyūn
- Jyutping: ci4 tong4 cyun1
- IPA: [tsʰi˩.tʰɔŋ˩.tsʰyn˥]

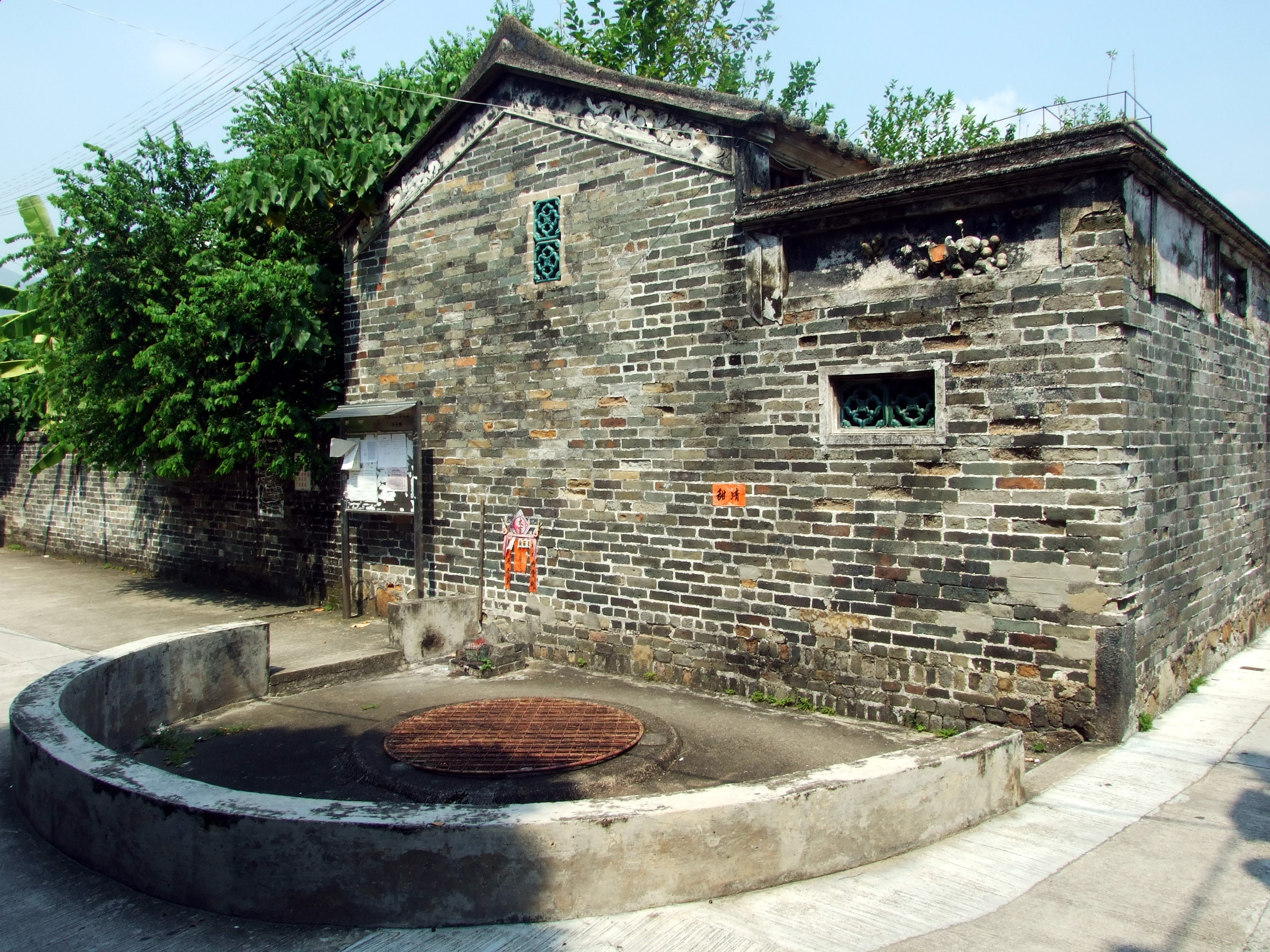
Residence of Tang Pak Kau in Tsz Tong Tsuen.

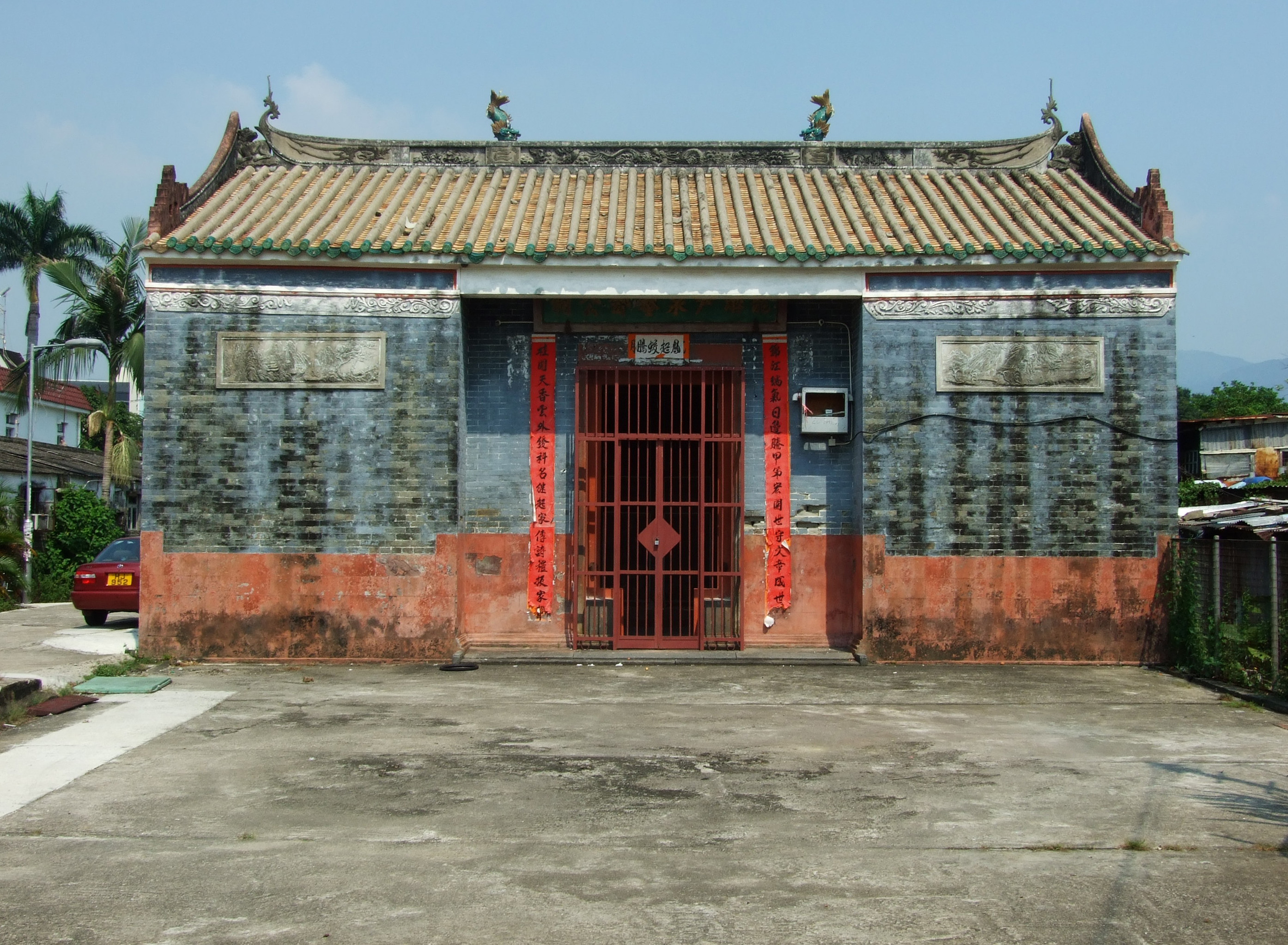
Tang Lung Yau Wan Tsuen Um Ancestral Hall in Tsz Tong Tsuen.

Tsz Tong Tsuen (Chinese: 祠堂村; Cantonese Yale: Chìhtòhngchyūn), also transcribed as Chi Tong Tsuen, is a village in the Kam Tin area of Yuen Long District, Hong Kong.

== Recognised status ==
Chi Tong Tsuen is a recognised village under the New Territories Small House Policy.
