= Fung Kat Heung =

Village in Hong Kong

Coordinates: 22.45632°N 114.0583°E

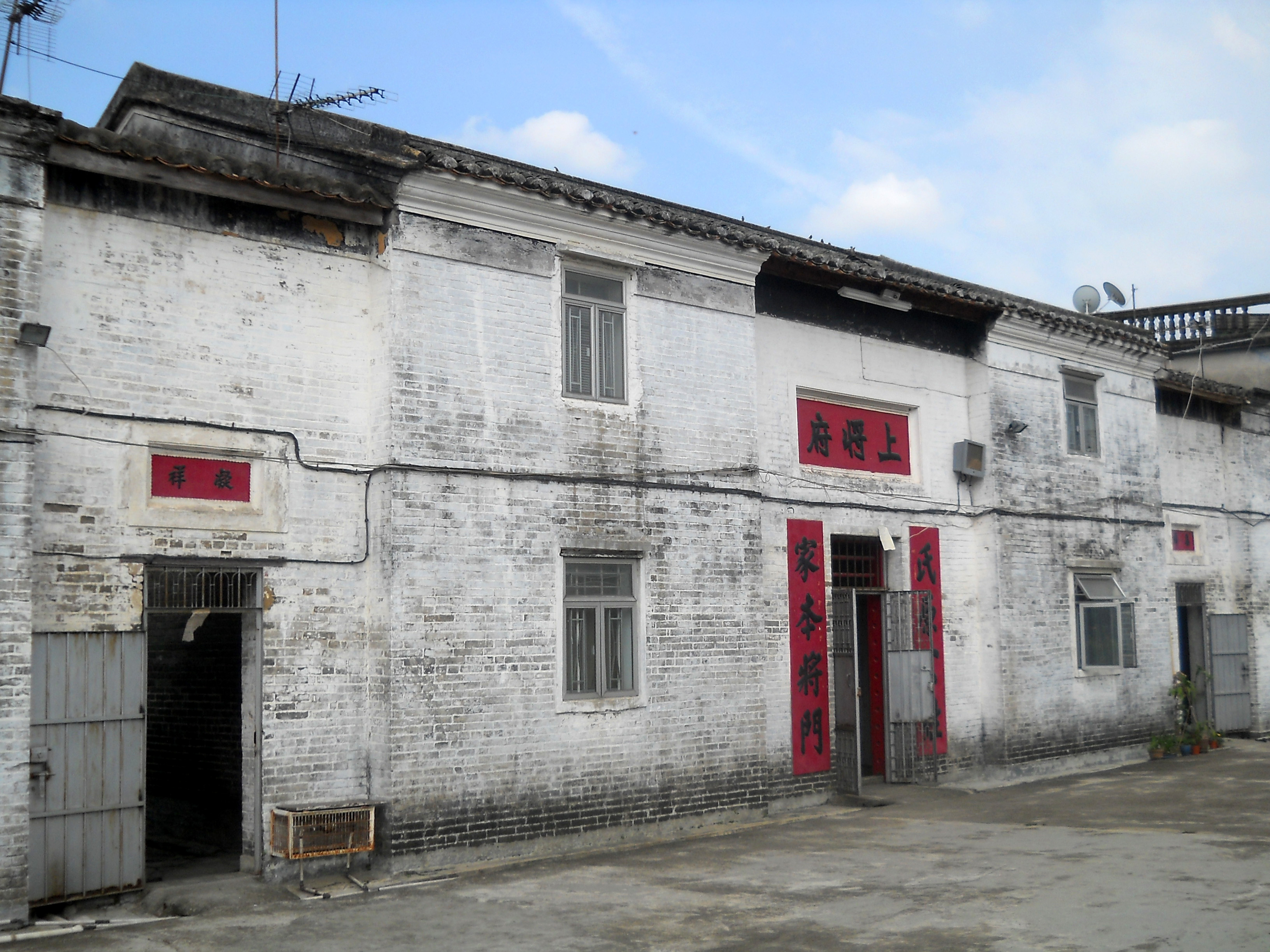
Main building of the General House in Fun Kat Heung

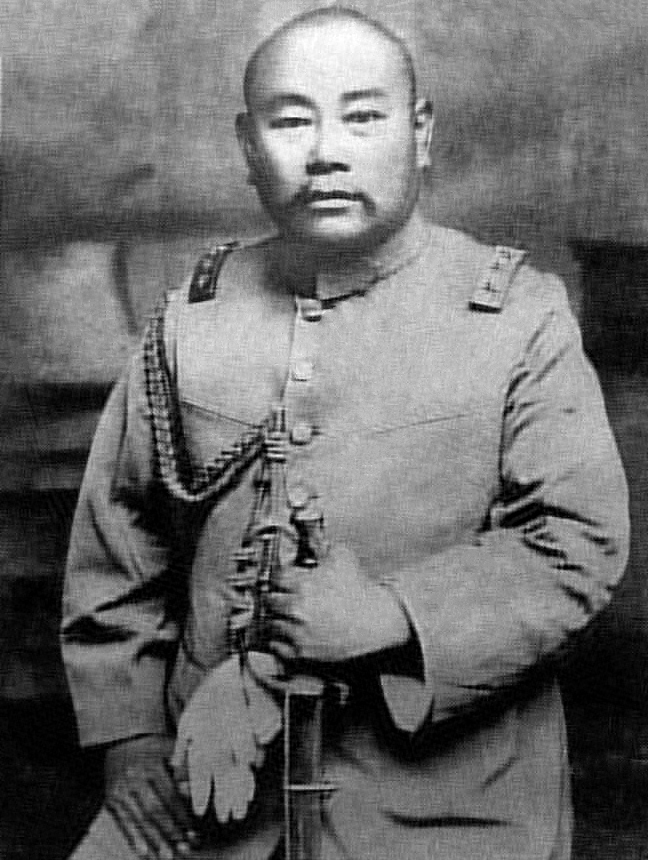
Shen Hongying (1871–1938)

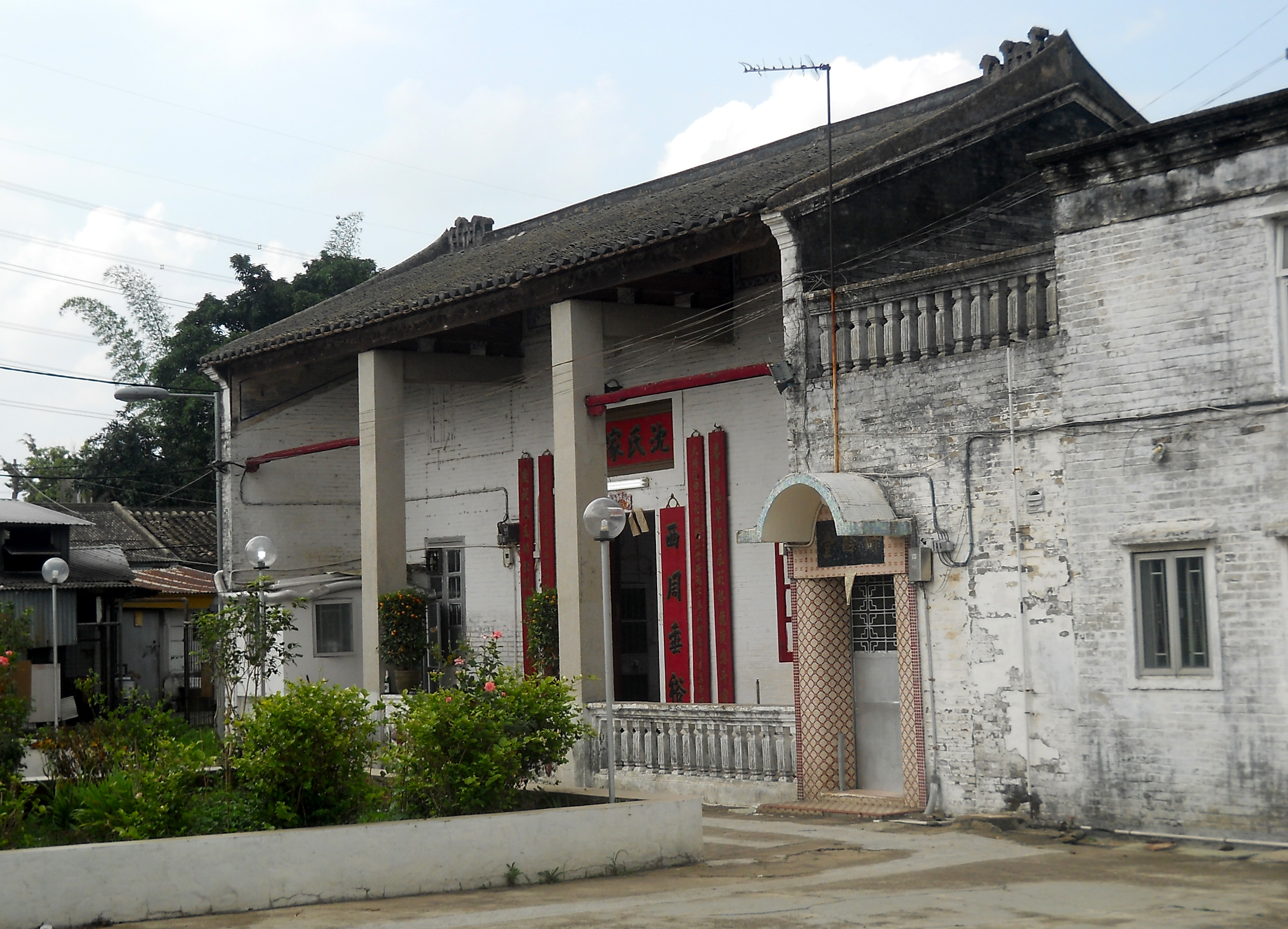
Shum Ancestral Hall of the General House, in Fung Kat Heung

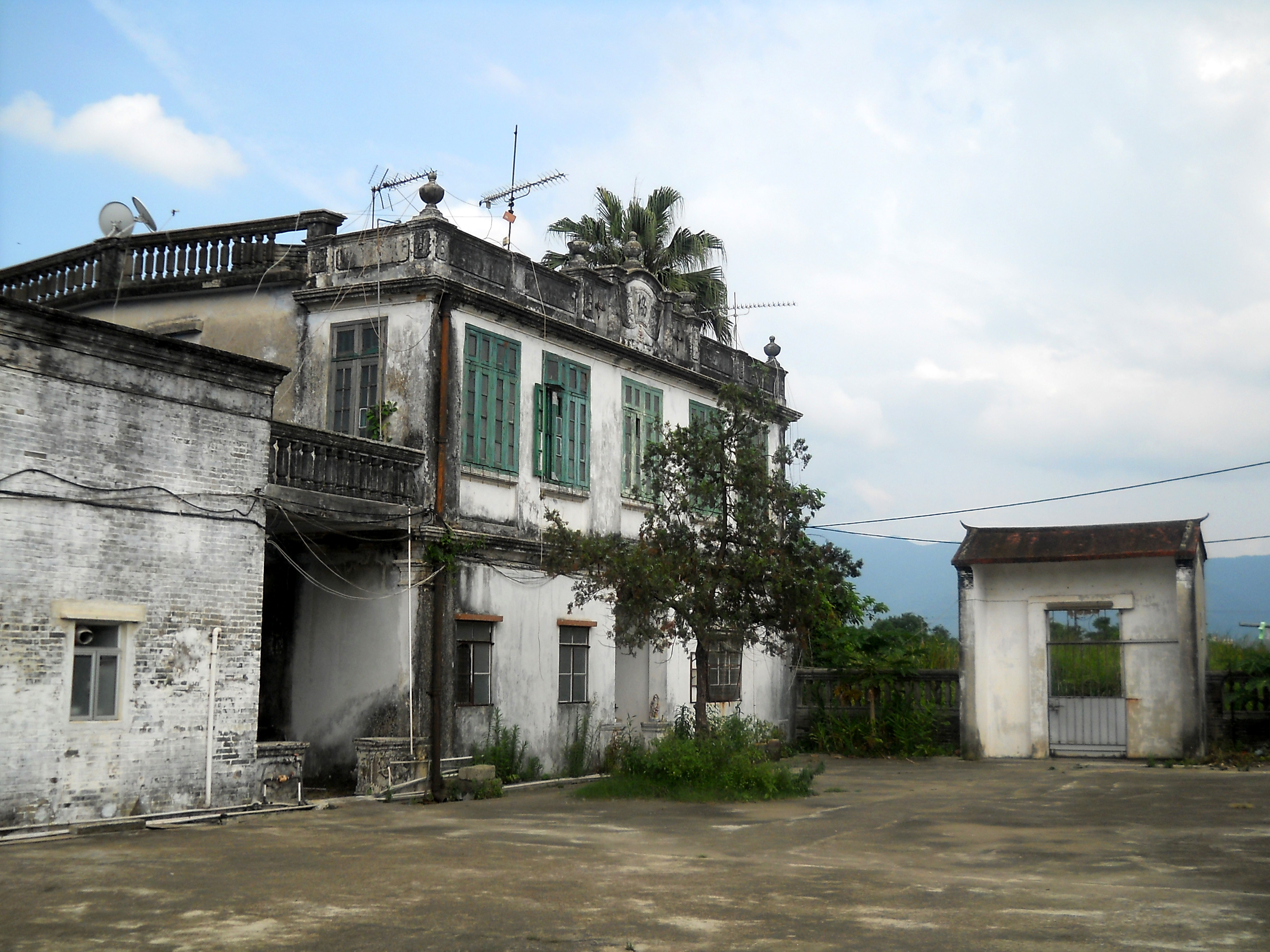
Hip Wai House of the General House in Fung Kat Heung

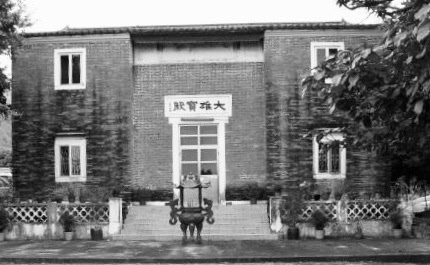
Nunnery at Miu Kok Yuen, Fung Kat Heung

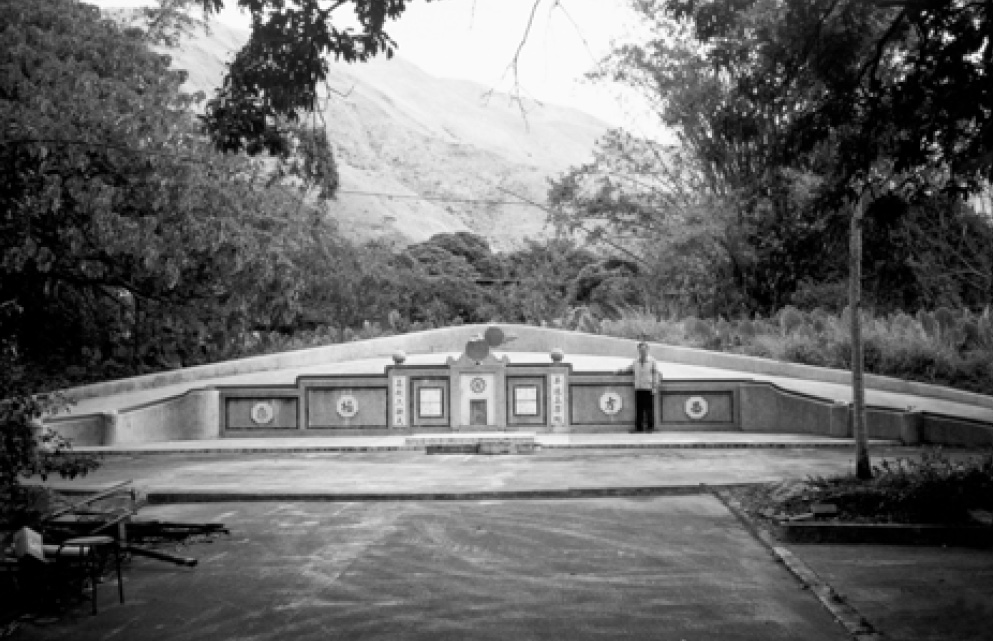
Martyrs Grave at Mui Kok Yuen

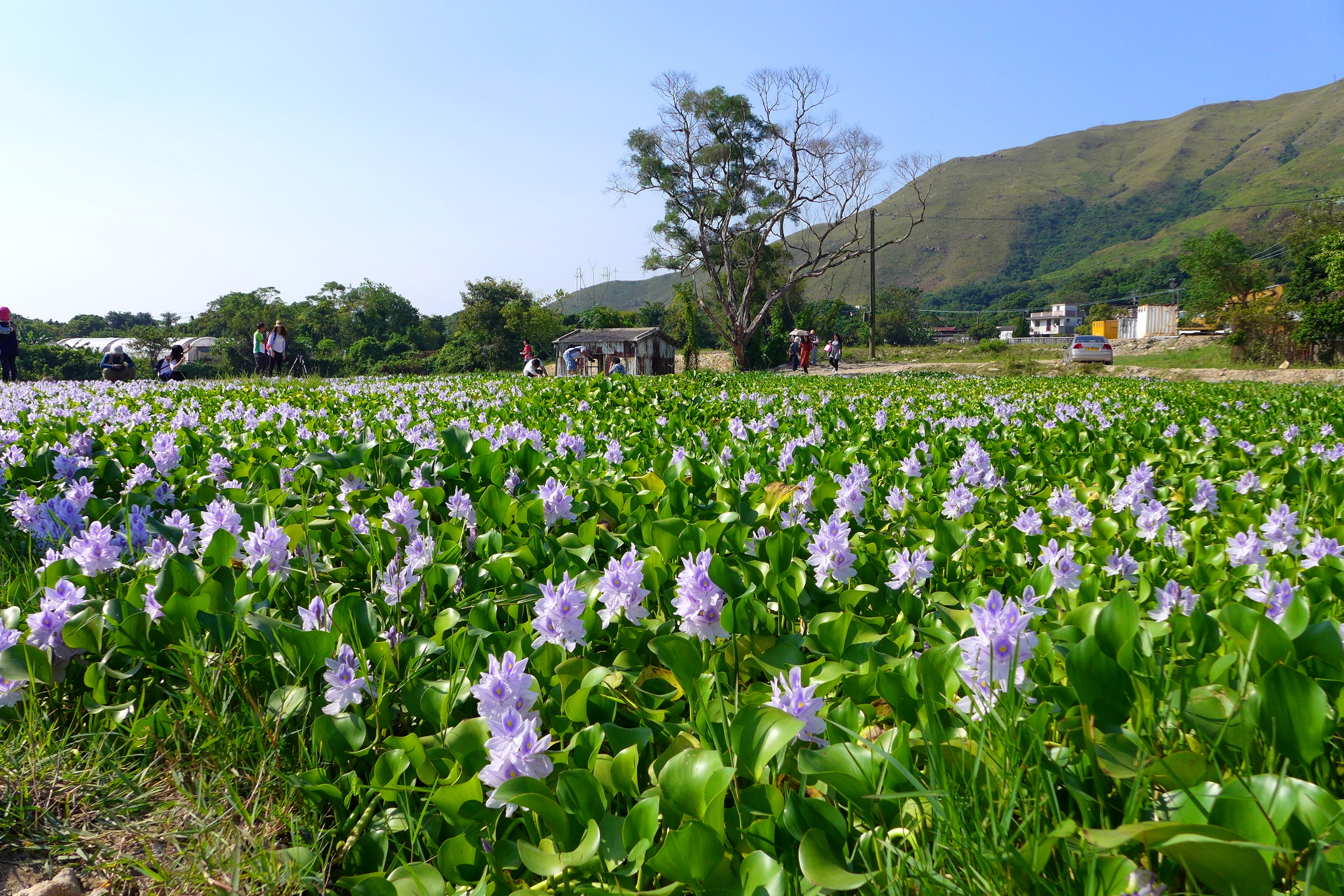
Field of water hyacinth at Fung Kat Heung

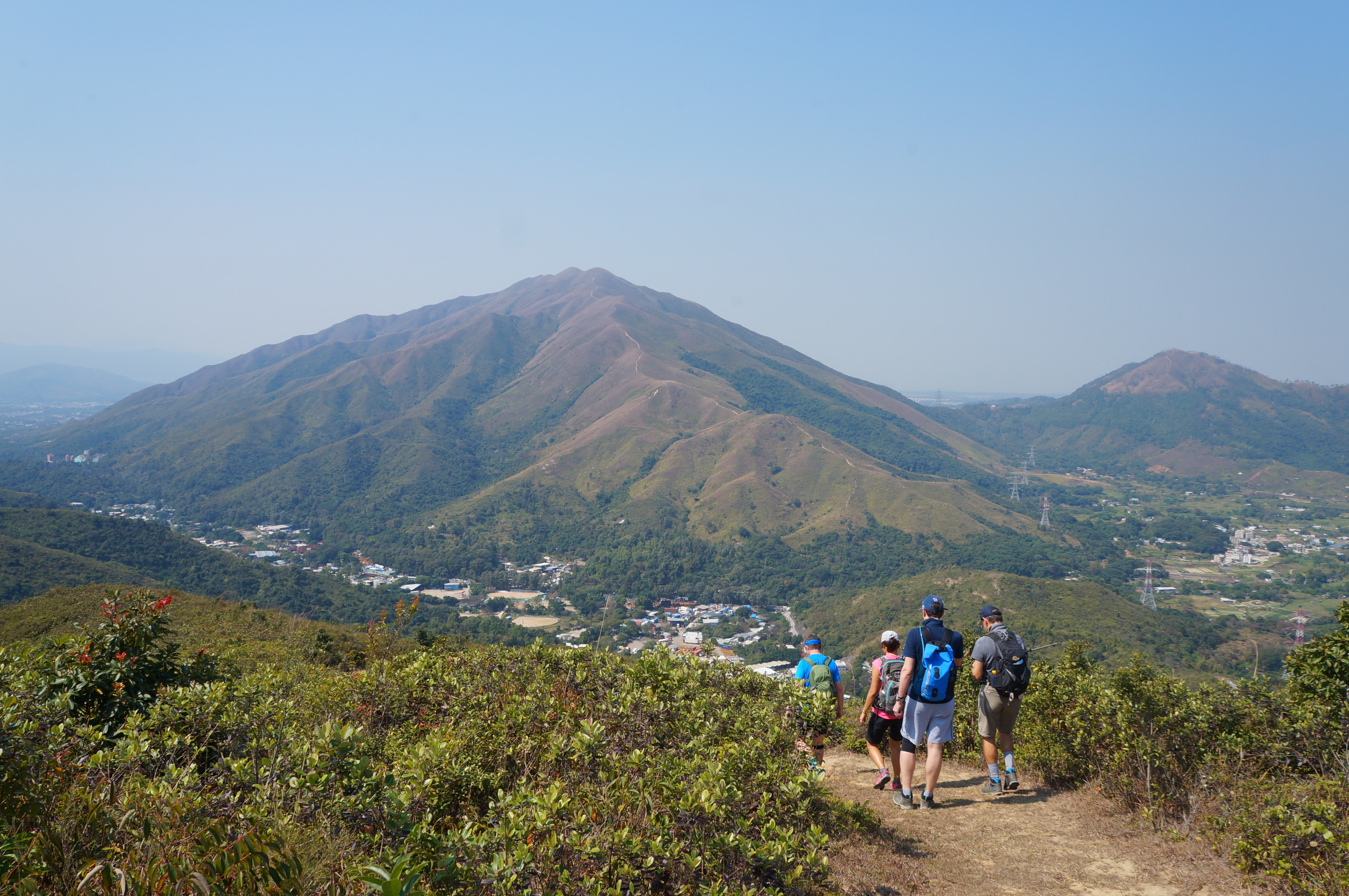
View from Kai Kung Leng; trailhead for Kai Kung Leng at Fung Kat Heung

Fung Kat Heung (Chinese: 逢吉鄉) is a village in the Kam Tin area of Yuen Long District, Hong Kong.

== Administration ==
Fung Kat Heung is a recognized village under the New Territories Small House Policy.

== Location ==
Fung Kat Heung is located near Au Tau on Old Castle Peak Road. It is east of the Kam Tin River and north of Sha Po Tsuen, at the foot of the Kai Kung Leng mountain range of Lam Tsuen Country Park.

== Connection with Shen Hongying ==
Fung Kat Heung is the ancestral village of the Shum (沈; Shěn) clan descendants of Shen Hongying (also transliterated as Shum Hung-ying) (1871–1938), who was a Chinese general in the Old Guangxi Clique during the Republic of China (1912–1949). Following his defeat in the Guangdong–Guangxi War, in 1926, Shen Hongying retired to this location and named the village Fung Kat (逢吉), to represent that all bad luck turns into good luck.

== Shum Residence or the "General House" ==
The building known as "General House" (上將府主樓) was built by Shen Hongying, a warlord of the Guangxi clique (桂系) during the warlord period (1912–1928) of the Chinese Republic. Shen Hongying was born in 1871 and moved to Luorong (雒容) of Guangxi from Enping of Guangdong. He had been a bandit and later became a prefecture officer (管帶) in the Qing government. He then served at the Republic government and was promoted to a number of posts, eventually became defence commissioner in the two provinces. He was the Commander-in-Chief of the Frontier Defence of the Third Route Army of Guangdong and Guangxi (粵桂邊防第三路軍總司令), had armed confrontations with the renowned generals Bai Chongxi and Li Zongren in 1925, and later fled to Hong Kong. When he was a general in China, he bought a lot of land in Hong Kong. He was a member of the Board of Director of Pok Oi Hospital in 1932 and 1933 and its chairman in 1934. His residence in Fung Kat Heung was completed approximately in 1932.

The residence is called Shum Residence (沈氏大屋) or Chun Nam Tong (鎮南堂) is a modern version of a Hakka house of high built heritage value. It is built in a row of three houses separated by two courtyards blending traditional Hakka architecture with western design elements. The largest component is the General House (上將府) in the middle and to its right is the Shum Ancestral Hall (沈氏家祠) and to its left the Hip Wai House (協威樓). The House's main building is a two-story structure having a rectangular hall surrounded by a U-shaped unit of living-rooms with a courtyard separating it. The upper story is accessed by a staircase in the hall and a bridge on the upper story is linking it to the rear unit. Verandas are on both storeys of the U-shaped unit. The building is constructed of green bricks having its walls supporting part of its pitched roofs of timber rafters, purlins and clay tiles. Part of its roofs are reinforced flat concrete ones. The building is with minimal decoration with the name board at its entrance above the lintel and simple fascia boards and black wall friezes.

The General House was used as the dining and living rooms where Shum met his friends and had meals with his friends and family. The four characters (宣威馳譽) by Chinese politician Li Yuanhong still hang in the living room of the general's house. Hip Wai House was where Shum lived. The Shum Ancestral Hall houses a number of soul tablets of Shum ancestors for worship with special offerings during the Chinese New Year, Qingming and Chung Yeung Festivals. Dim Dang (點燈) ritual is still held at the hall on the first day of the first lunar month. It is a rare example of early 1930s residential architecture.

== Additional places of historic interest ==
Also located in Fung Kat Heung is Miu Kok Yuen (妙覺園) and Ming Yuen (明園).

Miu Kok Yuen is a Buddhist nunnery and martyrs' grave built in 1936 by the Tang (鄧) clan of Kam Tin (錦田) in commemoration of the Punti and other indigenous inhabitants of the New Territories who protested British colonial rule and died fighting in the Six-Day War of 1899. This communal grave at Fung Kat Heung is the largest in the New Territories, measuring about 15 metres across and bearing the Chinese inscription 'Six days of outstanding bravery'. Elders from Kam Tin insist it contains at least 100 dead. The nuns pray three times a day for the souls of those who died. In 1996, the grave was restored.

Ming Yuen is a traditional village house. It is a one-story courtyard house.

== Education ==
Fung Kat Heung is in Primary One Admission (POA) School Net 74. Within the school net are multiple aided schools (operated independently but funded with government money) and one government school: Yuen Long Government Primary School (元朗官立小學).
