= Mother's Choice (Hong Kong) =

Charity in Hong Kong

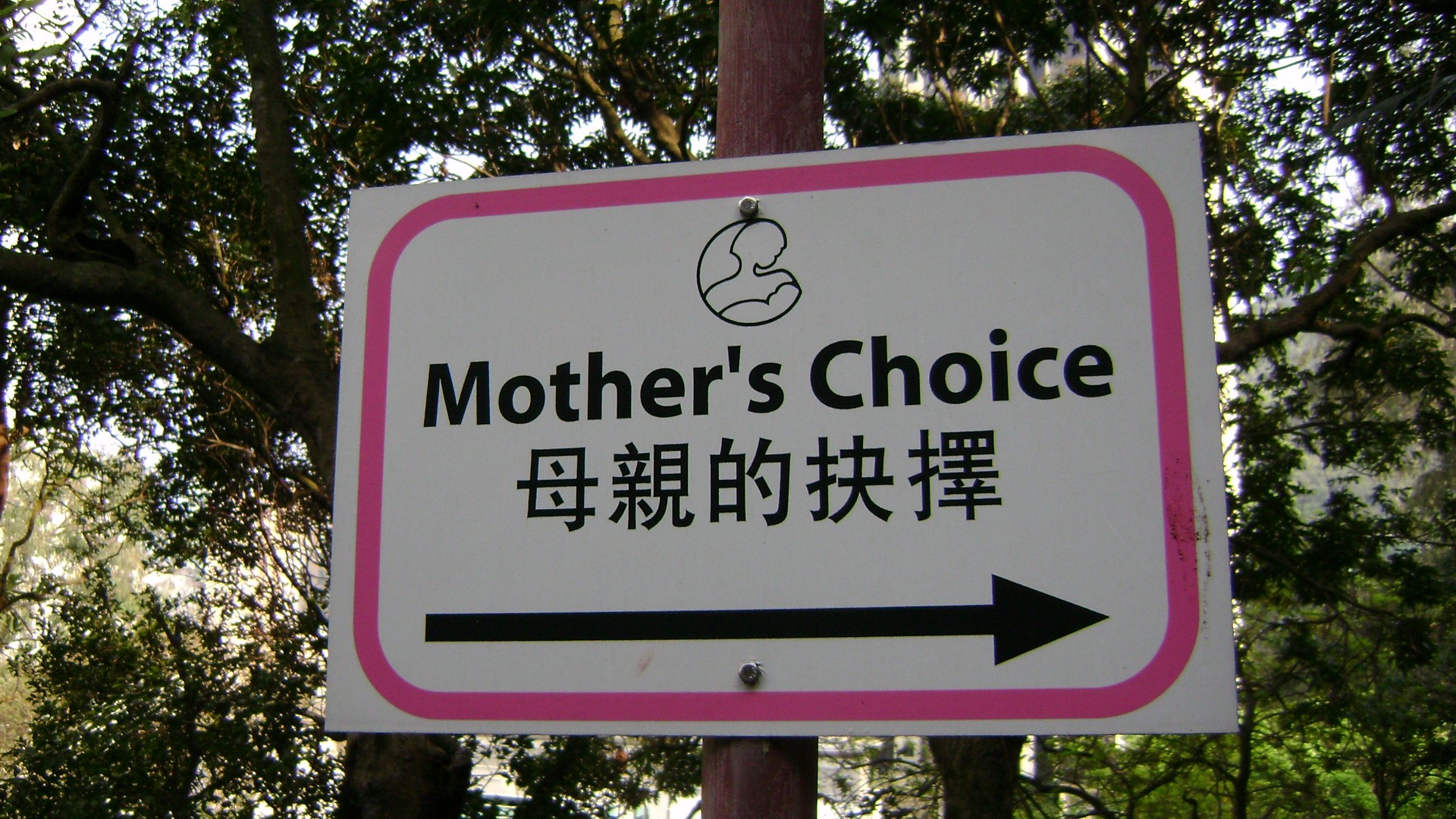
- Sign showing directions to Mother's Choice's Kennedy Road office
- Founded: 1987
- Founder: Ranjan Marwah; Phyllis Marwah; Helen Stephens; Gary Stephens
- Type: Non-governmental organization
- Headquarters: 42B Kennedy Road, Mid-Levels, Hong Kong
- Location: Hong Kong
- Key people: Sky Siu, CEO
- Website: www.motherschoice.org

Mother's Choice (Chinese: 母親的抉擇) is a local charity serving children without families and pregnant teenagers in Hong Kong. Mother's Choice was founded in 1987 by a small group of people wanting to help Hong Kong's single teenagers and their family members dealing with crisis pregnancy.

== Services ==
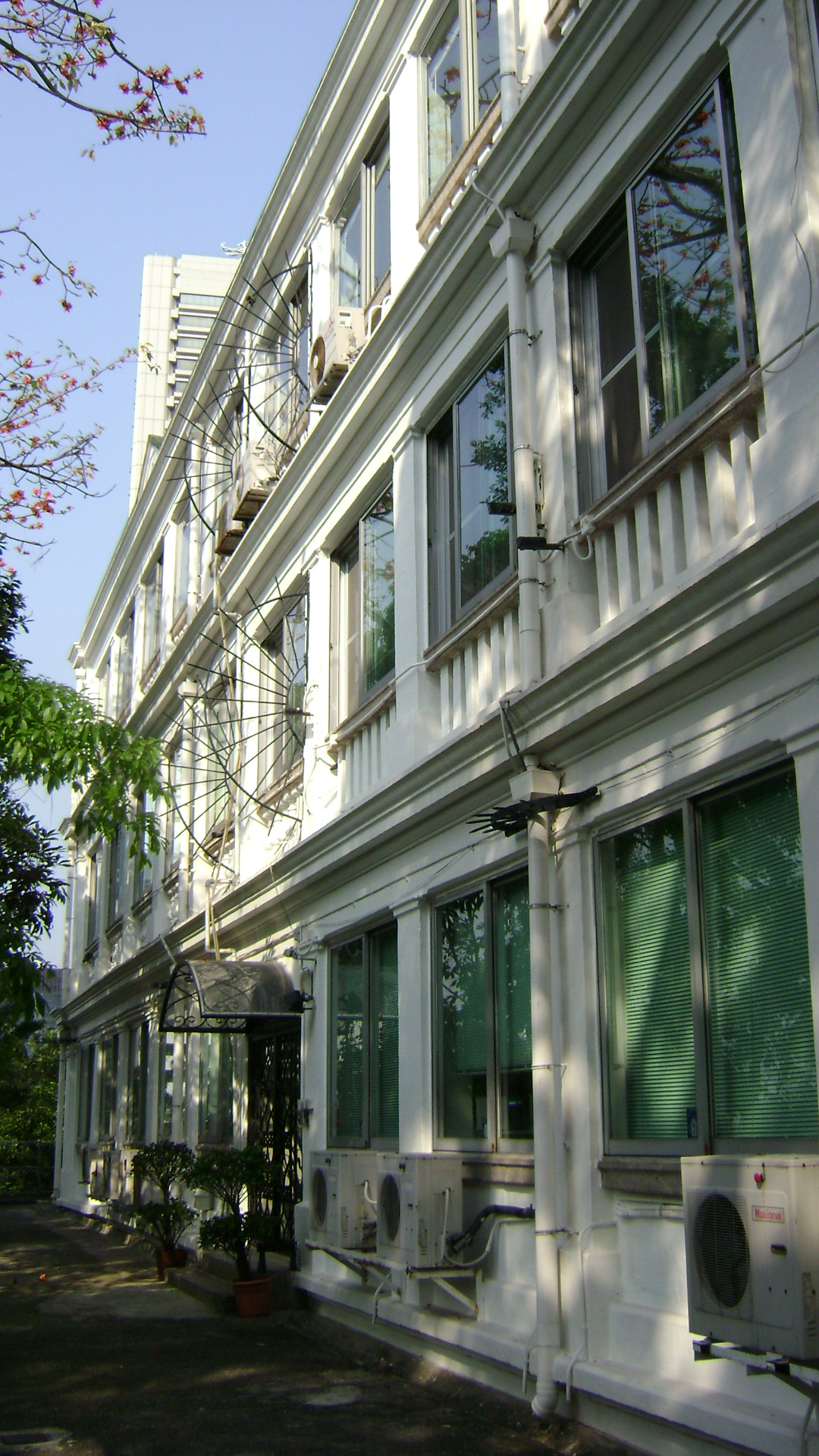
The central administration office at Kennedy Road also serves as a residential hostel for teenage girls during their pregnancy.

=== Pregnant Girls Services ===
Their services include a hotline, counselling, and a hostel for those who need a place to stay during pregnancy. Community education is also critical to their mission—they deliver sex education and related knowledge and information to young people, teachers, and parents in the form of school talks, workshops, and their bilingual website.

=== Child Care Home ===
In their Baby Care section, Mother's Choice cares for up to 32 babies at a time, ranging from newborns up to age two. In their Wee Care section, the charity cares for up to 12 children from newborns up to age 6 with a wide range of special needs.

=== Adoption Services ===
In collaboration with the Social Welfare Department of Hong Kong, Mother's Choice provides local and international adoption services and advocates for their babies and children to join their forever families as soon as possible.

=== Foster Care Services ===
Mother's Choice also provides temporary residential family care to children under 18 years of age whose parents cannot adequately care for them due to various reasons. The charity cares for 80 children through its Foster Care services.
