= Kam Tin (constituency) =

Hong Kong constituency

- Elected constituency for the Yuen Long District Council
- Boundary of Kam Tin in Yuen Long District
- District: Yuen Long
- Legislative Council constituency: New Territories North West
- Population: 20,792 (2019)
- Electorate: 7,040 (2019)

Current constituency
- Created: 1985
- Number of members: One
- Member: Vacant

Kam Tin (Chinese: 錦田) is one of the 39 constituencies in the Yuen Long District of Hong Kong.

The constituency returns one district councillor to the Yuen Long District Council, with an election every four years. Kam Tin constituency is loosely based on Kam Tin with estimated population of 20,792.

== Councillors represented ==
Election	Member	Party
1985	Tang Yat-kan	Nonpartisan
1991	Tang Pui-hon	Nonpartisan
1999	Tang Ho-nin	Nonpartisan
2003	Tang Tai-wah	Nonpartisan
2007	Tang Cheuk-yin	Nonpartisan
2019	Chris Li Chung-chi→Vacant	Nonpartisan

== Election results ==
=== 2010s ===
Yuen Long District Council Election, 2019: Pek Long
Party	Candidate	Votes	%	±%
Nonpartisan	Chris Li Chung-chi	2,569	52.84	
Nonpartisan	Tang Cheuk-yin	2,293	47.16	
Majority		276	5.68	
Turnout		4,894	69.57	
Nonpartisan gain from Nonpartisan		Swing		
