= Kam Tin =

Area in the New Territories, Hong Kong

Coordinates: 22.440°N 114.065°E

- Traditional Chinese: 錦田
- Simplified Chinese: 锦田
Transcriptions
Standard Mandarin
- Hanyu Pinyin: Jǐntián
Yue: Cantonese
- Yale Romanization: Gám tìhn
- Jyutping: Gam2 tin4

Kam Tin Heung
- Traditional Chinese: 錦田鄉
- Simplified Chinese: 锦田乡
Transcriptions
Standard Mandarin
- Hanyu Pinyin: Jǐntián Xiāng
Yue: Cantonese
- Yale Romanization: Gám tìhn hēung
- Jyutping: Gam2 tin4 hoeng1

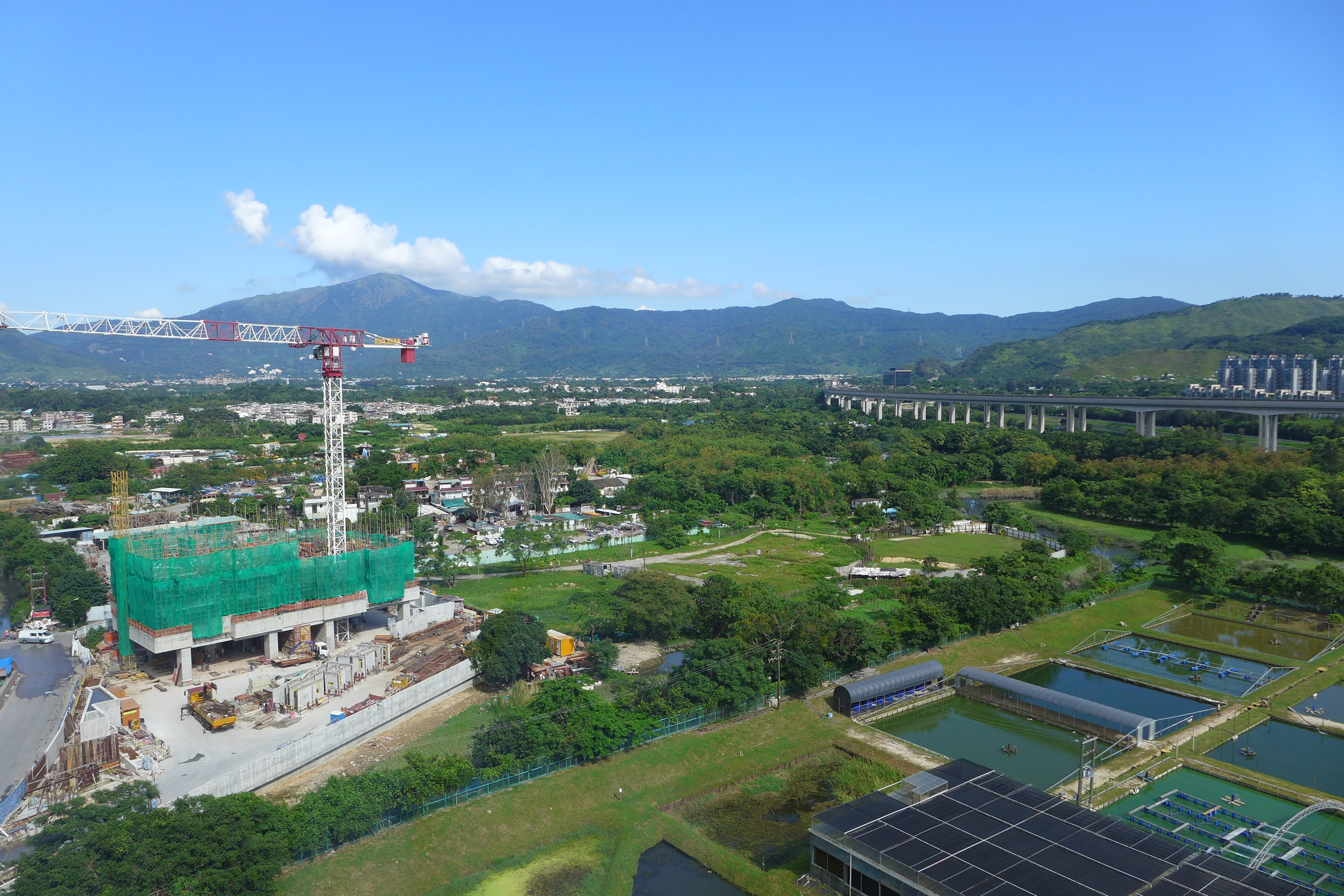
General view of Kam Tin.

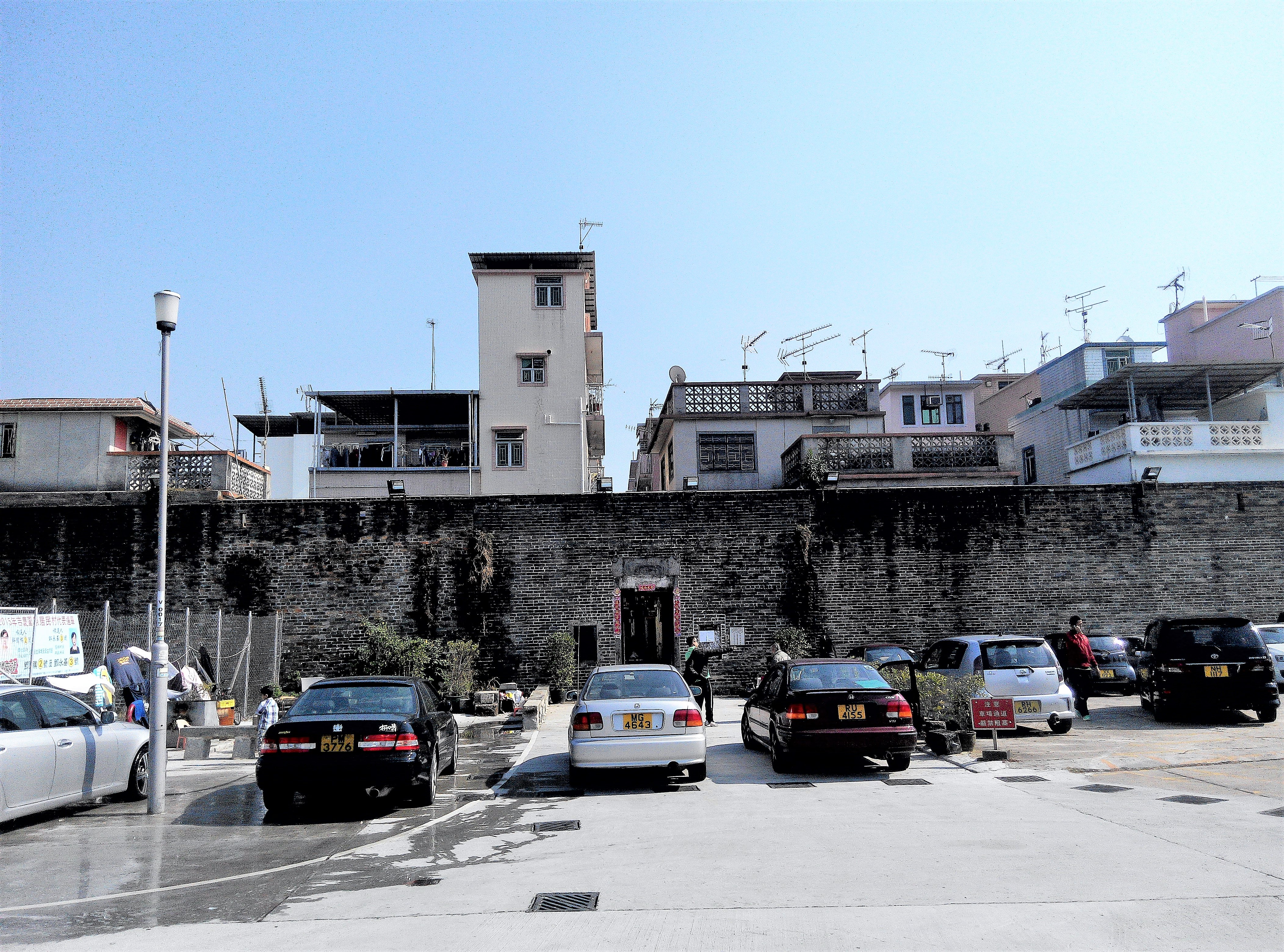
Kat Hing Wai, a walled village located in Kam Tin.

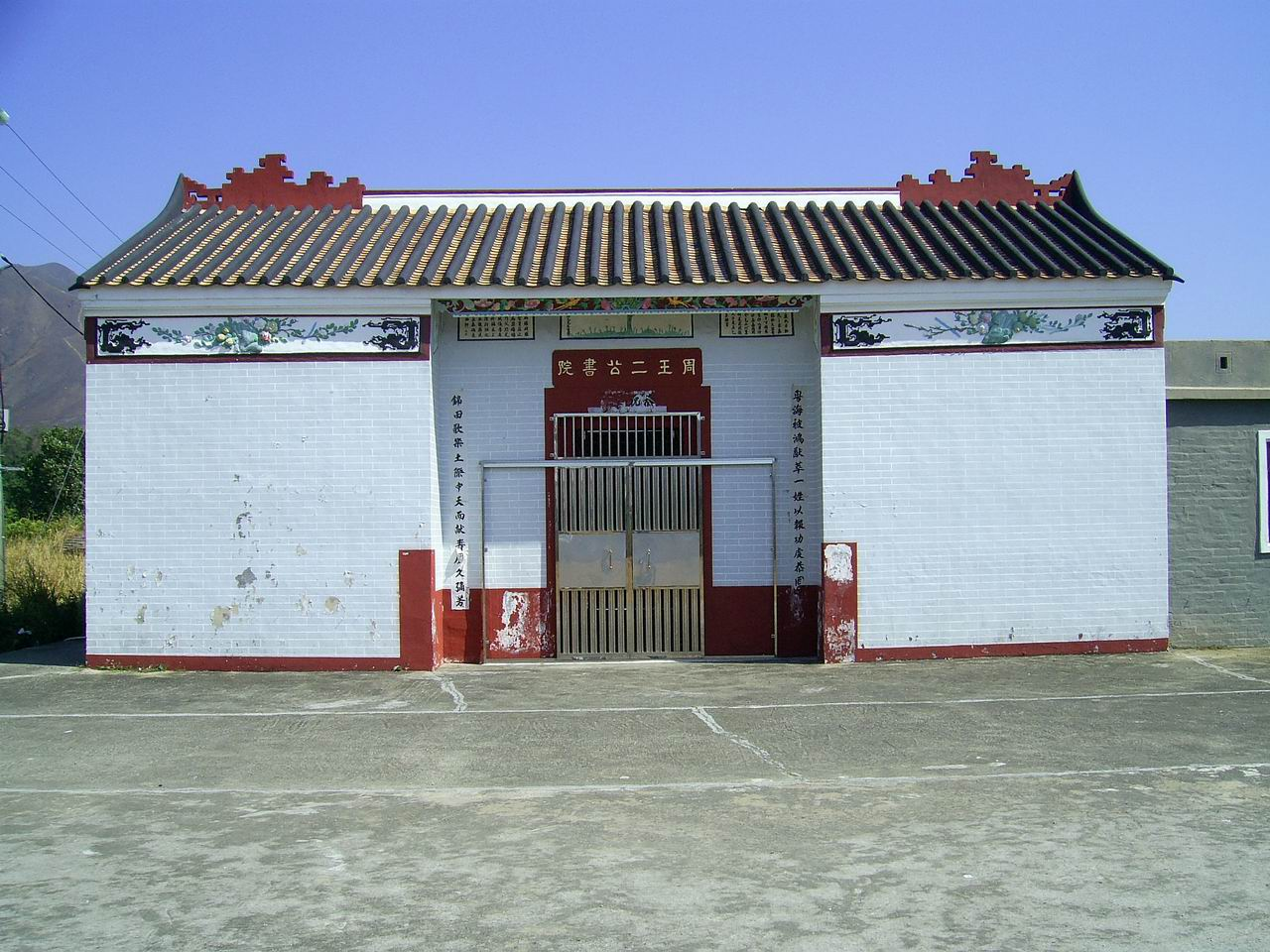
Chou Wong Yi Kung Study Hall in Shui Tau Tsuen, Kam Tin.

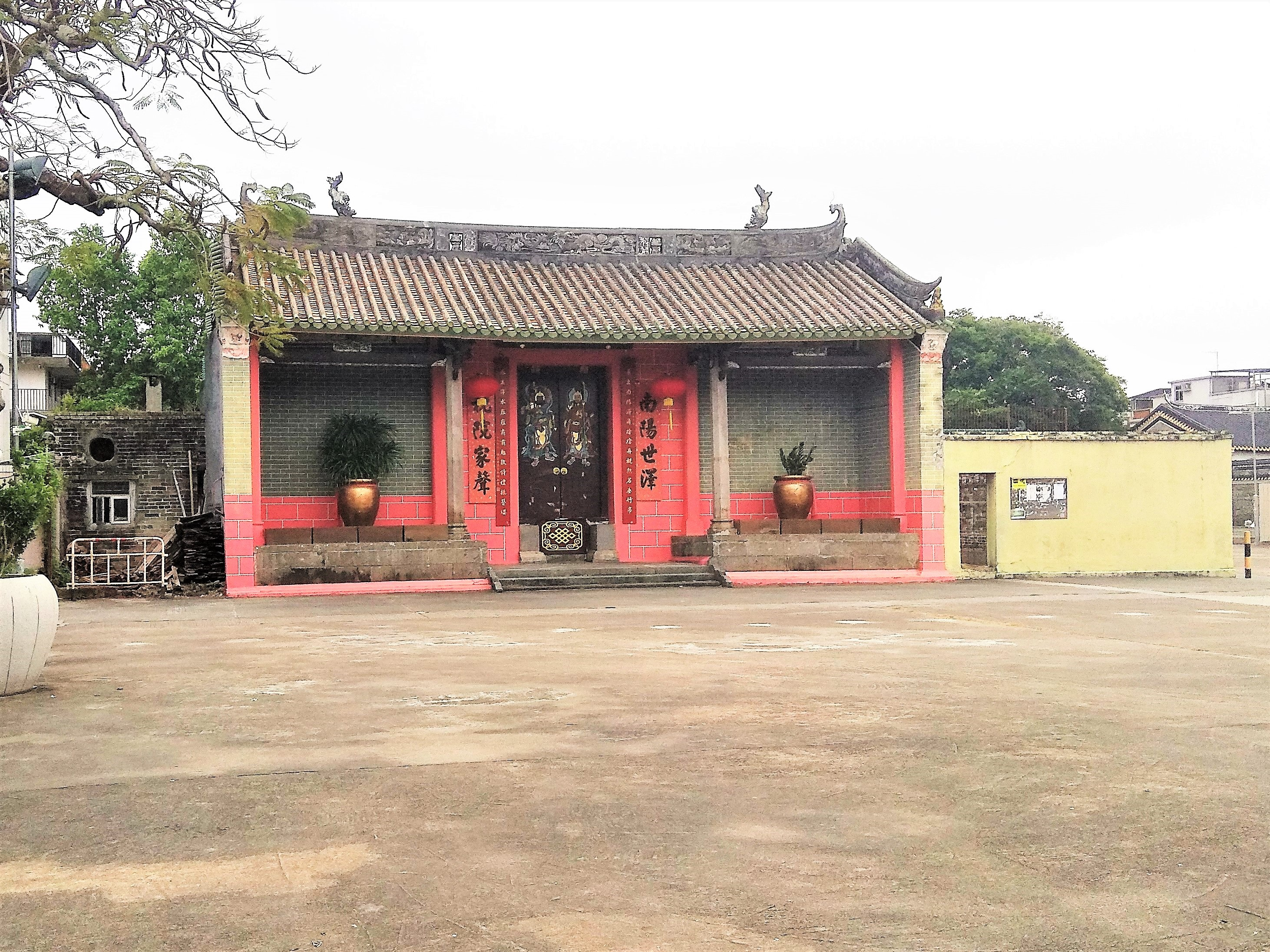
Tang Ching Lok ancestral hall in Shui Mei Tsuen, Kam Tin.

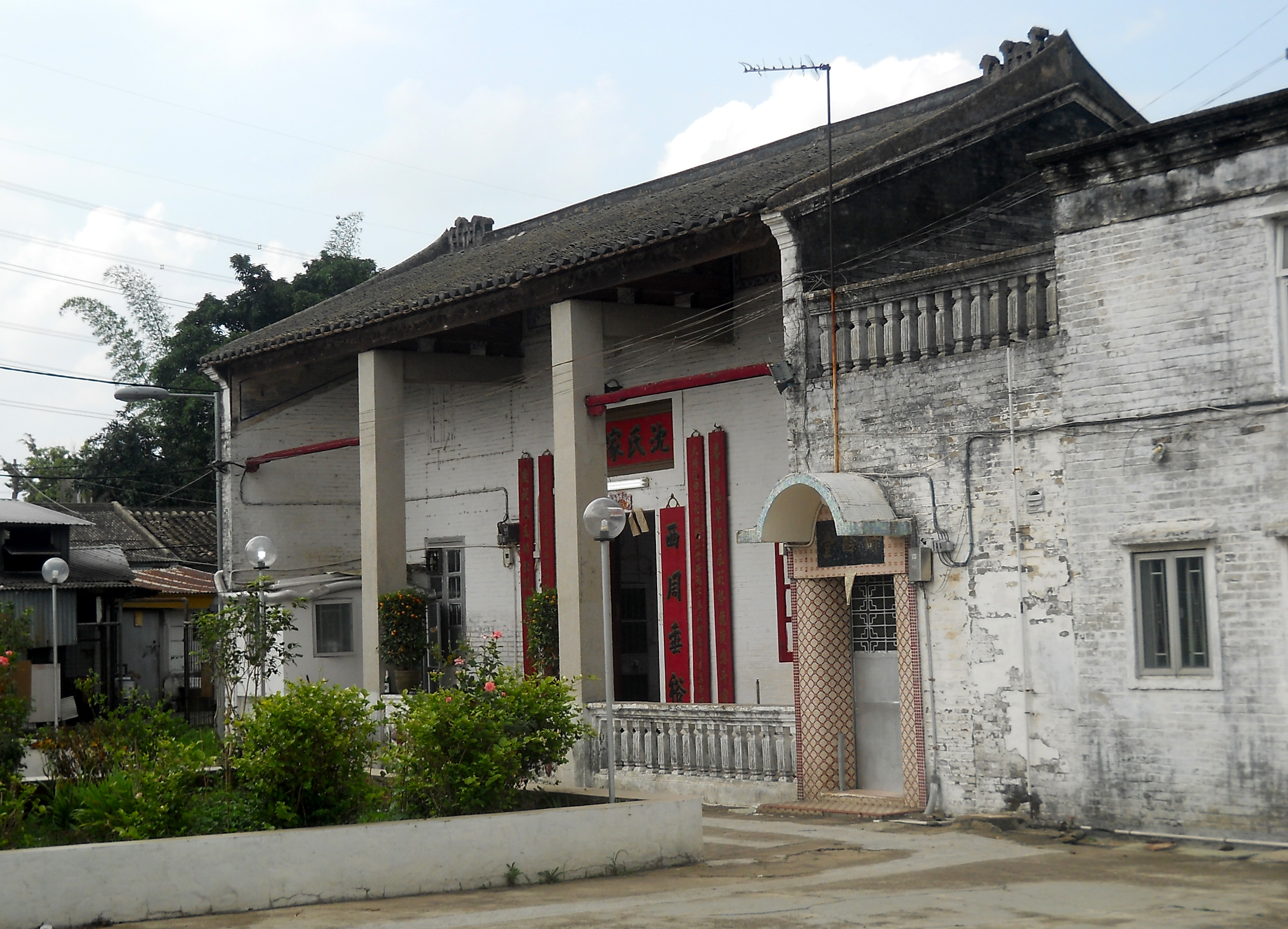
Shum Ancestral Hall of the General House, in Fung Kat Heung, Kam Tin.

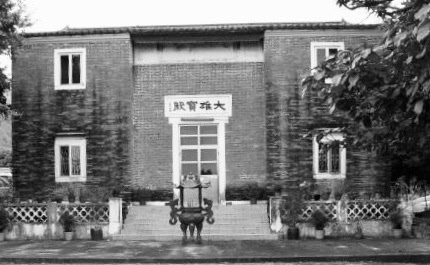
Nunnery at Miu Kok Yuen in Fung Kat Heung, Kam Tim

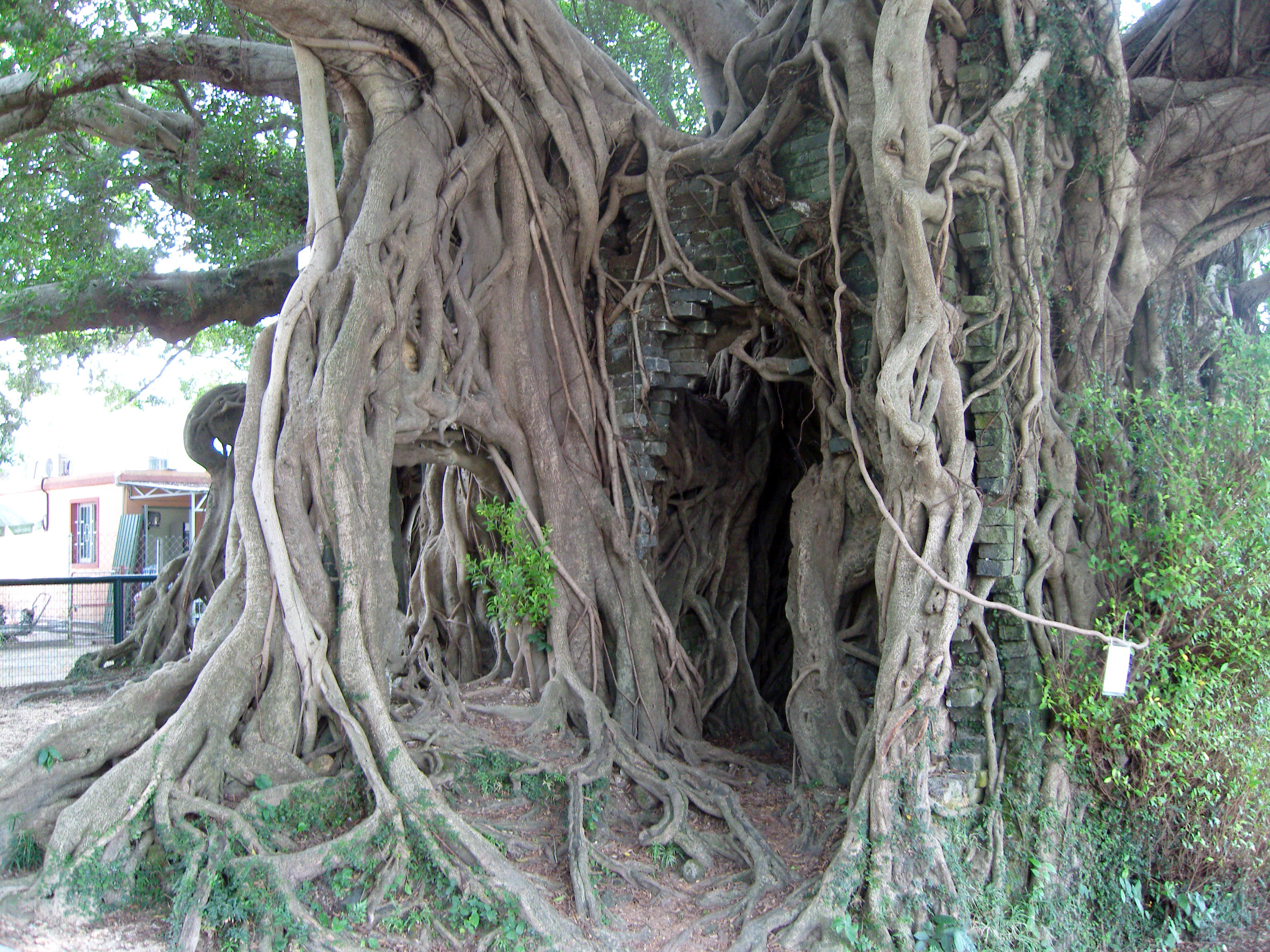
Kam Tin Tree House in Pak Wai Tsuen/Shui Mei Tsuen, Kam Tin.

Kam Tin, or Kam Tin Heung, is an area in the New Territories, Hong Kong. It lies on a flat alluvial plain north of Tai Mo Shan mountain and east of Yuen Long town. It was formerly known as Sham Tin (岑田). Administratively, it is part of Yuen Long District.

Many of Kam Tin's residents are from the Tang Clan, who are of the Punti culture, not Hakka as is often misattributed.

== History ==
Kam Tin is the origin of the biggest indigenous Tang Clan (鄧) in Hong Kong. The ancestor of indigenous Tang, Tang Hon Fat (鄧漢黻) settled his family from Jiangxi to Sham Tin in 973.

During the reign of Wanli Emperor (1572–1620) of Ming Dynasty, Sham Tin was renamed Kam Tin.

== Villages ==
Villages in Kam Tin include: Fung Kat Heung, Kam Hing Wai, Kam Tin Shing Mun San Tsuen, Kat Hing Wai, Ko Po Tsuen, Pak Wai Tsuen, Sha Po Tsuen, Shui Mei Tsuen, Shui Tau Tsuen, Tai Hong Wai, Tsz Tong Tsuen and Wing Lung Wai.

== Features ==
Kat Hing Wai is the most famous walled village located in Kam Tin. It is a compact village consisting mainly of narrow row-houses and temples separated by small alleys. The wall was erected to fend off pirates and bandits who were common in the area in the last millennium. It was the site of a rebellion against British rule in 1899.

There is also the Yi Tai study hall in Kam Tin. It was built by the Tangs for the local students to study for the Chinese civil servants qualifications. It also houses a temple to the god of study, Man Cheung.

In the village of Fung Kat Heung, Shen Hongying (沈鴻英), a Chinese general in the Old Guangxi Clique during the Republic of China, built his residence, a modern version of a Hakka house of high built heritage value. Known as "General House," the mansion has determined to be a Grade II historic building of special merit by the Antiquities Advisory Board (AAB) of Hong Kong. It is a rare residence to outline the development of the early 1930s. Minor additions and plastering are not that serious to downtune its authenticity.

Also located in Fung Kat Heung is Miu Kok Yuen (妙覺園), a Buddhist nunnery and communal martyrs' grave built in 1936 by the Tang (鄧) clan of Kam Tin (錦田) in commemoration of the Punti and other indigenous inhabitants of the New Territories who protested British colonial rule and died fighting in the Six-Day War of 1899. This communal grave at Fung Kat Heung is the largest in the New Territories, measuring about 15 metres across and bearing the Chinese inscription 'Six days of outstanding bravery'. Elders from Kam Tin insist it contains at least 100 dead. The nuns pray for the souls of those who died three times a day. In 1996, the grave was restored.

== Education ==
Kam Tin is in Primary One Admission (POA) School Net 74 (Yuen Long East). Within the school net are 11 aided schools (operated independently but funded with government money) and one government school: Yuen Long Government Primary School (元朗官立小學).

== Transport ==
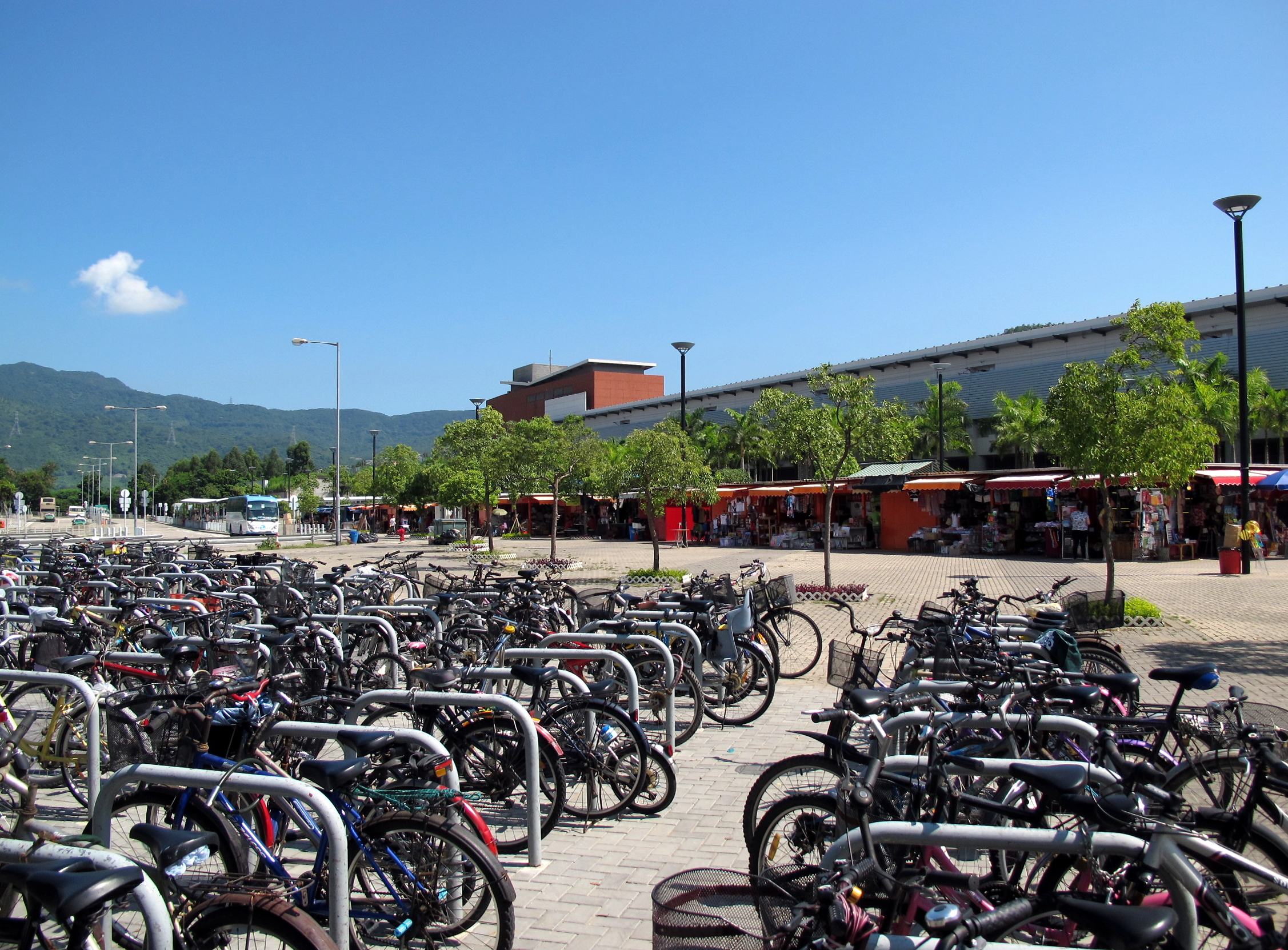
Kam Sheung Road station in Kam Tin.

Kam Tin is served by the Kam Sheung Road station of the MTR.

== See also ==
- Kam Tin (constituency)
- Kam Tin River
- Li Ying College
- Shek Kong
- Tai Lam Tunnel and Tai Lam Tunnel Bus Interchange
- Yuen Long Plain
