= Shui Mei Tsuen =

Village of Hong Kong

Coordinates: 22.447078°N 114.062045°E

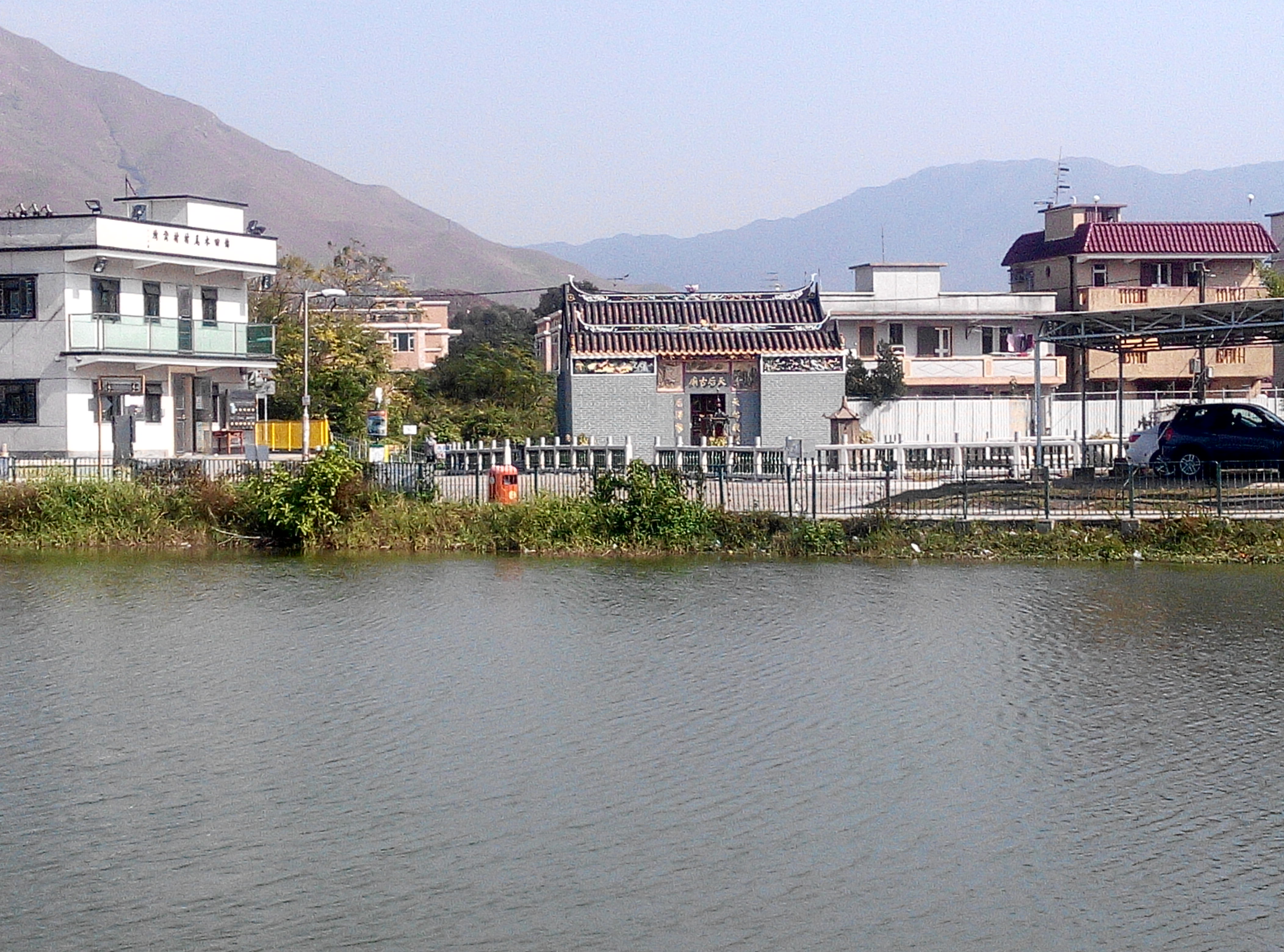
Tin Hau Temple and pond in Shui Mei Tsuen. Shui Mei Tsuen Village Office is on the left.

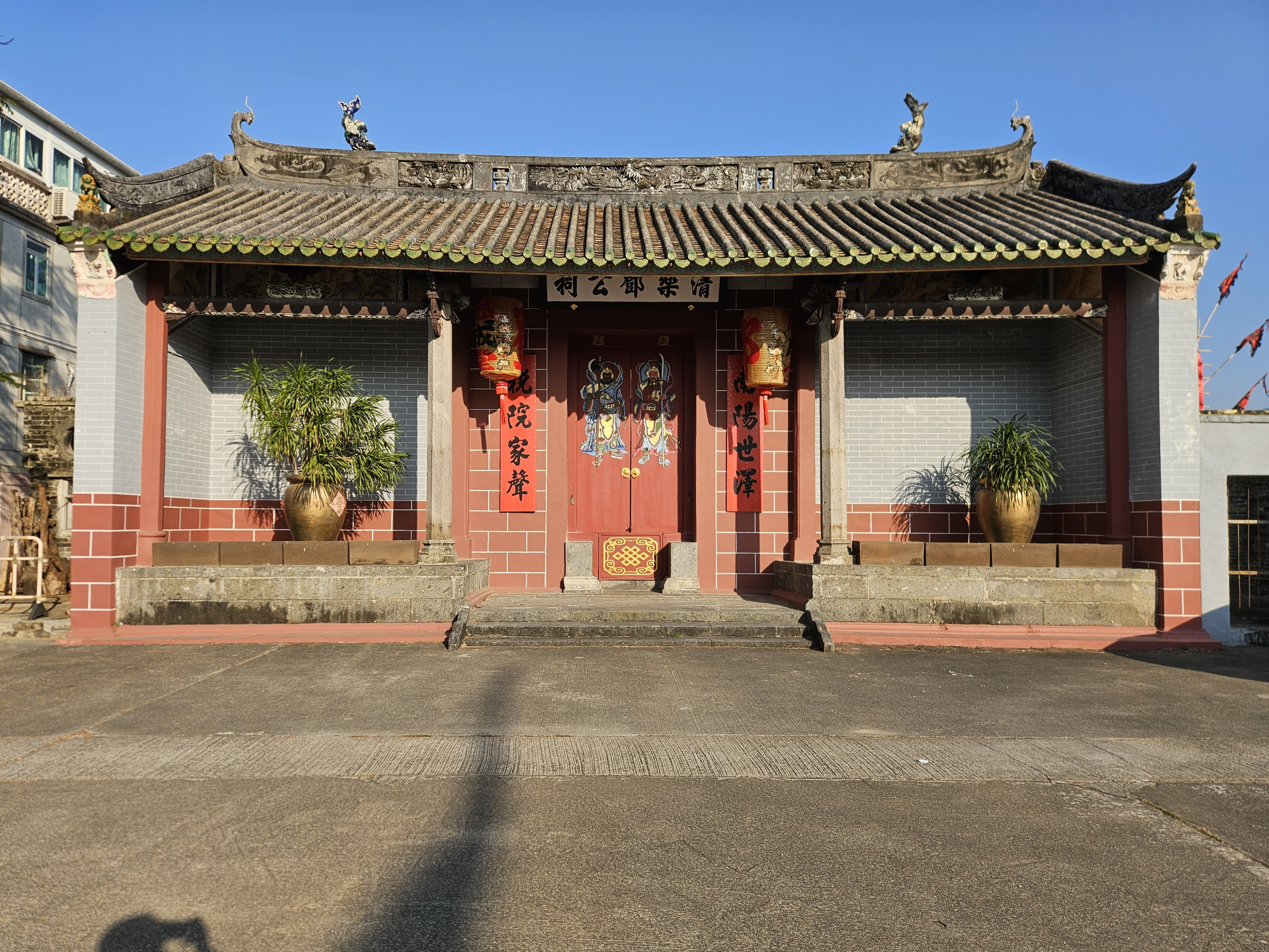
Tang Ching Lok Ancestral Hall (清樂鄧公祠) in Shui Mei Tsuen

Shui Mei Tsuen (Chinese: 水尾村) is a village in the Kam Tin area of Yuen Long District, Hong Kong.

== Administration ==
Shui Mei Tsuen is a recognized village under the New Territories Small House Policy.

== History ==
In January 2022, a pet dog was surrounded and beaten to death by four male inhabitants of the village; one was arrested. The dog's owner said that she begged the men for mercy, and that the assailants also threatened to beat her as well.
