= Citybus Route 12A =

Bus route in Hong Kong

12A
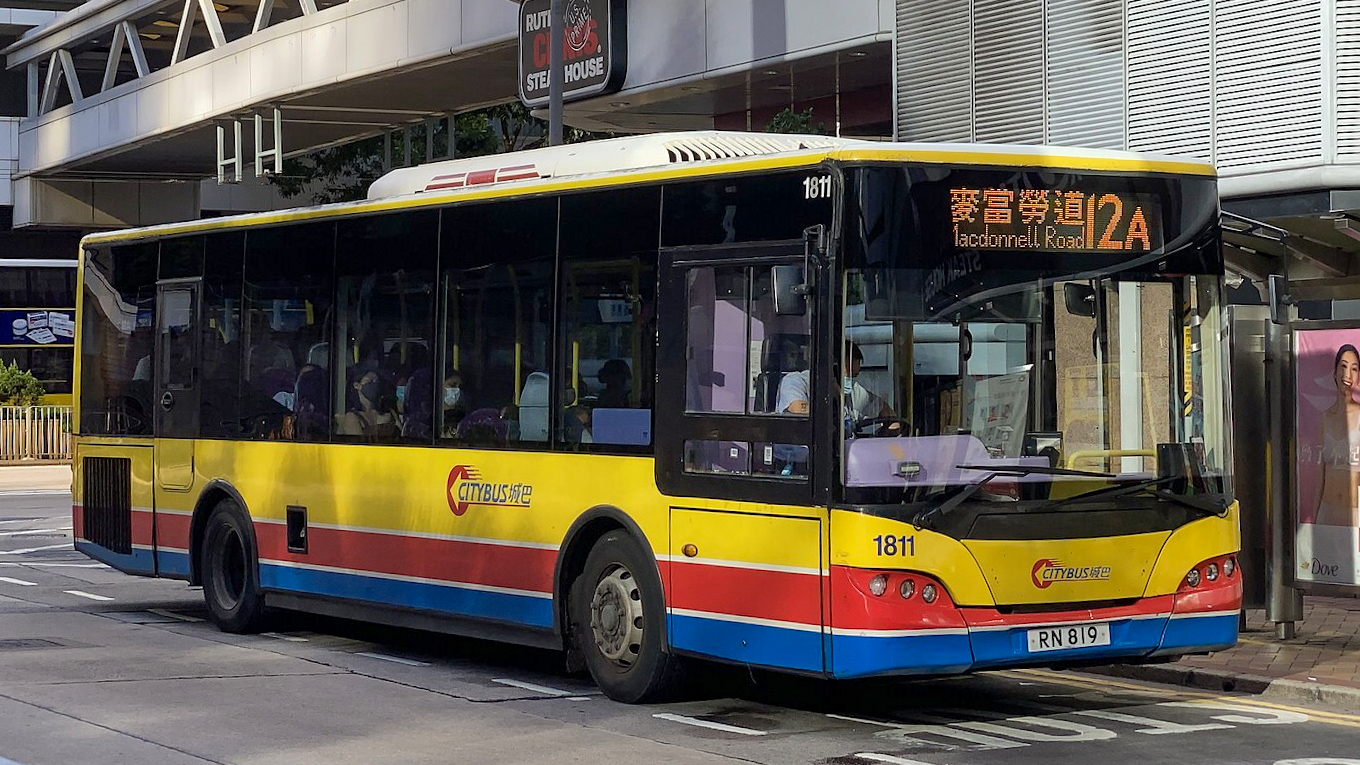
- A Youngman JNP6105GR at Admiralty (Tamar Street) terminus, 2022

Overview
- Operator: Citybus
- Vehicle: Youngman JNP6105GR; Youngman JNP6120GR
- Began service: 16 December 1961 (CMB); 11 September 1991 (Citybus)
- Ended service: 27 August 1987 (CMB)
- Former operator: China Motor Bus (CMB)

Route
- Termini: Admiralty (Tamar Street)
- Via: Cotton Tree Drive, MacDonnell Road, Kennedy Road, Garden Road, Central
- Length: 4.7 kilometres (2.9 mi)

Service
- Level: Daily
- Frequency: 3-25 minutes
- Journey time: ~23 minutes
- Operates: 06:50-00:00

Citybus route 12A is a bus route on Hong Kong Island. Operated by Citybus, it is a loop routing ating from Admiralty (Tamar Street), passing through Cotton Tree Drive, MacDonnell Road, Kennedy Road and Central before returning to Admiralty.

The route was first operated by China Motor Bus from its introduction in 1961 until it was suspended in 1987 due to declining ridership. Following its suspension, Citybus expressed its interest in reopening the route to the Hong Kong government. The government ultimately decided to open a tender to determine the route's operator despite the opposition of existing bus operators in the market, which was eventually won by Citybus. Route 12A restarted operations on 11 September 1991, and became Citybus' first franchised bus route.

== Route description ==
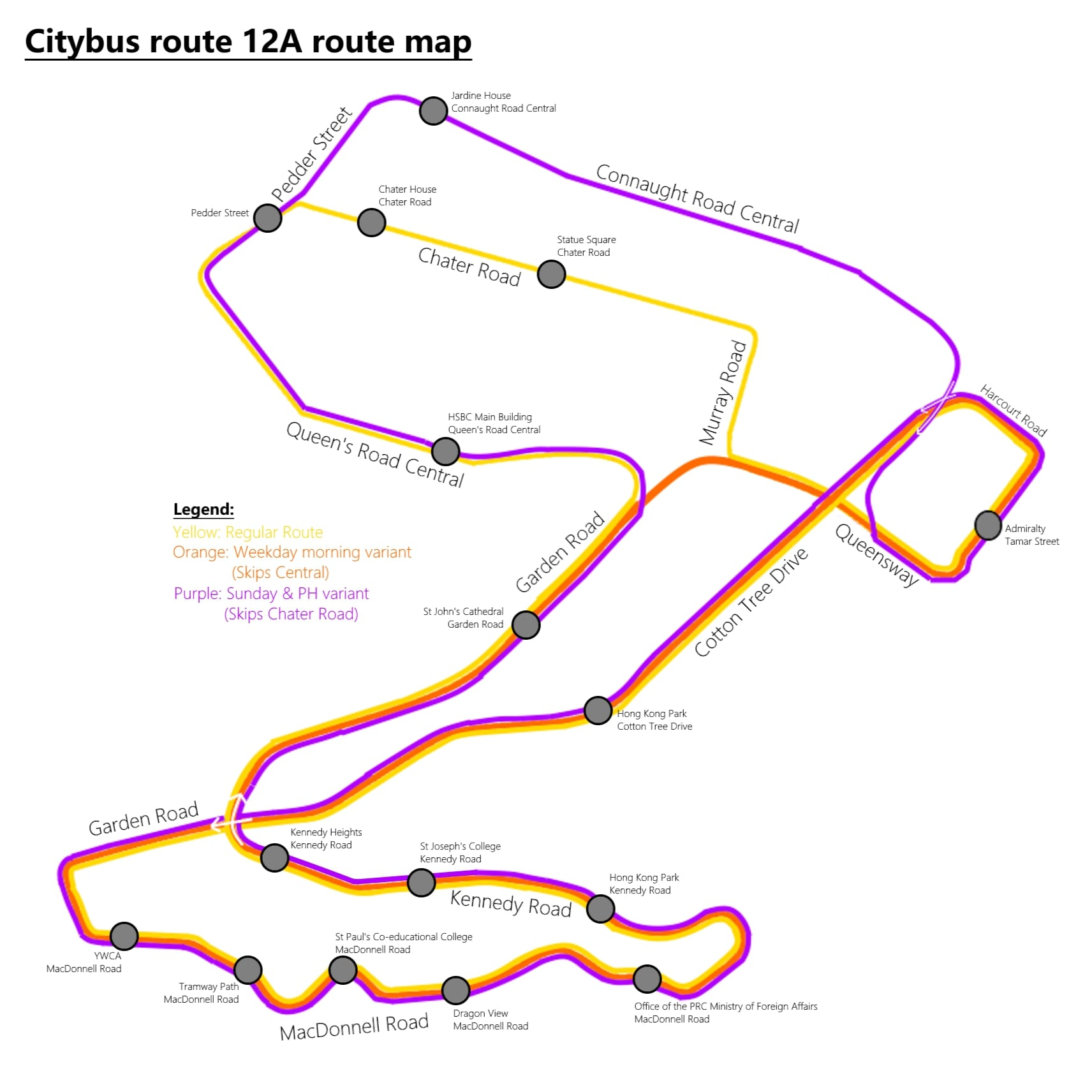
Map of route 12A showing all the route variants

Route 12A starts from Admiralty (Tamar Street) terminus along Tamar Street. From there, it turns left onto Harcourt Road and then makes another left onto Cotton Tree Drive. It continues southbound on Cotton Tree Drive and onto Garden Road before turning left to MacDonnell Road. It continues to the end of MacDonnell Road and turns left onto Kennedy Road. From Kennedy Road, it proceeds onto Garden Road, then turns left on Queen's Road Central into Central. It then makes three consecutive right turns into Pedder Street, Chater Road and Murray Road. From Murray Road, it turns left onto Queensway before turning left at Tamar Street to return to its terminus.

There are two route variants. One runs on weekday mornings and turns onto Queensway directly from Garden Road, skipping Central. Another runs on Sundays and public holidays, proceeding further down on Pedder Street and turning right onto Connaught Road Central, then turning right at Cotton Tree Drive before turning left onto Queensway to return to Tamar Street.

== History ==
=== First introduction and suspension ===
Route 12A was first introduced by China Motor Bus (CMB) on 16 December 1961, running as a full-day loop service between United Pier in Central and MacDonnell Road. The terminus at United Pier was shifted to a new large bus interchange nearby in 1972. In 1982, the service level was reduced, with the route only running on weekdays and the weekend service replaced by public light bus services.

The Central terminus was relocated twice in the 1980s, first on 1 February 1985 to Edinburgh Place, and then on 3 March 1986 to Central (Exchange Square) Bus Terminus. However, due to declining ridership as a result of mismanagement by CMB, the route was withdrawn on 26 August 1987.

=== Second introduction and Citybus takeover ===
After CMB stopped operating the route, residents along MacDonnell Road could only commute using public light buses, which were often unable to cope with the demand. At the same time, Citybus became interested in operating routes 12A and 17 (Central to So Kon Po via MacDonnell Road, also suspended by CMB since 1985), and in September 1989 expressed its interest in reintroducing route 12A to the Central and Western District Council. With the agreement of the council, Citybus formally submitted its application to operate the route to the government.

On 30 November 1989, due to a breakdown of negotiations over pensions between the labour union and the management of CMB, bus drivers employed by CMB went on strike, resulting in chaos for commuters on Hong Kong Island. The Southern District was one of the worst-hit areas, with no CMB buses running during the morning rush hour. On that day, Citybus provided a temporary non-franchised bus service in Ap Lei Chau, where public light buses were not allowed to enter, significantly increasing its reputation among residents in the area.

The next year, the government continued to process the application for the resumption of the route, and invited CMB to provide advice. They ultimately decided to put the new route up for tender to determine the operator of the route, thereby introducing competition within bus operators on Hong Kong Island. Despite the opposition of CMB and Kowloon Motor Bus (KMB) (the other franchised bus operator in Hong Kong at the time), the tender was called on 19 April 1991. Bidders included Citybus and several other non-franchised bus operators. CMB did not put forward a bid as they saw the route as unprofitable, while KMB briefly considered a bid but ultimately did not submit one. Citybus was ultimately announced as the winner of the tender.

The route restarted operations on 11 September 1991, reusing the route number 12A from the CMB era and running as a loop service from Hong Kong–Macau Ferry Terminal to MacDonnell Road via Admiralty. It became Citybus' first franchised bus route, breaking the monopoly CMB had on franchised bus services on Hong Kong Island and making Citybus the fourth franchised bus operator in Hong Kong (after KMB, CMB and New Lantao Bus). On the first day, nine double decker buses were used on the route.

On 15 February 1993, the starting point of route 12A was moved to Connaught Road Central. Fare discounts were simultaneously introduced for non-peak hours. It was moved again to its present terminus at Admiralty (Tamar Street) on 30 June 1994, with the return journey via Queen's Road, Pedder Street and Chater Road. In 1997, the route was rerouted to serve Garden Road cable car stop, with the fare discount scheme discontinued simultaneously. The rerouting was reversed in 2000, with a new special route 12S introduced between Garden Road and Admiralty replacing the deleted sector; route 12S would ultimately be withdrawn on 3 May 2004 due to "route restructuring".

From 1 June 2016 onwards, Citybus implemented a next bus arrival time inquiry system on eight bus routes, including route 12A. On 17 July 2017, an express variant of the route was introduced, running on weekday mornings and skipping Central on the return journey from MacDonnell Road to Admiralty.

== Fleet ==
When route 12A was operated by CMB, the fleet consisted mainly of non-air conditioned double decker Guy Arab V buses.

Following its reintroduction by Citybus, 11 brand new air conditioned Leyland Olympian double deckers were used on the route. This was followed by Volvo B6LE and Dennis Dart single deckers. In 1998, the route started using MAN NL262s, which had a higher capacity than the previous fleet. In 2015, newer Youngman JNP6105GR and JNP6120GR buses were introduced to replace the previous ageing fleet.

In September 2024, Citybus announced it was seeking approval from the relevant authorities for the reintroduction of double deckers on route 12A. On 10 April 2026, chairman of the Central and Western District Council Transportation Committee Jeremy Young joined a trial run of a double decker bus on route 12A, and announced that double deckers would be deployed on the route from 13 April onwards.

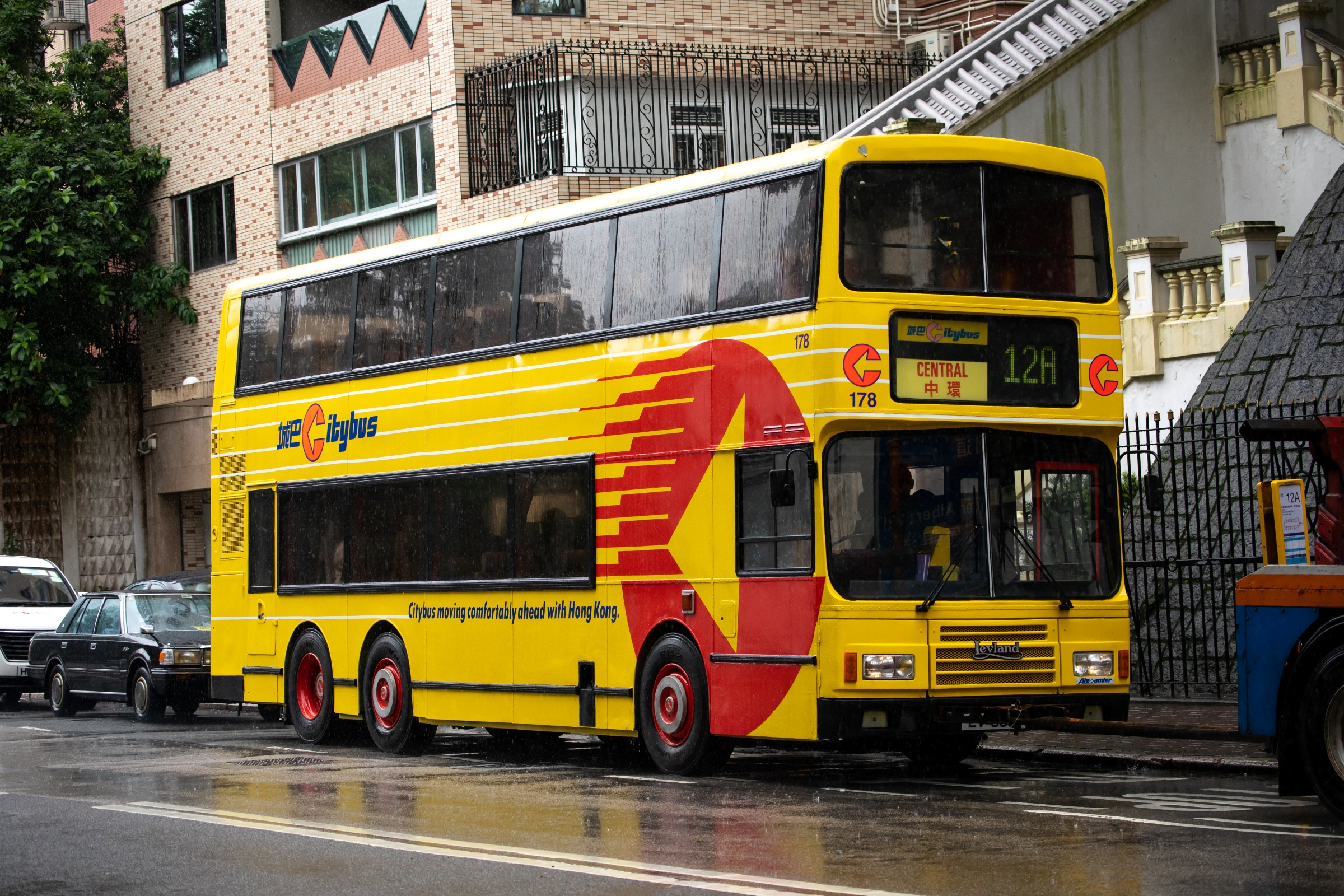
When Citybus reintroduced route 12A, Leyland Olympian double decker buses were used.

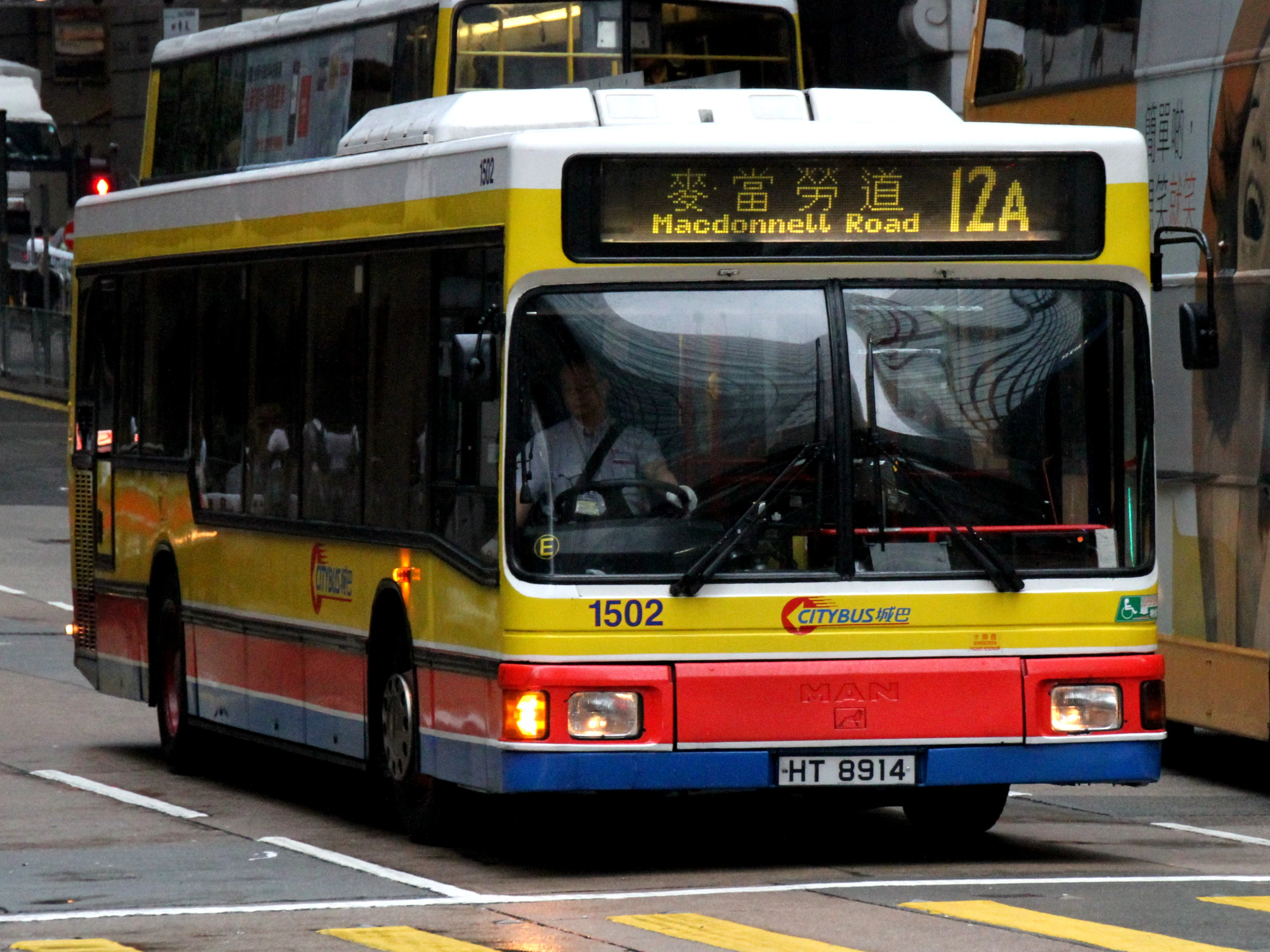
The MAN NL262, which had a higher capacity than other single deck buses, was introduced on route 12A in 1998.

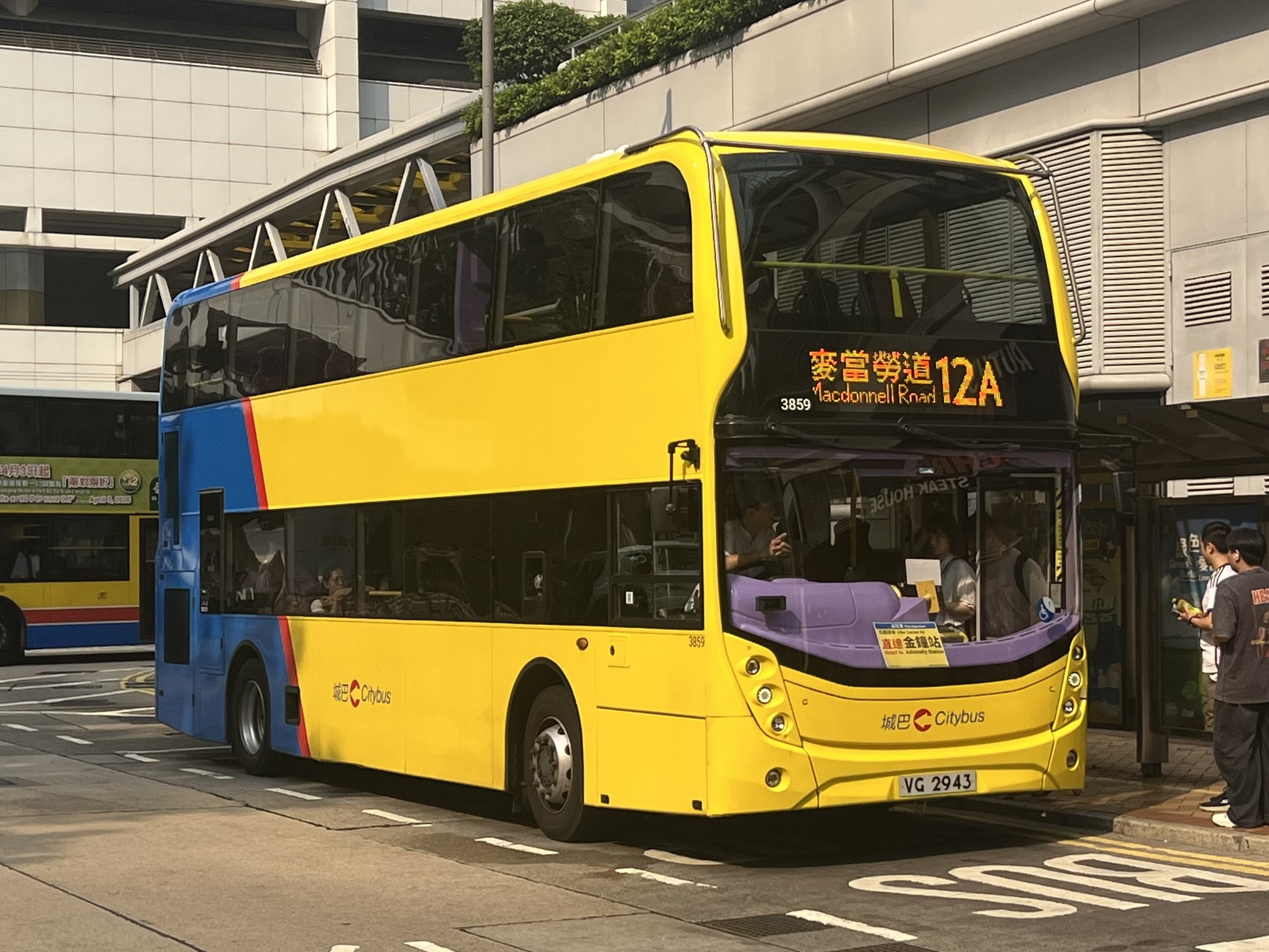
Double decker buses were reintroduced on route 12A in April 2026.

== Ridership ==
According to a Wah Kiu Yat Po report on 23 October 1991, within the first month of route 12A's Citybus operations, the average daily ridership is 1,700, with ridership "steadily rising since mid-September".

The Transport Department (TD) observed the ridership of route 12A at MacDonnell Road on 6 June 2013 during morning peak hours, and found that the average number of passengers on each bus between 08:30 and 09:30 was 25, with 35% occupancy. In a similar survey on 1 June 2022, the average occupancy was at 54%. TD found that while some passengers could not board the first bus due to full capacity, all waiting passengers were able to board the subsequent bus seven minutes later.

Route 12A serves the MacDonnell Road and Kennedy Road school districts, and is one of the only two bus routes serving housing estates along MacDonnell Road (the other being Hong Kong Island public light bus route 1A). Some commuters have thus criticised that the route is unable to cope with the demand, particularly during school reporting and dismissal hours, and pointed out that route 12A can sometimes have a frequency of over 30 minutes during non-peak hours.
