= St. Paul's Co-educational College =

Secondary School in Hong Kong

- 聖保羅男女中學
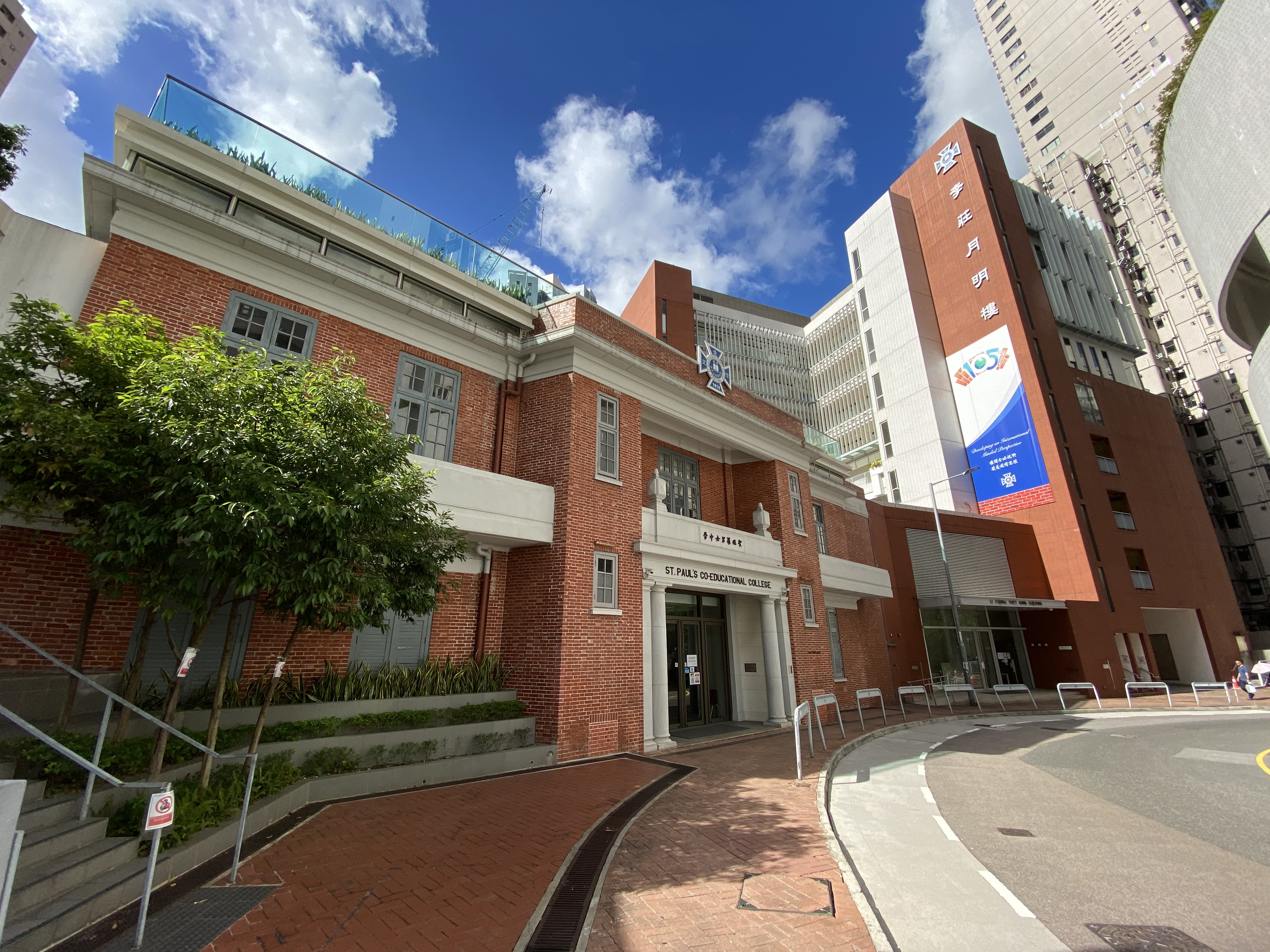
- St. Paul's Co-educational College in 2021

Location
- 33 MacDonnell Road, Mid-Levels, Hong Kong; 22°16′33″N 114°09′30″E

Information
- Type: Grant, DSS, secondary, co-educational, day, boarding, through-train.
- Motto: Faith, Hope and Love (1 Corinthians 13:13)
- Established: 1915; 111 years ago (as St. Paul's Girls' College)
- Principal: Frederick Poon Siu Chi
- Forms: Form 1 to Form 6
- Enrollment: approx. 1,200
- Average class size: 14-34 (varies according to subject combination)
- Language: English, Chinese
- Website: www.spcc.edu.hk

St. Paul's Co-educational College
- Traditional Chinese: 聖保羅男女中學
- Simplified Chinese: 圣保罗男女中学
Transcriptions
Standard Mandarin
- Hanyu Pinyin: Shèngbǎoluó Nánnǚ Zhōngxué
Wu
- Romanization: ^{5}sen-pau_{3}-lu_{2} ^{2}noe-gniu_{4} ^{2}tson-ghoq_{8}
Yue: Cantonese
- Jyutping: sing3 bou2 lo4 naam4 neoi5 zung1 hok6

St. Paul Girls' College
- Traditional Chinese: 聖保羅女書院
- Simplified Chinese: 圣保罗女书院
Transcriptions
Standard Mandarin
- Hanyu Pinyin: Shèngbǎoluó Nǚ Shūyuàn
Wu
- Romanization: ^{5}sen-pau_{3}-lu_{2} ^{4}gniu-syu_{1}-yoe_{6}
Yue: Cantonese
- Jyutping: sing3 bou2 lo4 neoi5 syu1 jyun6*2

St. Paul's Co-educational College (SPCC; Chinese: 聖保羅男女中學) is an Anglican, full-day secondary school located at 33 MacDonnell Road, Mid-Levels, Hong Kong. It was founded in 1915 as a girls-only school until the outbreak of World War II, after which it was converted into a co-educational school. It is the first school in the Round Square network in Greater China, and offers the HKDSE and IBDP curricula in parallel. It, along with its affiliated primary school, has also been under the Direct Subsidy Scheme since 2001.

The school's motto is Faith, Hope and Love, which is taken from 1 Corinthians 13 of the Bible.

== History ==
The college was founded in 1915 as St. Paul's Girls' College (聖保羅女書院) by the Hong Kong Anglican Church. One of the founders was Kathleen Stewart, sister of Arthur Dudley Stewart and Evan George Stewart who ran St. Paul's College, Hong Kong.

In 1918, the College was the first school in Hong Kong to require students to wear school uniforms. In 1927, the College was moved to 33 MacDonnell Road, and has remained as the location of the school since then.

In 1932, the College adopted the school badge that is still used now.

Amidst the outbreak of the Second World War and Japanese occupation of Hong Kong in 1942, the College suspended all operations. In 1945, the College resumed operation while St. Paul's Boys' College moved in. Since then, the College began to accept both boys and girls, and became the first co-educational school in Hong Kong. As the College transformed from a girls school to a co-educational school, a whole-day primary school was established, and Mr Maak Ying Kei was appointed as the Headteacher of the primary school.

When St. Paul's Boys' College moved back to their campus in Bonham Road in 1950, the school continued to accept both boys and girls, remaining co-educational. Before the primary school changed into an AM and PM school in 1957, it moved to 1 Calder Path. The position of Headteacher in the PM primary school was taken up by Ms Fok Lan Hing. In 1959, the new west wing of the College was completed as part of the secondary school.

In October 1969, the school established their first aid service for boys, the St Paul's Ambulance Cadet Division under Hong Kong St John Ambulance. A Nursing division for girls was later set up.

== Exam results ==
St. Paul's Co-educational College has produced 13 perfect scorers "10As" in the history of Hong Kong Certificate of Education Examination (HKCEE) and 22 "Top Scorers" and "Super Top Scorers" in Hong Kong Diploma of Secondary Education Examination (HKDSE).

7 x 5** "Top Scorers" are candidates who obtained perfect scores of 5** in each of the four core subjects and three electives.

8 x 5** "Super Top Scorers" are candidates who obtained seven Level 5** in four core subjects and three electives, and an additional Level 5** in the Mathematics Extended (M1/M2) module.

== Notable alumni ==
=== Academics ===
- Lawrence J. Lau – former vice-chancellor of The Chinese University of Hong Kong; former member of the Executive Council of Hong Kong
- Arthur Li – member of the Executive Council of Hong Kong; member of the Council of the University of Hong Kong; former Secretary for Education and Manpower of Hong Kong; former Vice-Chancellor of The Chinese University of Hong Kong
- Chung-Kwong Poon – former president of the Hong Kong Polytechnic University
- Kenneth Young – theoretical physicist; Professor of Physics and former Pro-Vice-Chancellor of the Chinese University of Hong Kong
- Ngaiming Mok – Hong Kong mathematician specializing in complex differential geometry and algebraic geometry
- Wai Chee Dimock – Writer, William Lampson Professor Emeritus of American Studies and English at Yale University, Researcher at the Harvard University Center for the Environment

=== Public services / professionals ===
- Vivienne Poy – the first Senator of Canada of Asian descent; former Chancellor of the University of Toronto (the first of Chinese descent)
- Rebecca Chan Chung – Decorated U.S. World War II veteran who served as a Nurse with the Flying Tigers (China), the U.S. Army (China) and the China National Aviation Corporation (China and India), with work including flying over the Hump (1942-1948); the first Head (Sister-Tutor-in-Charge) of the Nursing School of the Tung Wah Group of Hospitals, Hong Kong, 1964-1975; 1933 graduate of St. Paul's Girls School (the forerunner of St. Paul's Co-educational College)
- Andrew Li – former Chief Justice of the Court of Final Appeal of Hong Kong; Also Vice Chairman of the School Council
- Audrey Eu – former member of the Legislative Council of Hong Kong, party leader of the Hong Kong Civic Party, former Chairperson of the Hong Kong Bar Association
- Marvin Cheung – member of the Executive Council of Hong Kong, Chairman of the Council of the Hong Kong University of Science and Technology, Chairman of the Airport Authority Hong Kong
- Moses Cheng – Chairman of the Hong Kong Education Commission, former chairman of the Council and Court of the Hong Kong Baptist University, former member of the Legislative Council of Hong Kong
- Selina Chow – former member of the Executive Council of Hong Kong and Legislative Council of Hong Kong
- Priscilla Leung – Kowloon City District Councilor (Elected)
- Maria Tam – former member of the Executive Council of Hong Kong and Legislative Council of Hong Kong
- Eric Li – former member of the Legislative Council of Hong Kong, former president of the Hong Kong Society of Accountants

=== Business ===
- Johnny Hon – Venture capitalist
- Victor Li – Managing Director of Cheung Kong (Holdings) Limited; elder son of multibillionaire Li Ka-Shing
- Richard Li – Chairman of PCCW; younger son of multibillionaire Li Ka-Shing
- Ronnie Chan – Chairman of Hang Lung Properties
- Adrian Cheng – CEO of New World Development
- Sonia Cheng - CEO of Rosewood Hotel Group
- Kenneth Fok - VP of Fok Ying Tung Group and Sports Federation and Olympic Committee of Hong Kong, China
- Peter Lee Ka-kit - President of Henderson China; elder son of Lee Shau-kee

=== Musicians ===
- Warren Lee – Artist, concert pianist; Music Director of St. Paul's Co-educational College
- Kenneth Chan – Actor
- Danny Chan – Singer
- Michael Kwan – Singer
- Justin Lo – Singer-songwriter
- Samuel Wong – Conductor
- Mark Lui – Songwriter
- Eugene Pao – Jazz guitarist
- Stephen Fung - Singer, actor and director

=== Others ===
- Sham Yen Yi – 2014 Miss Earth China

== See also ==
- Education in Hong Kong
- Lists of schools in Hong Kong
- Robert Kotewall
