= MacDonnell Road =

Street in Hong Kong

Coordinates: 22.27556°N 114.15714°E

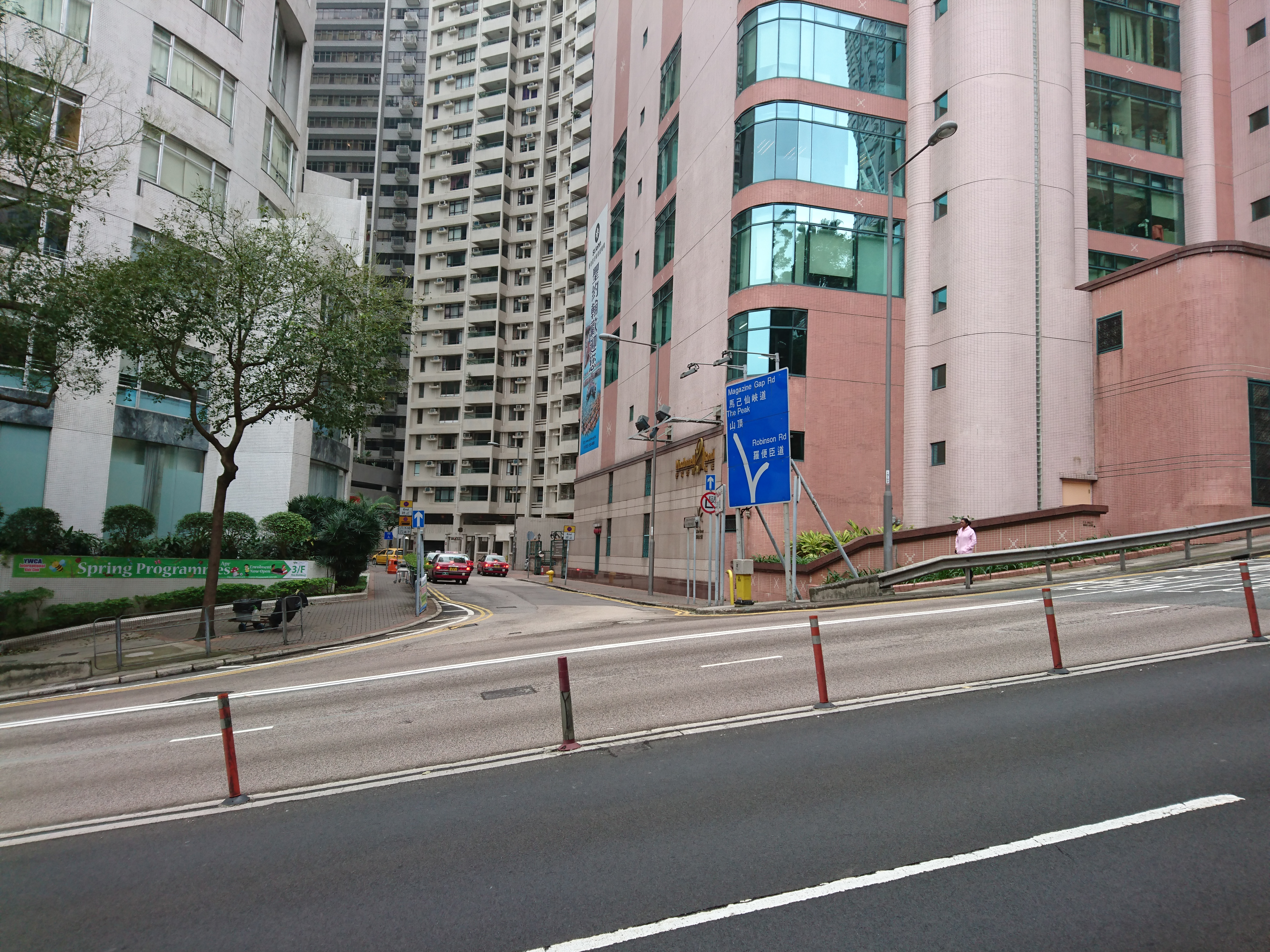
Western end of MacDonnell Road, at its junction with Garden Road. The building on the right is St. John Tower, which houses the headquarters of Hong Kong St. John Ambulance.

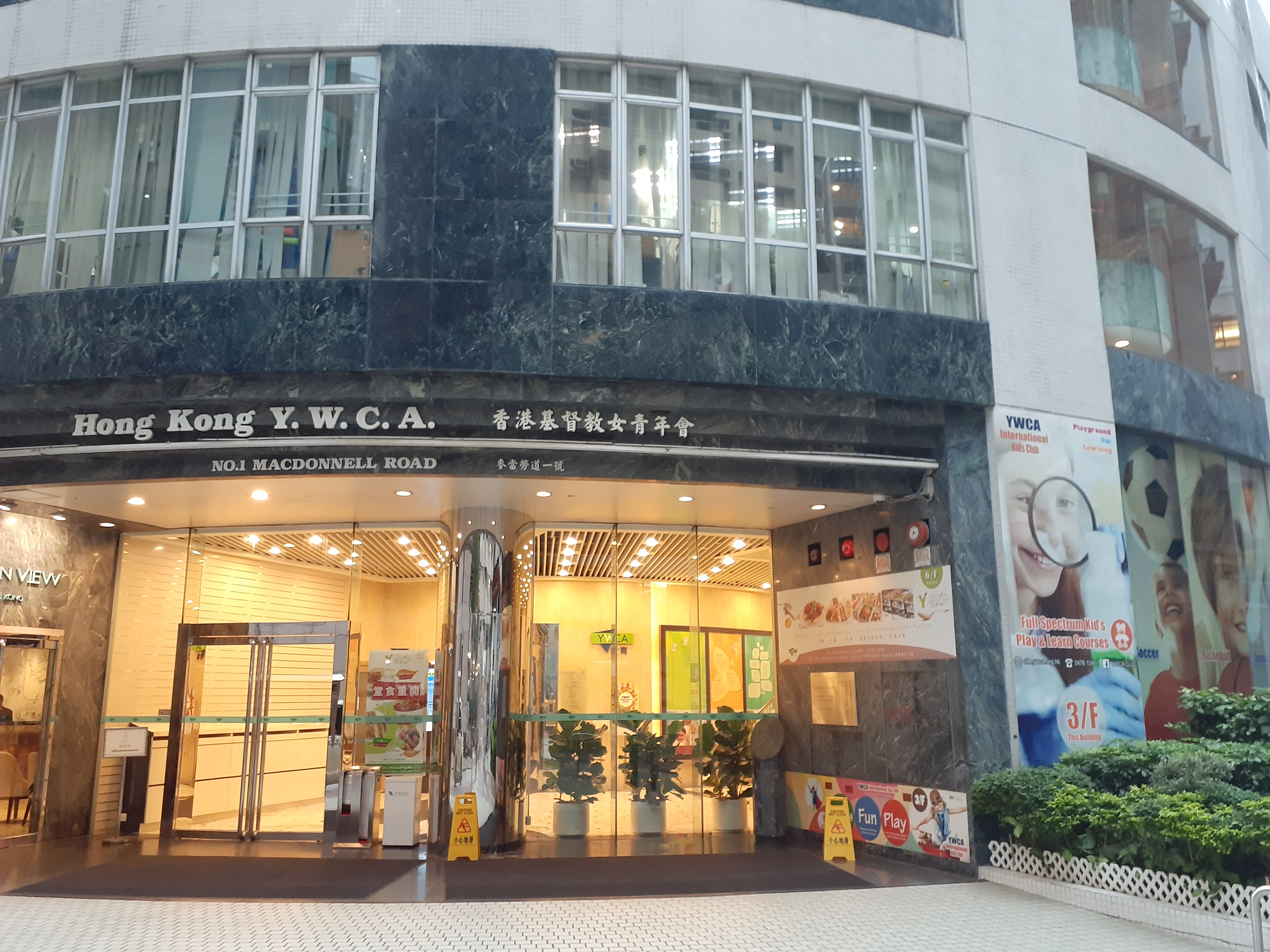
YWCA Hong Kong headquarters at No. 1 MacDonnell Road.

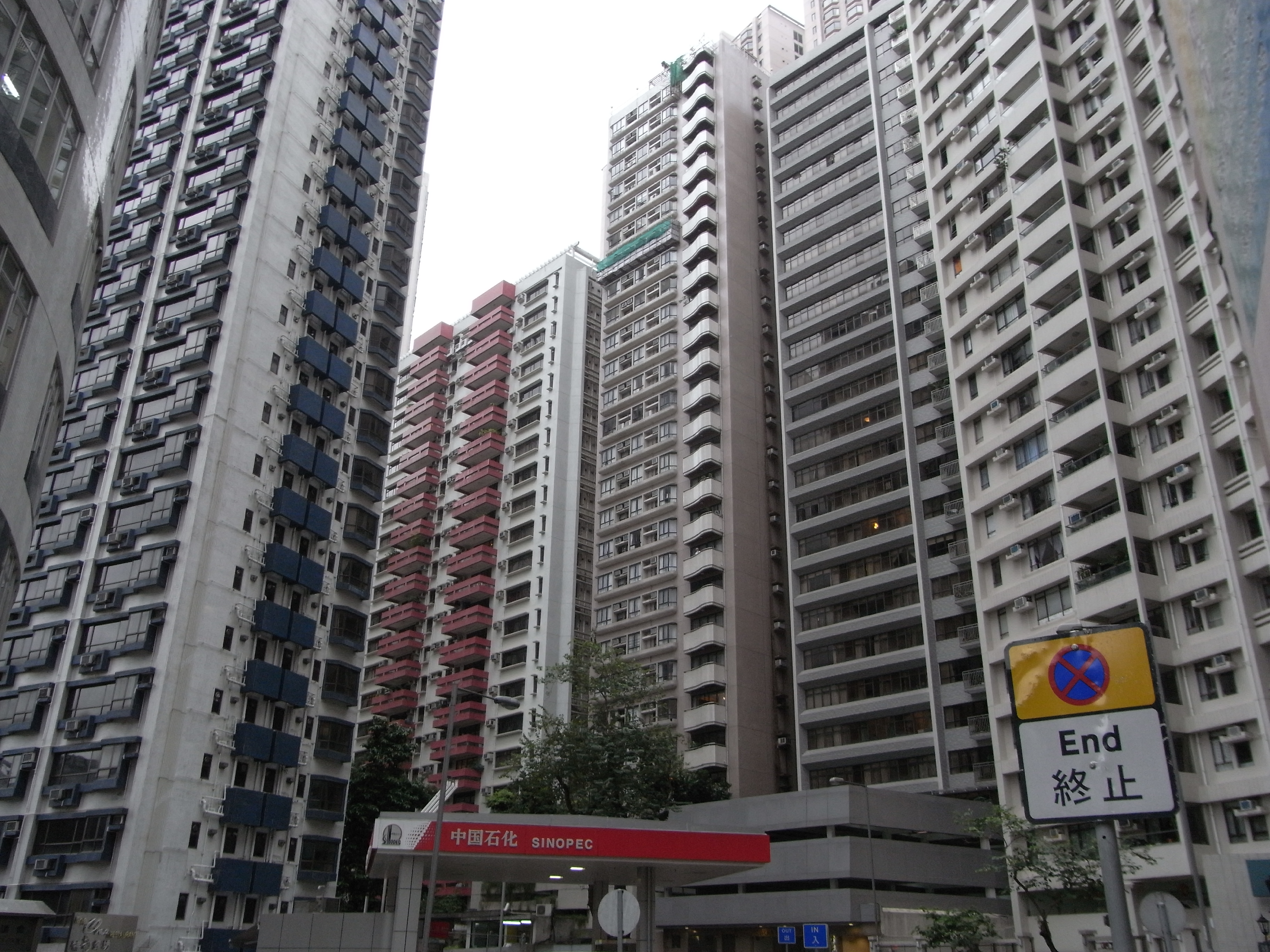
View of MacDonnell Road near its western junction with Garden Road.

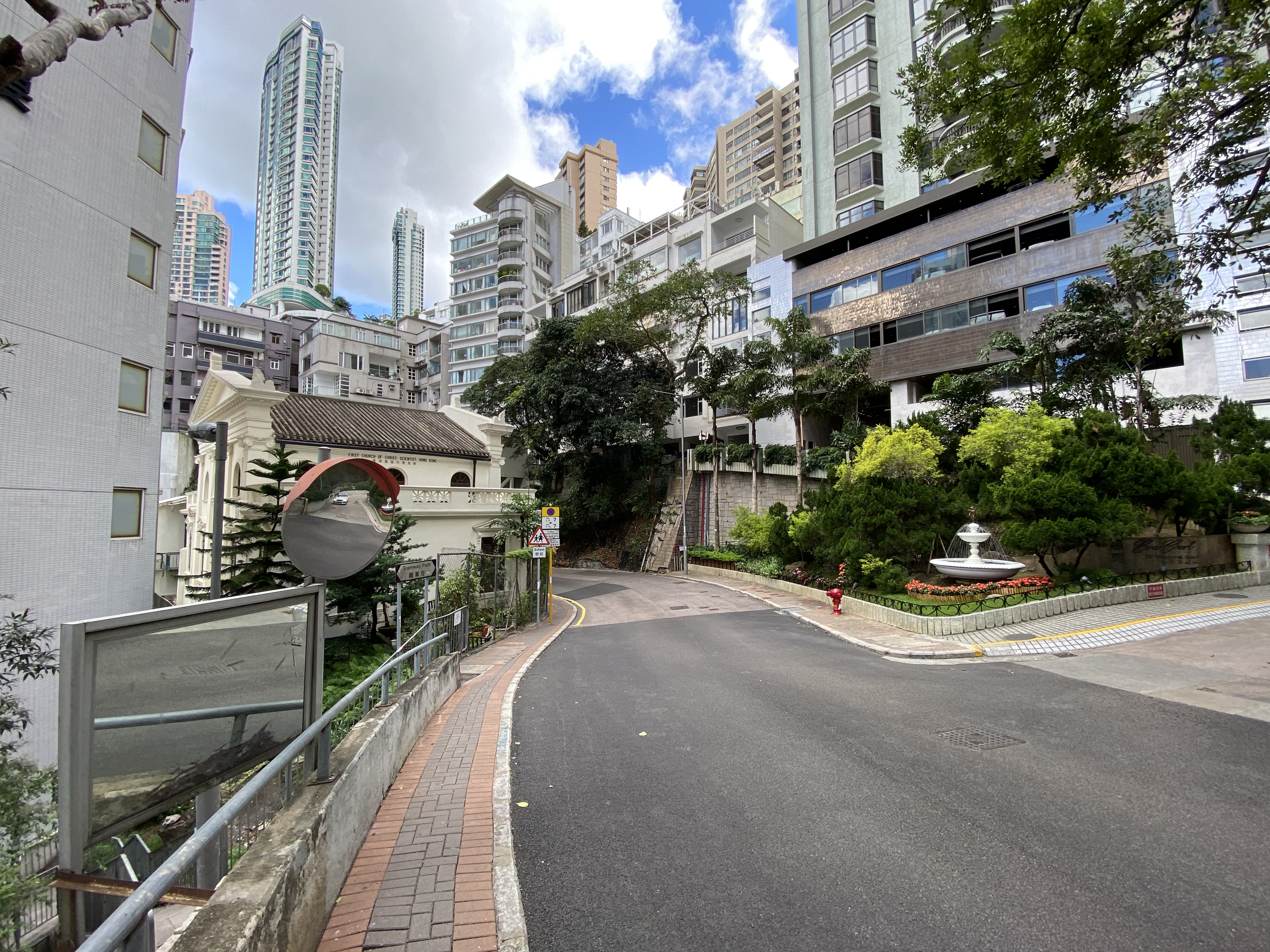
View of MacDonnell Road near MacDonnell Road Bridge.

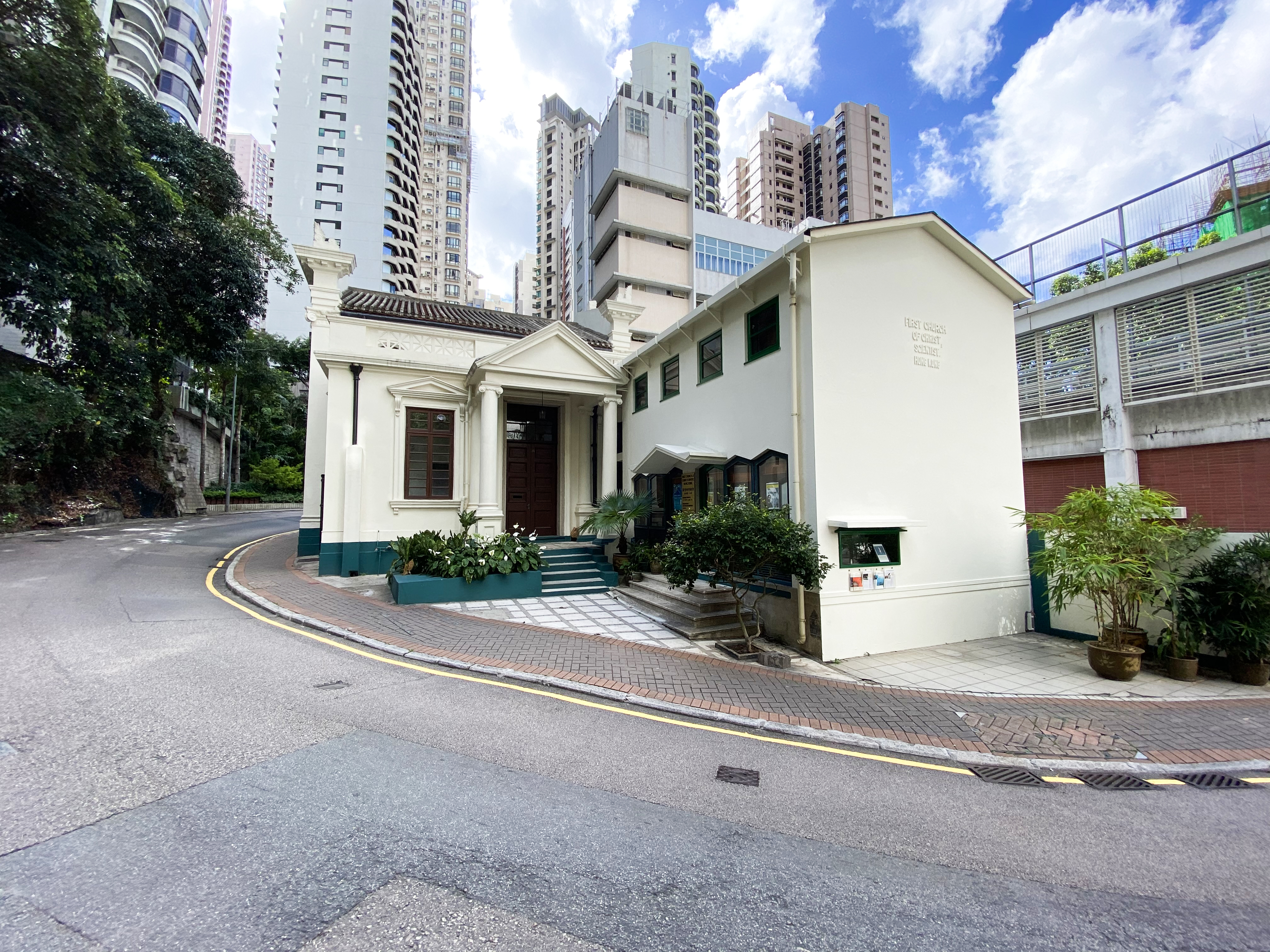
Hong Kong Branch of the First Church of Christ, Scientist along MacDonnell Road.

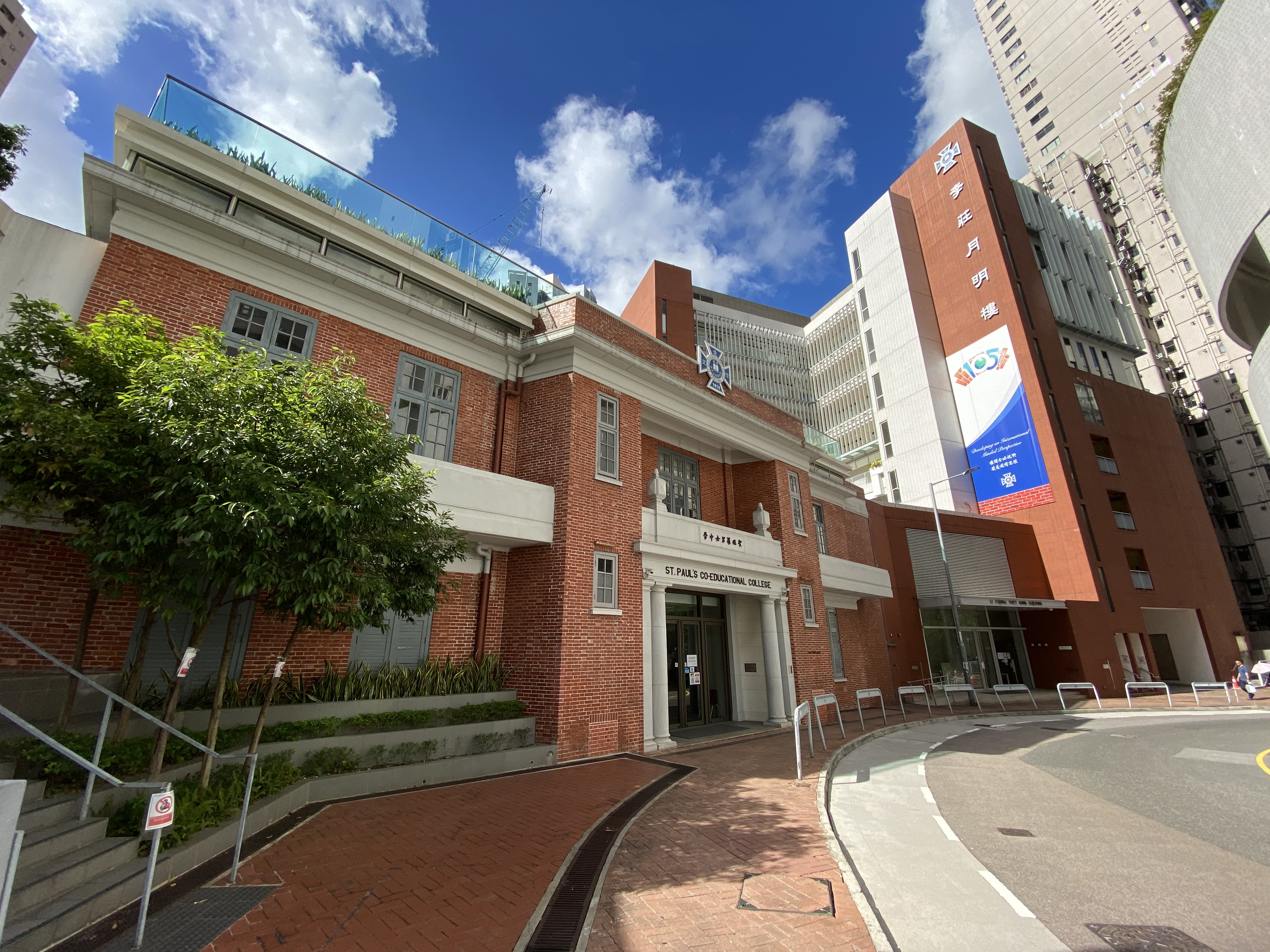
Entrance of St. Paul's Co-educational College on MacDonnell Road.

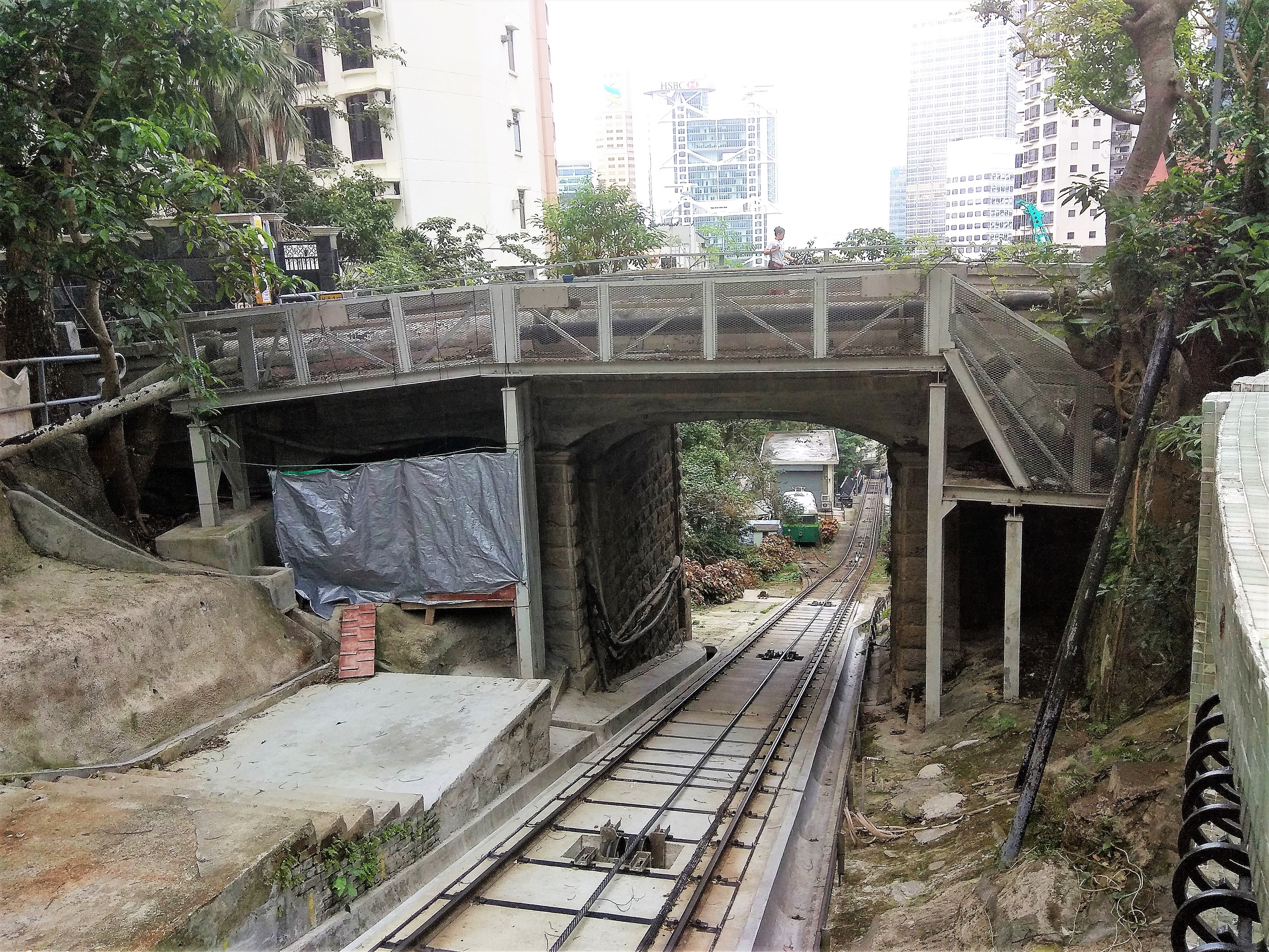
MacDonnell Road crosses the tracks of the Peak Tram at MacDonnell Road Bridge, near MacDonnell Road stop. The current bridge was built in 1938, replacing an older one.

MacDonnell Road (Chinese: 麥當勞道; Cantonese Yale: mak6 dong1 lou4 dou6, formerly 麥當奴道) is a street in the Mid-Levels area of Hong Kong Island.

MacDonnell Road is one of the most expensive roads in Central Mid-Levels, together with Old Peak Road, Magazine Gap Road, Tregunter Path, Bowen Road, Borrett Road, and May Road.

== Location ==
Starting at Garden Road, the road runs westward through the Mid-Levels before terminating at Kennedy Road.

== Name ==
MacDonnell Road is named after former Hong Kong Governor Richard Graves MacDonnell, who was in office from 1866 to 1872. MacDonnell developed Victoria Peak during his tenure.

Several streets in Kowloon, built in the second half of the 19th century, were given names that were duplicates of street names on Hong Kong Island. To avoid confusion, their names were changed in 1909, and MacDonnell Road in Kowloon was renamed Canton Road.

The 1904 book English Made Easy written by Mok Man Cheung, and published in Hong Kong, listed MacDonnell Road as 'Mac Donald Road'.

The Chinese name for the fast food chain McDonald's (麥當勞) is identical to the Chinese transliteration of this road (麥當勞道), where "道" means "Road". The first McDonald's restaurant was opened in Hong Kong in January 1975, and the name was chosen because it represented a "well-known local street".

== History ==
Construction of MacDonnell Road started in 1891 and its first section was completed the following year. The road was extended eastward in 1899, where it formed a junction with Bowen Road at its eastern end.

Crown land lots at MacDonnell Road were let by public auction for 999-year leases as early as 1896. The colonial government ceased offering such long leases after May 1898, and only a limited number of plots on Hong Kong Island and in Kowloon have a lease term of 999 years.

In 1903, parts of MacDonnell Road were infested with anopheles, and malaria was rife there. Nullahs in the area were cleared as a preventive measure.

Before World War II, the area below Victoria Peak was home to people from diverse ethnic backgrounds. Wealthy Japanese were living as high up as MacDonnell Road.

During the Battle of Hong Kong in December 1941, the headquarters of the 2/14th Battalion, Punjab Regiment was located on MacDonnell Road. The 2/14 Punjab were part of the West Brigade, and their tactical area of responsibility stretched along the northwestern shore of Hong Kong Island from Causeway Bay to Belcher's Point, including the defence of the Governor's House and of Major General Maltby's headquarters.

In April 1957, the Chinese name of the road was changed from "麥當奴道" to "麥當勞道", likely because of the negative connotation of "奴" meaning "slave". Since 2023, it became a point of interest for Chinese tourists, posing in front of the street sign with food purchased from McDonald's, as both share the same Chinese name.

== Features ==
Features along the road include:

- No. 1: YWCA Hong Kong headquarters
- No. 2: St. John Tower (聖約翰大樓), which houses the headquarters of Hong Kong St. John Ambulance. The building also houses Two MacDonnell Road, which features serviced apartments.
- MacDonnell Road Bridge. MacDonnell Road crosses the tracks of the Peak Tram at MacDonnell Road Bridge, near MacDonnell Road stop. An existing bridge was demolished and rebuilt using reinforced concrete, supported by granite columns, in 1938.
- No. 31: Hong Kong Branch of the First Church of Christ, Scientist. Built in 1912, this building is the only branch of this religious denomination in Hong Kong. An annexe was added in 1956. The church is listed as a Grade II historic building.
- No. 33: St. Paul's Co-educational College. Founded in 1915 as St. Paul's Girls' College, the college was relocated in 1927 to its current address at No. 33 MacDonnell Road, which was granted by the Government in 1924. The school became Hong Kong's first co-educational school in 1945. The 1927 school building is a Grade II historic building.
- No. 75: Office of the Commissioner of The Ministry of Foreign Affairs of The People's Republic of China in Hong Kong (the address is No. 42 Kennedy Road and No. 75 MacDonnell Road)

== Notable residents ==
- Stanley Ho (1921–2020), Hong Kong-Macau billionaire businessman. Ho grew up in a two-house residence on MacDonnell Road, "with two gardens that ran for half a mile".
- Lee Shau-kee (1928-2025), Hong Kong business magnate. Lee and his family lived in the penthouse at Eva Court (惠苑) at 36 MacDonnell Road from 1984 to the 2010s. The 22-storey residential building had been developed for the Lee family, and was named after Lee Shau-kee's ex-wife, Lau Wai-ken. In 2010, Lee spent HK$1.82 billion for a plot of land on The Peak to build his new home. The newly acquired plot was the most expensive residential site in the world at the time on a per square foot basis.
- Kenny Bee (born 1953), Hong Kong singer, musician, and actor. He released an autobiography in December 2007, titled 麥當勞道 (MacDonnell Road), named after the street he grew up on.

== Cited buildings ==
Several buildings along MacDonnell Road have been cited in books and research articles. They include:

- Cases involving several buildings along MacDonnell Road have contributed to the clarification of the legal definition of "immediate neighbourhood " in Hong Kong. They include the No. 3 MacDonnell Road Case and Nos. 16-18 MacDonnell Road Case.
- Joyce Symons' granduncle, E.H. Ray, lived on MacDonnell Road before World War II. His house was commandeered by the military during the Battle of Hong Kong.
- Noel Croucher bought and redeveloped the property at No. 6 MacDonnell Road in the 1950s. He owned it for many years.

== Conservation ==
The western half of MacDonnell Road is part of the Central Route of the Central and Western Heritage Trail of the Hong Kong Tourist Association. The Route includes the First Church of Christ Scientist Hong Kong and St. Paul's Co-educational College.

== Transportation ==
MacDonnell Road is served by a Peak Tram stop and two bus routes: Citybus Route 12A running from Admiralty, and public light bus Route 1A running from Star Ferry in Central.

== See also ==
- List of streets and roads in Hong Kong
