= The Murray, Hong Kong =

Hotel and historic building in Central

The Murray Hotel
- 香港美利酒店
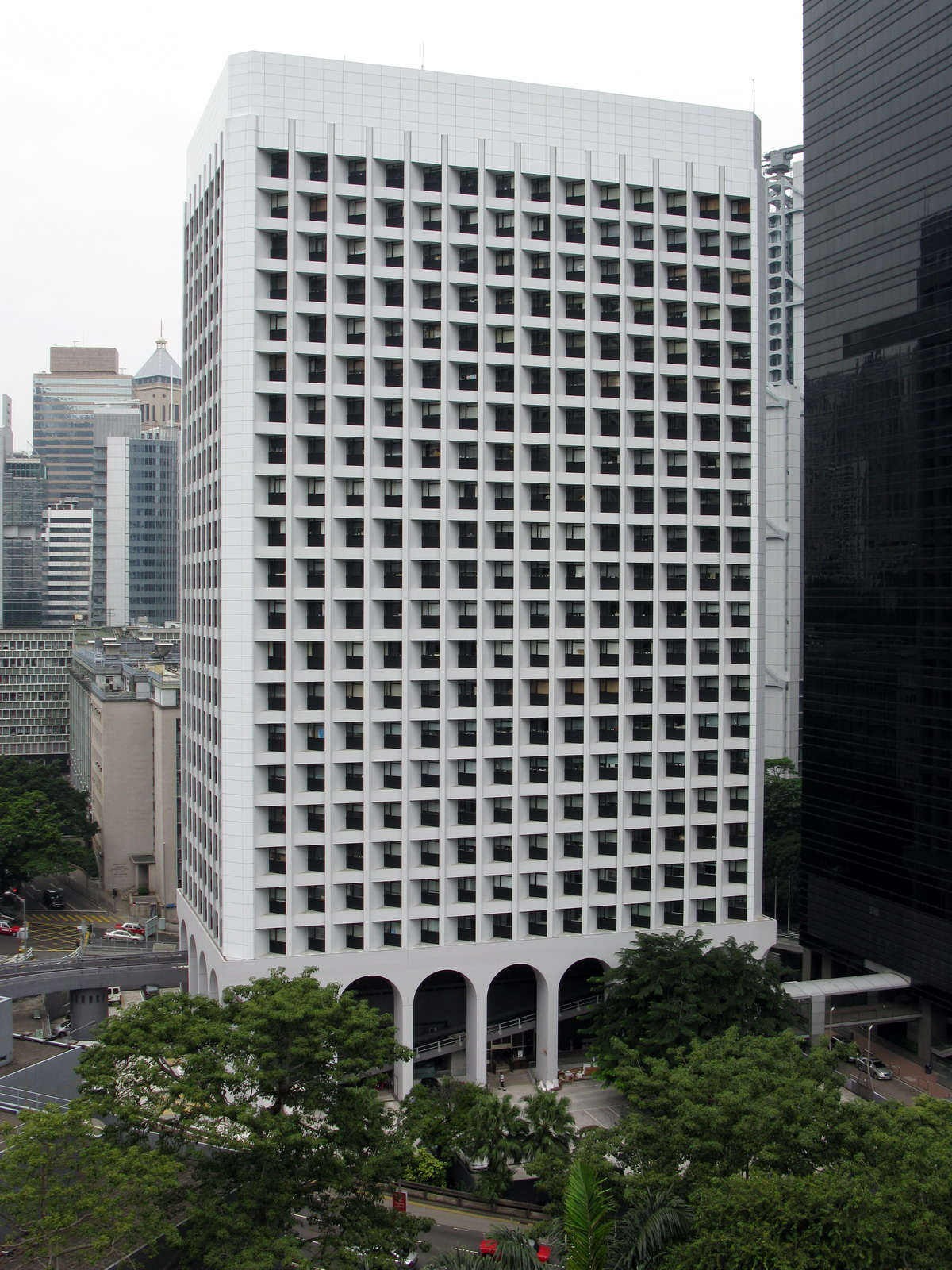
- The Murray
- Interactive map of the The Murray Hotel area

General information
- Type: Government office (until 2011); Hotel (after 2018)
- Location: Central, 22 Cotton Tree Drive, Hong Kong
- Coordinates: 22.2781°N 114.1601°E
- Completed: 1969; 57 years ago
- Renovated: 2018

Technical details
- Floor count: 27

Design and construction
- Architecture firm: Public Works Department

The Murray, Hong Kong
- Traditional Chinese: 香港美利酒店
Transcriptions
Yue: Cantonese
- Yale Romanization: Xiānggǎng měi lì jiǔdiàn
- Jyutping: Heung1 gong2 mei5 lei6 jau2 dim3

The Murray, Hong Kong, a Niccolo Hotel (Chinese: 香港美利酒店) is a hotel in Central, Hong Kong. Previously a government office building known as Murray Building (美利大廈), it was repurposed and the hotel opened in 2018.

Located in a prime spot on 22 Cotton Tree Drive, the Murray Building was designed by the then Public Works Department and completed in 1969. The 27-storey building was the tallest government building at that time. Murray Building was designed with its windows meticulously oriented to avoid intrusion of excessive direct sunlight. This design won the Certificate of Merit of the Energy Efficient Building Award in 1994. Another outstanding design feature of the Murray Building, which is surrounded by major roads on all sides, is its vehicular entrance which is neatly knitted into the steep Cotton Tree Drive.

== Sale controversy ==
In 2006, the construction plan for a new headquarter at Tamar was confirmed. In the 2009 policy address, Chief Executive Sir Donald Tsang said the Murray Building would be converted into a 300-room hotel upon relocation of its current offices. Murray Building has high potential to be converted into a hotel given its prime central location close to the Peak Tram Garden Road lower terminus and Hong Kong Park, coupled with the great demand for high-end hotels in the area. With appropriate conversion and associated supporting facilities, the new hotel is expected to be a popular destination for visitors. Conversion is also an environmentally preferred option.

Tsang originally said the government would retain ownership of the building, but development officials on 2 March 2010 said the building, as well as its title-related rights, will be put up for tender next year, with the successful bidder given a 50-year ownership lease. Quizzed on the apparent about-face, officials said the latest proposal is "current policy." Deputy Secretary for Development Gracie Foo Siu-wai admitted the deal will be a "land sale," with the ownership of Murray Building and the site passing to the successful bidder for 50 years. The winning developer will not be required to submit its master layout to the Town Planning Board for approval, she said. There are no plans for a special mechanism to monitor the maintenance of the building after the sale or any restriction on a further sale or transfer, she said.

Central and Western District Council chairman Chan Tak-chor expressed outrage at the government's decision, taken without public consultation. A SCMP/TNS survey from April to May 2011 found that most elite respondents backed a government proposal to lease the Murray Building to the private sector. Among the 1,001 opinion leaders interviewed, including writers, businessmen, lobbyists and strategists, 61% of respondents supported leasing the Murray Building to the private sector, with only 15 percent against.

== Conversion ==
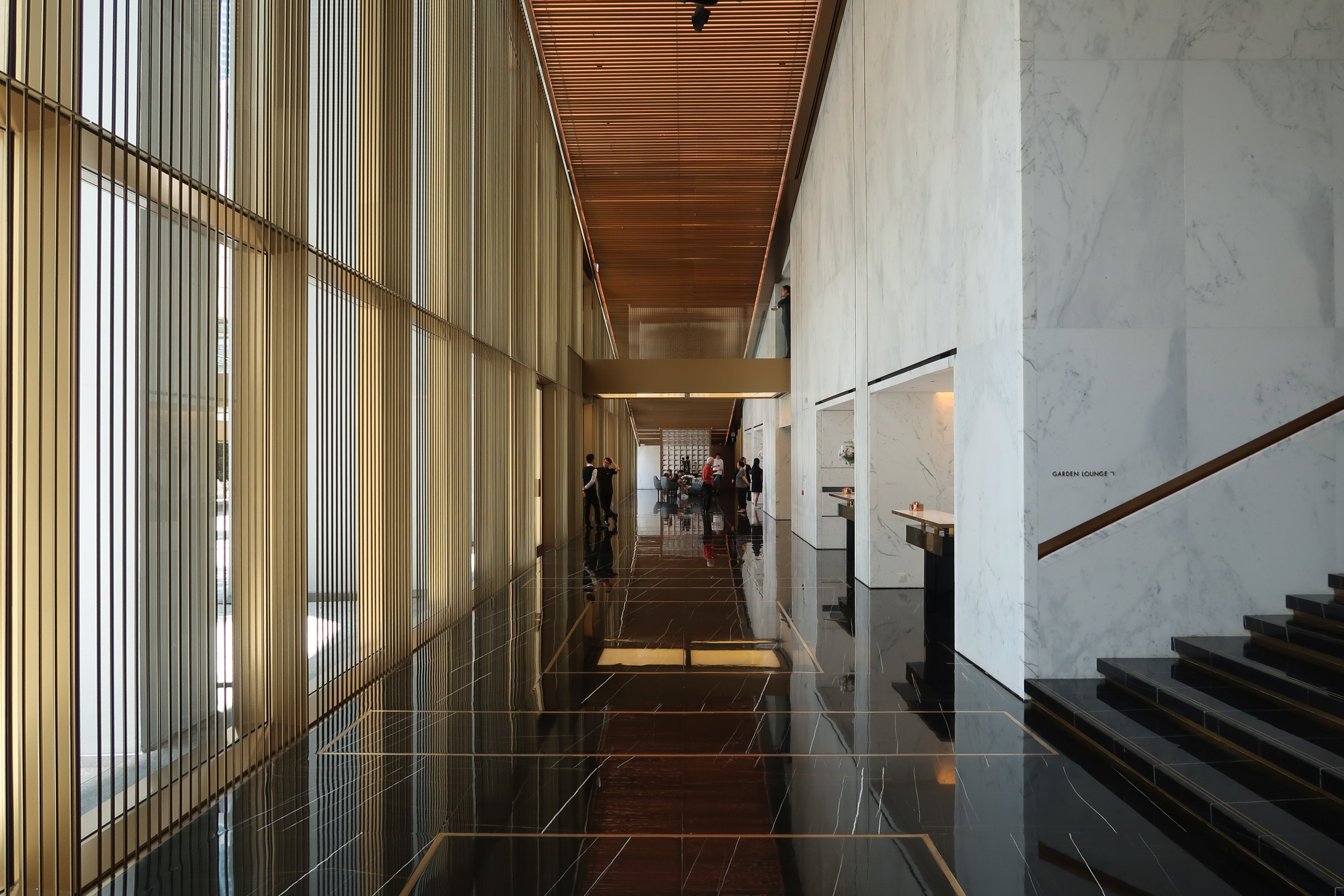
Lobby of The Murray

The new Central Government Complex at Tamar was completed in 2011, and by the end of the year, the Murray Building became vacant upon relocation of its current offices to the new complex, including some of the key decision making bureaus of the Hong Kong government. The building was then auctioned off for re-development into a hotel by the Lands Department in December 2011.

The building was re-purposed as a hotel and opened in 2018.

== See also ==
- Murray Barracks
