= Cotton Tree Drive =

Road in Hong Kong

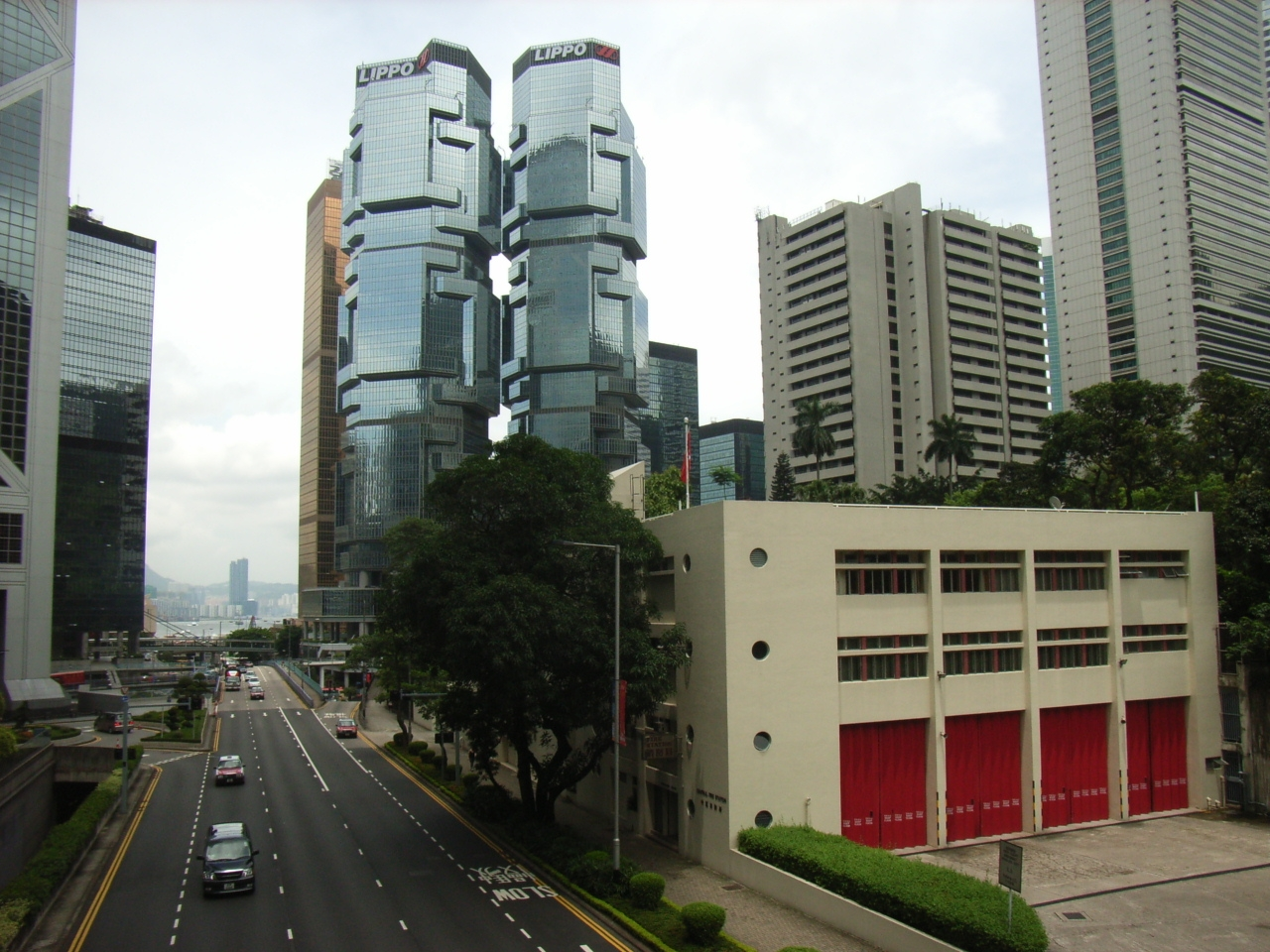
The north of Cotton Tree Drive in July 2006. Central Fire Station and Lippo Centre are visible.

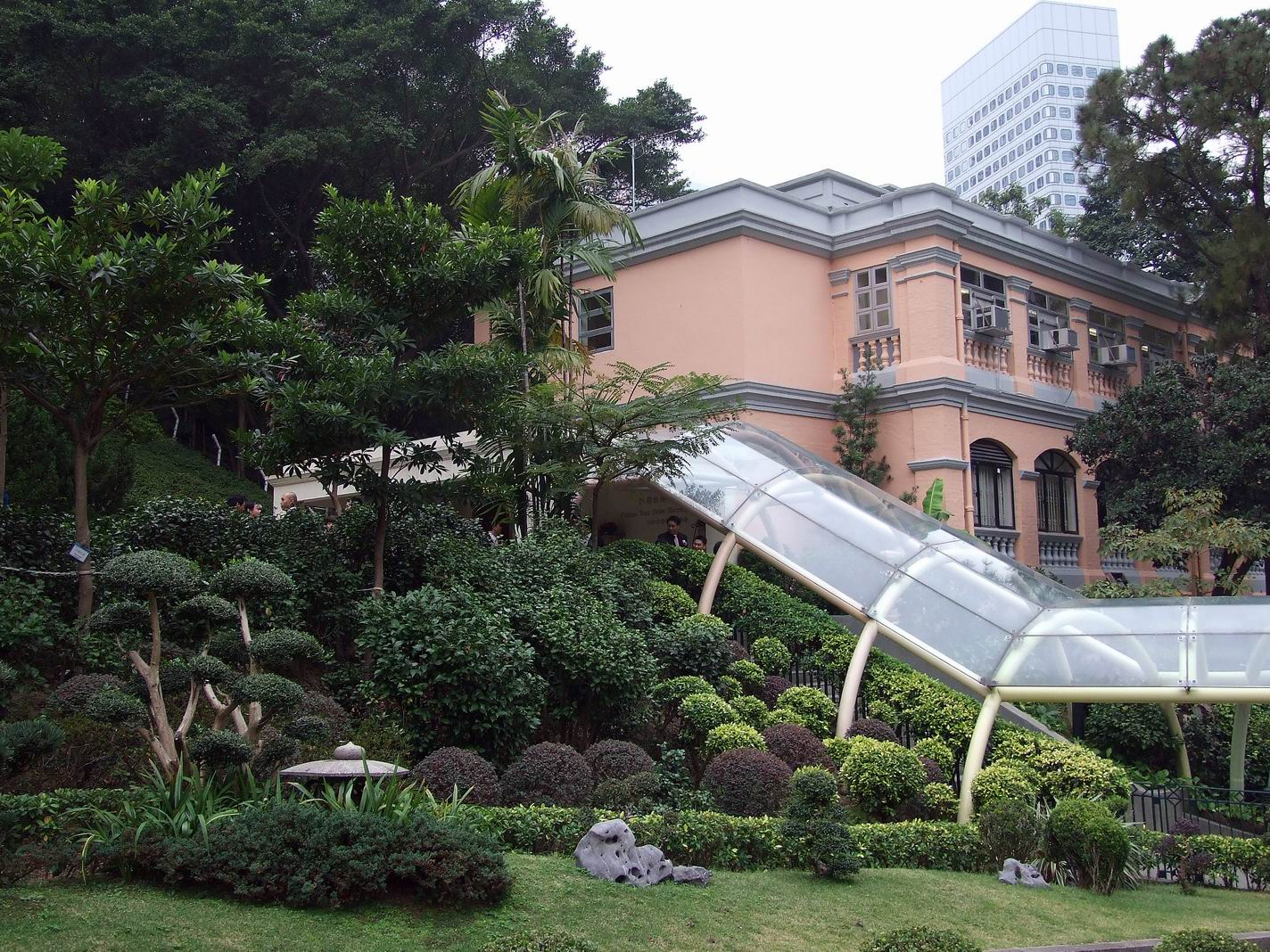
The Cotton Tree Drive Marriage Registry in December 2007, located at No. 19 Cotton Tree Drive, is housed in the former Rawlinson House of Old Victoria Barracks, now within Hong Kong Park. It is a Grade II historic building.

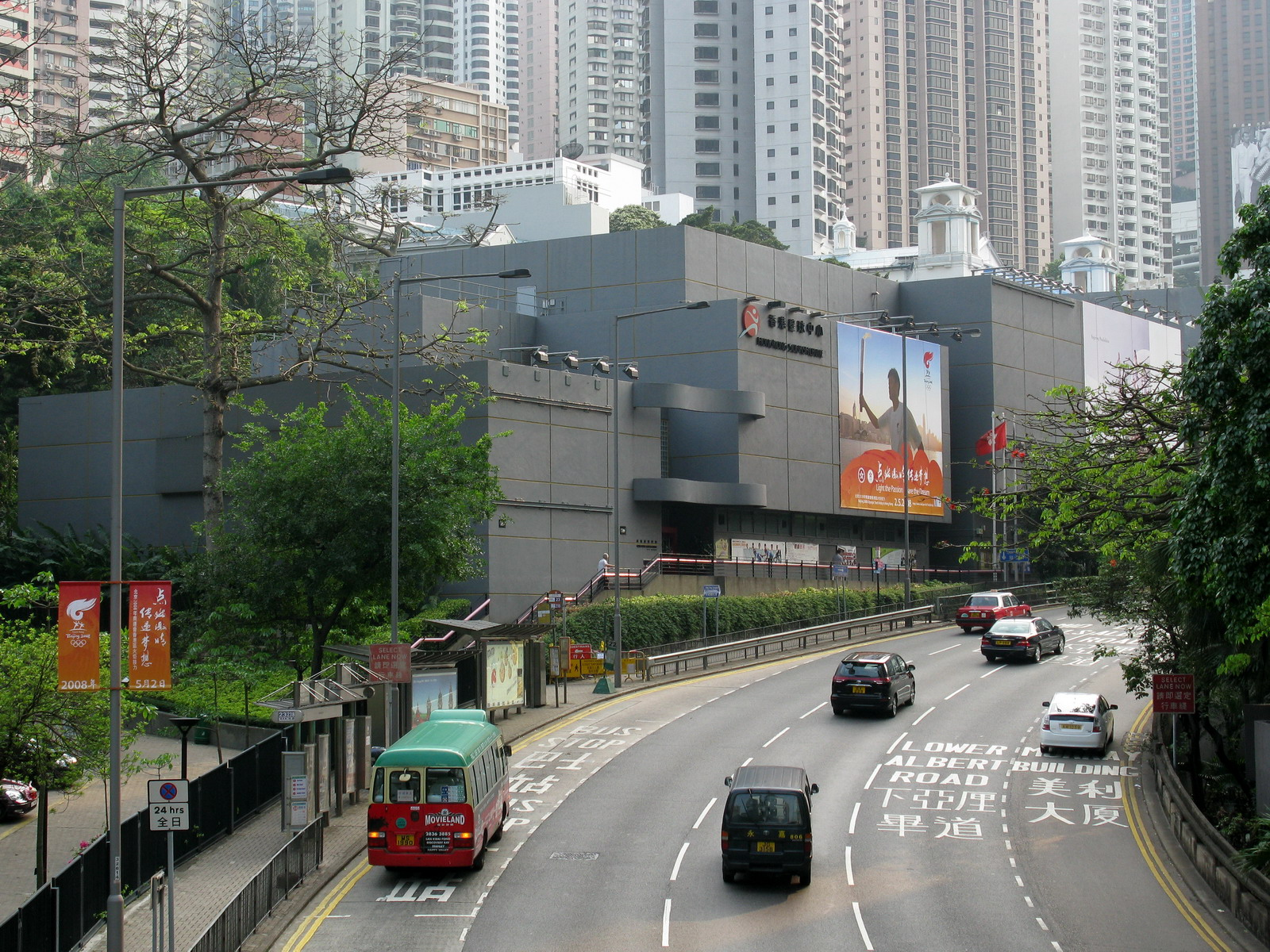
Hong Kong Squash Centre along Cotton Tree Drive in April 2008.

Cotton Tree Drive (Chinese: 紅棉路) is a road running from Central to Mid-Levels, Hong Kong Island, Hong Kong. The road is famous for the Cotton Tree Drive Marriage Registry, a hotspot for marriage registration inside Hong Kong Park. It used to be known as Kapok Drive.

The road starts from Harcourt Road and runs with flyovers over Queensway. It then drives uphill and ends in Garden Road with a branch to Kennedy Road.

The road is featured in Project Gotham Racing 2 along with Harcourt Road and many others from various locations.

== Major buildings ==
- Far East Finance Centre
- Lippo Centre
- Flagstaff House (#10), within Hong Kong Park
- Central Fire Station (#15)
- Cotton Tree Drive Marriage Registry (#19), within Hong Kong Park
- Murray Building (#22)
- Hong Kong Squash Centre (#23)
- Hong Kong Park Sports Centre (#29)
- Peak Tram lower terminus: Garden Road stop, located on the bottom floor of St. John's Building
- St. Joseph's College

== See also ==
- List of streets and roads in Hong Kong
