= St. John's Building =

Building in Central, Hong Kong

Coordinates: 22.277729°N 114.159172°E

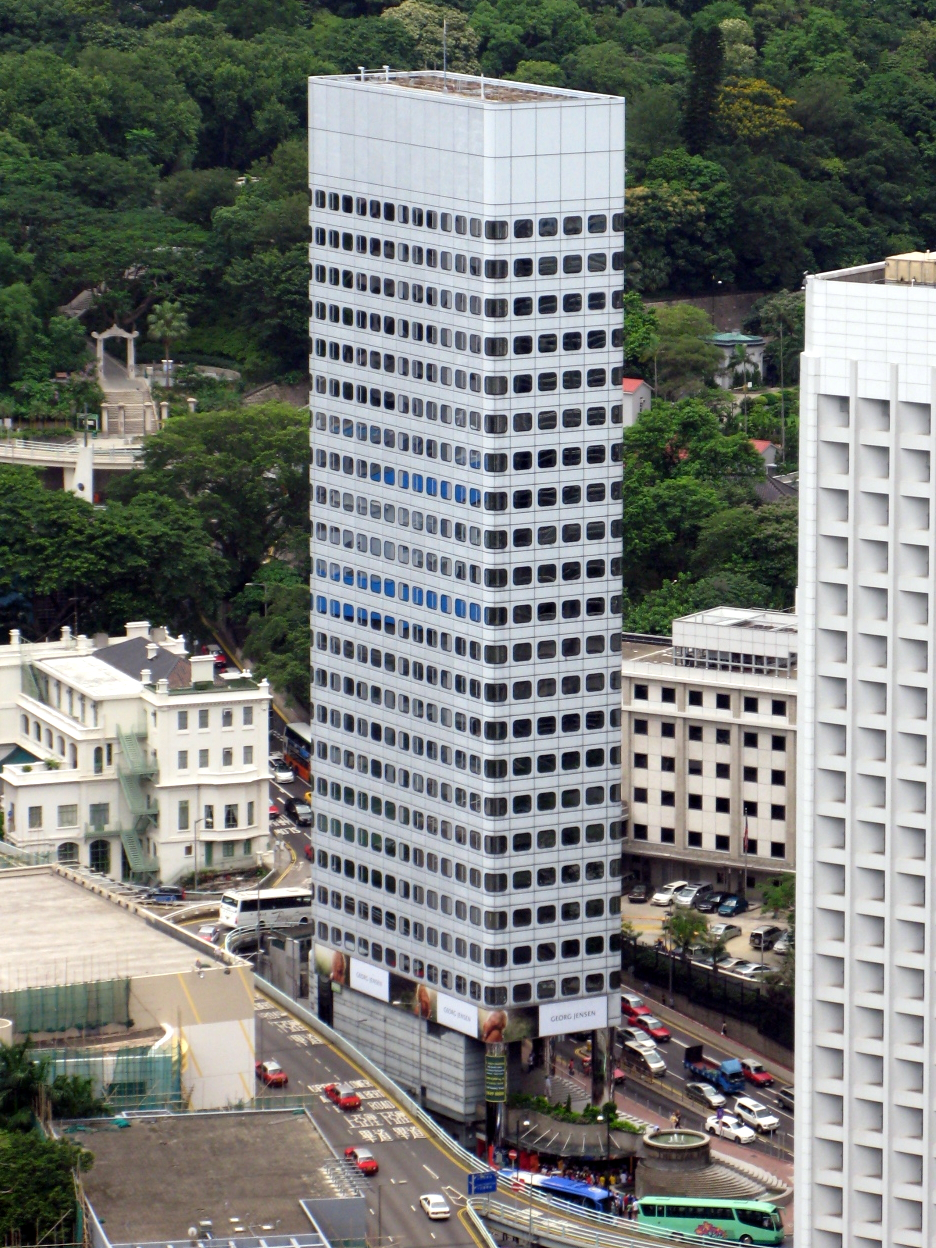
- Interactive map of the St. John's Building area

General information
- Location: 33 Garden Road; Central, Hong Kong
- Completed: 1983; 43 years ago
- Owner: The Hongkong and Shanghai Hotels, Limited

Technical details
- Floor count: 22

Design and construction
- Architects: Kwan, Ng, Wong & Associates
- Main contractor: Hip Hing Construction

St. John's Building (Chinese: 聖約翰大廈) is a skyscraper in Central on Hong Kong Island of Hong Kong. Owned and operated by Hongkong and Shanghai Hotels, it is built on the slope beside Garden Road and Cotton Tree Drive. The ground floor serves as the Garden Road terminus of the Peak Tram.

== History ==
In 1889, the Garden Road station for the Peak Tram opened. In 1935, a new lower terminus was built along with the St John's Apartments: a reinforced concrete building, with eight studio flats and a two-bedroom penthouse. In 1964, the apartments were demolished and a modern 14-storey commercial and residential building was erected in its place.

In 1983, it was in turn replaced by the current 22-storey skyscraper designed by Kwan, Ng, Wong & Associates and built by Hip Hing Construction, it won the Silver Medal of the Hong Kong Institute of Architects in the same year.
