= Hong Kong St. John Ambulance =

Hong Kong charitable ambulance service

- Formation: 1884
- Type: Charitable organisation
- Headquarters: St. John Tower, 2 MacDonnell Road, Hong Kong
- Location: Hong Kong
- Official language: Cantonese, English
- President, Hong Kong St. John Ambulance: Chief Executive of Hong Kong (Incumbent: John Lee)
- Council chairman: Dr. Chung Chin-hung KStJ
- Association Director: Dr. Donald Li Kwok-tung SBS CStJ JP
- Brigade Commissioner: Mr. Dave Yau Shu-fung KStJ
- Staff: 7 300
- Website: www.stjohn.org.hk youth.stjohn.org.hk

Hong Kong St. John Ambulance (Chinese: 香港聖約翰救護機構; Jyutping: hoeng1 gong2 sing3 joek3 hong3 gau3 wu6 gei3 kau3; Cantonese Yale: heūng góng sing yeuk hong kau wuh geī kau) is a charitable organisation with a long history stretching back over a century and has been serving the community since 1884. Adhered to its motto, "For the Service of Mankind", the organisation is dedicated to providing first aid and ambulance services in emergency, dental care for the handicapped, and courses on first aid and home nursing for the general public. Notably, Hong Kong St. John Ambulance is the only branch of St John Ambulance to provide free dental services as part of their regular services. St John Ambulance is the only non-governmental organisation that provides emergency ambulance services in Hong Kong.

== History ==
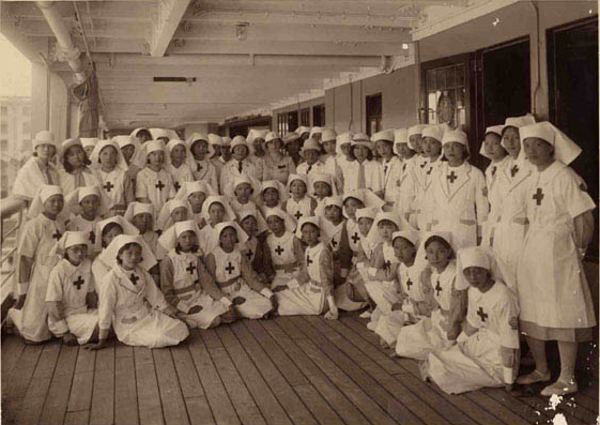
Hong Kong St. John Ambulance Brigade in 1930s

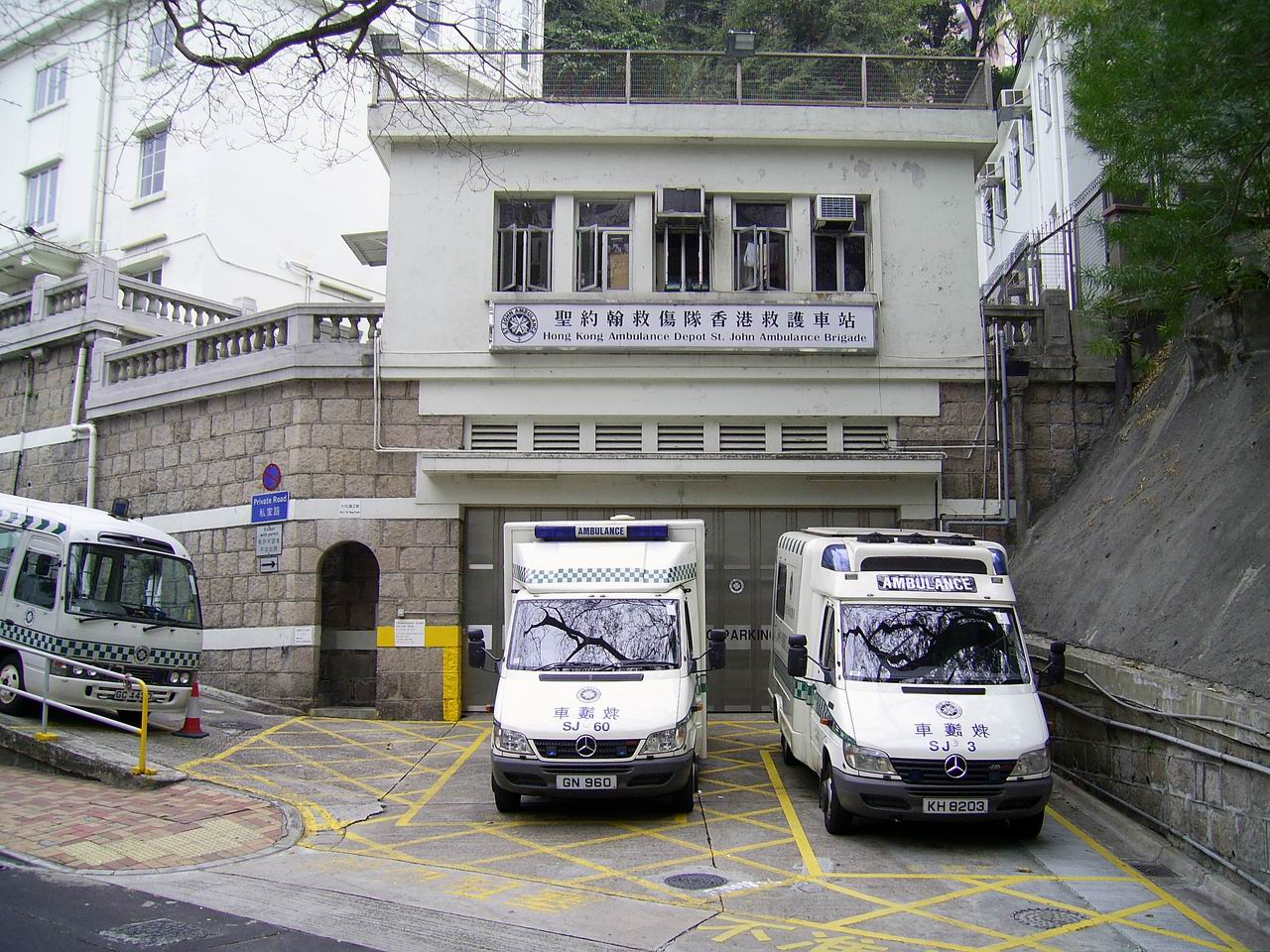
Ambulance depot at 2 Tai Hang Road, Causeway Bay, Hong Kong Island

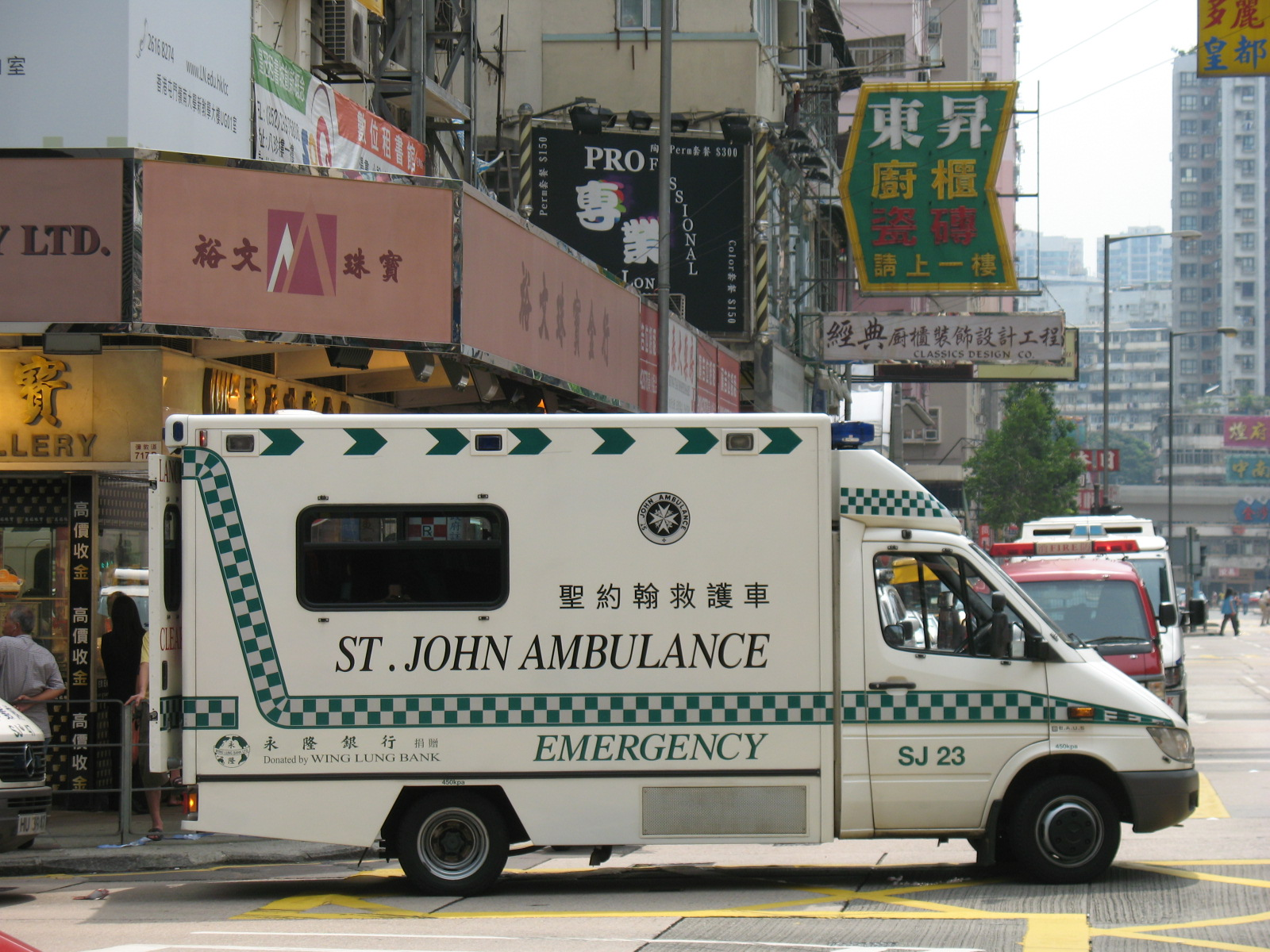
A St John Ambulance is in service in Hong Kong

The Hong Kong St. John Ambulance Association was established in 1884, followed by the Ambulance Brigade in 1916, the Council in 1949 and the Priory in 2015.

Since its establishment, St. John in Hong Kong has been operating under the Order of St. John Ordinance Chapter 1047 in the laws of Hong Kong, and in accordance with the regulations given by St. John Headquarters in London with his Majesty the King as the Sovereign Head of the Order.

St. John in Hong Kong provided emergency medical service to the British Hong Kong military during the Japanese invasion of Hong Kong in December 1941 (World War II). Dr. Wai-Cheung Chau (周懷璋,1893–1965), was present in the battle at Magazine Gap as a medical officer of St John Ambulance. While he was in a car, the person sitting next to him was killed and he was wounded by a bullet through his lung. The blood clot in his lung was with him for the rest of his life.

To facilitate a smooth transition for the services and operation of the St. John Council for Hong Kong after the sovereignty change over in 1997 and to enable St. John in Hong Kong to exist as an independent organisation free from the direction of the Order of St. John in United Kingdom, except for a fraternal relationship, a new Hong Kong St. John Ambulance Incorporation Ordinance (Chapter 1164) was enacted by the Legislative Council on 27 June 1997. Under the new Ordinance, the old Council, the Association and the Brigade are now incorporated as a body corporate and have the new corporate name of Hong Kong St. John Ambulance, while the nature of the works of St. John remains unchanged.

After the handover in 1997, the organisation answers directly to the Chief Executive of Hong Kong. The organisation has been running since on an independent basis from the UK.

== Organization ==
The St. John Council is the governing body of the organisation, responsible for policy making, fund raising, allocation of resources, and providing support and co-ordination of the functions of the St. John Ambulance Association and Brigade.

St. John Ambulance Association is responsible for training members of the public in the principle and the practice of First Aid, Home Nursing and other allied subjects, together with publication of textbooks to facilitate such instruction. It also organises examinations and issues certificates of proficiency to successful candidates. Modest fees are charged for courses and examinations.

St. John Ambulance Brigade, the service arm of St. John, is responsible for the organisation, training and equipment of men, women and young persons to undertake, on a voluntary basis, either as individuals or as organised groups, First Aid, Home Nursing and allied activities in public places, or elsewhere as occasions may require, for welfare to those in need. The service is free.

Under the leadership of the Commissioner, the Brigade has a strength of over 6,000 volunteers who are trained to be efficient and competent at all times to perform public duties in the following aspects:

- Ambulance services
- first aid service
- dental care for the handicapped
- cadet service

== Hong Kong Island Command ==
Hong Kong Island Command of the Hong Kong St. John Ambulance Brigade consists of three(3) Regions, namely Administrative Region, Hong Kong Island East Region and Hong Kong Island West Region.

== Kowloon Command ==
Kowloon Command of the Hong Kong St. John Ambulance Brigade consists of three(3) Regions, namely Administrative Region, Kowloon East Region and Kowloon West Region.

== New Territories Command ==
New Territories Command of the Hong Kong St. John Ambulance Brigade consists of three(3) Regions, namely Administrative Region, New Territories East Region and New Territories West Region.

== Youth Command ==
The Cadet Command of Hong Kong St. John Ambulance Brigade was established in 1948. Its objective is to train teenagers (aged 12 to 18) in First Aid, Home Nursing, and encourage them to develop their interest in social and practical skills such as Road and Home Safety, Community Care, etc. which are conductive to their development to becoming good citizens. It is hoped, too, that the Cadet Command will lay the foundation for membership of the Ambulance and Nursing Divisions of the Brigade. At present, all Cadet Divisions are established in secondary schools, with the exception of two open divisions composed of cadets that are from schools that do not have an established corps.

The Cadet activities are multifarious. Cadets will participate in Leadership Training Programmes and receive training in other proficiency subjects such as Fire Fighting, Canoeing, Camping, Life Saving, Rock Climbing, Map Reading, Cookery, etc.

Cadet Region has been reformed as Cadet Command on 1 May 2007, and expanded into Youth Command (HKI&K) and Youth Command (NT) on 1 January 2014.

=== Basic structure ===
Commander: Mr Yau Shu Fung OStJ

Youth Command is under the overall management of 2 Assistant Commissioner with four Chief Superintendents, who are looking after the four regions, namely Region H, Region K, Region NTE, Region NTW.

== Hong Kong St. John Ambulance Brigade Band ==
Hong Kong St. John Ambulance Brigade Band was established in 1935 as an independent organisation. The Brigade Band was only met when the need to perform arises. During the 2015 restructuring of the Brigade, the Hong Kong St. John Ambulance Brigade Band was officially established on the 1st of May. 50 officers and members of the Brigade join the band, the membership consisted of members from different regions who kept their original posts in the Brigade.

The Brigade Band was mainly a pipe band and played traditional Scottish music. The bagpipes were the band's main instrument and were accompanied by drums. The Band slowly expanded into classical music and Chinese traditional music. The band performed in festivals, footdrill parades and inspections.

In order to align with the restructuring of the Brigade framework, it was reorganized and incorporated into the Brigade Training School in 2018 from the Hong Kong Island Region. It was then reorganized and renamed as the Bagpipe Team and incorporated into the Support Region in 2020, until it was dissolved by Administrative Order on April 1 of the same year.

== Facilities locations ==
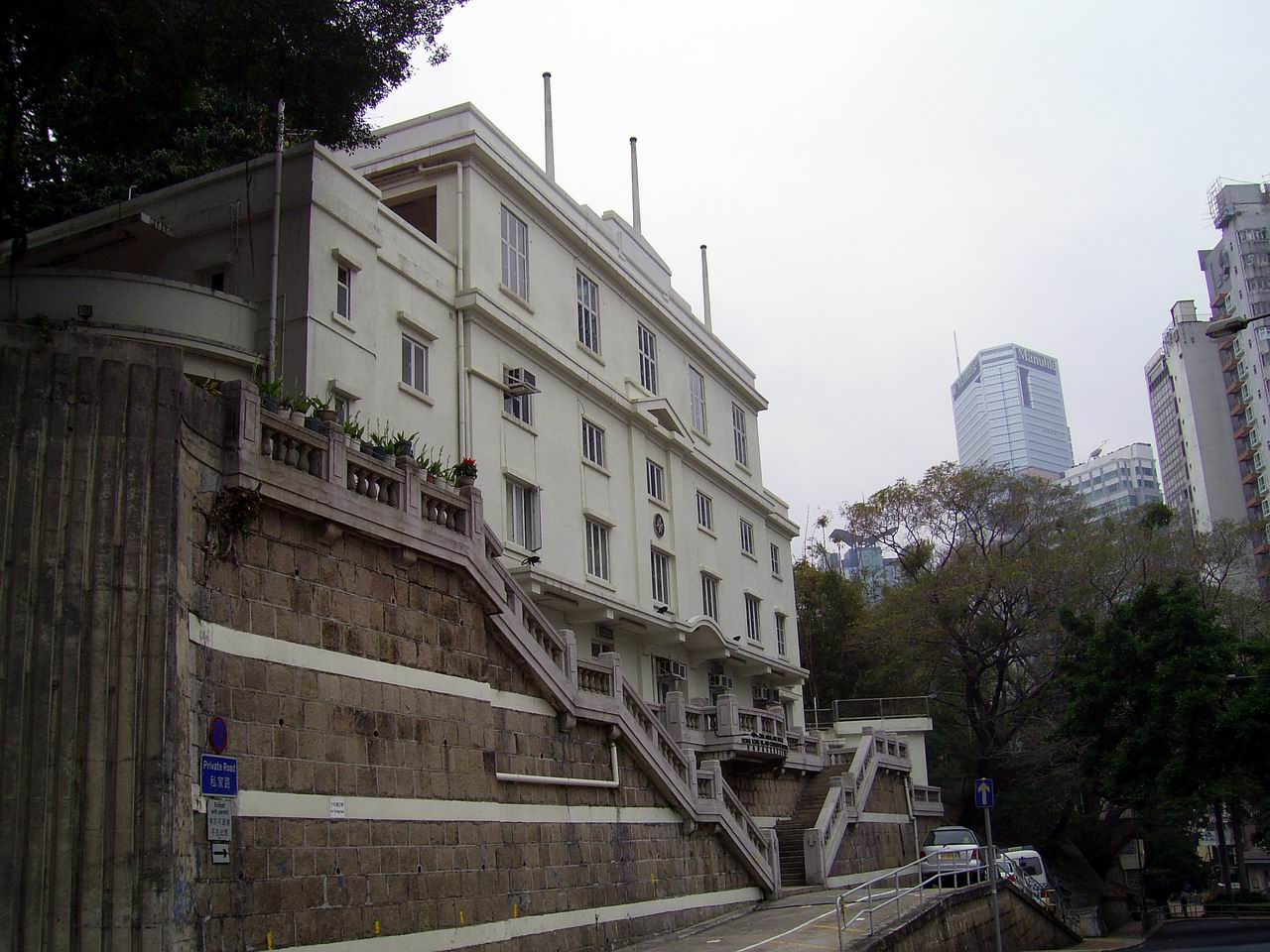
Hong Kong Island Command headquarters, at 2 Tai Hang Road.

The St. John Ambulance Headquarters is at 2 MacDonnell Road, Mid-Levels, Hong Kong Island, which has been reconstructed to accommodate a hotel to guarantee a financial income.

The Hong Kong Island Command headquarters has since moved to 2 Tai Hang Road, Causeway Bay in a historical building built in 1935, overlooking the Central Library and Victoria Park. It is also an ambulance depot for the Brigade.

The Kowloon Command headquarters is located next to Kowloon Hospital at 10 Princess Margaret Road, and to date has a footdrill ground and classrooms for lessons and activities. The Kowloon ambulance depot is not too far away on Princess Margaret Road, Ho Man Tin.

The New Territories' headquarters is located at 28 Tin Ping Road in Sheung Shui, mainly as an ambulance depot. It acts as the de-facto headquarter of the 24/7 professional ambulance service of the Brigade and where the call centre of the aforementioned service is located.

== See also ==
- St. John Ambulance
- Service Medal of the Order of St John
- Insignia of the Venerable Order of St John
