= Kennedy Road, Hong Kong =

Road on Hong Kong Island, Hong Kong

Coordinates: 22.27633°N 114.15842°E

Kennedy Road
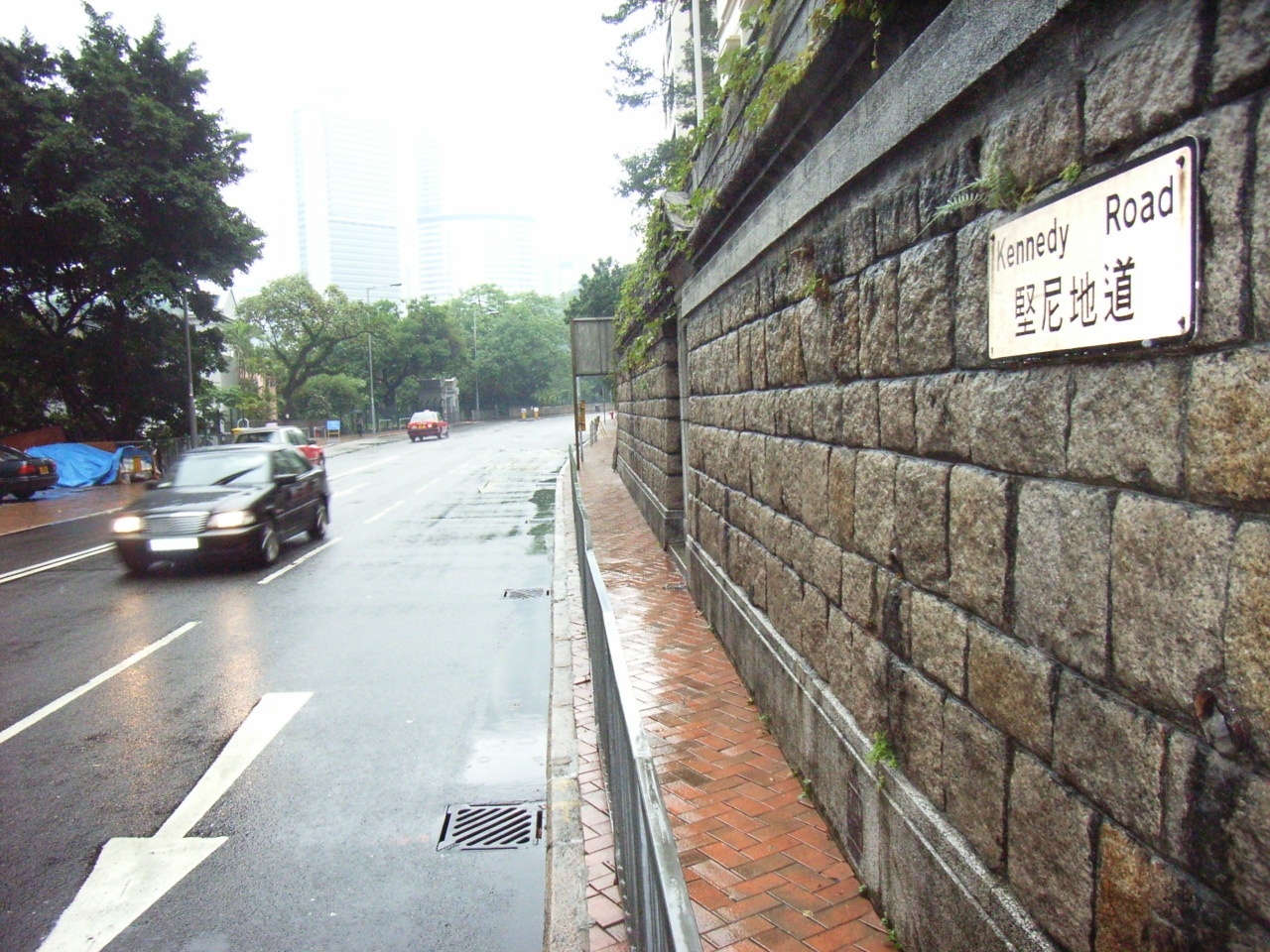
- A road sign along Kennedy Road
- Interactive map of Kennedy Road
- Native name: 堅尼地道 (Yue Chinese)
- Namesake: Sir Arthur Kennedy
- Location: Mid-Levels, Hong Kong
- East end: Queen's Road East
- West end: Upper Albert Road / Garden Road

Kennedy Road, Hong Kong
- Traditional Chinese: 堅尼地道
Transcriptions
Yue: Cantonese
- Yale Romanization: Gīn nèih deih douh
- Jyutping: Gin1 nei4 dei6 dou6

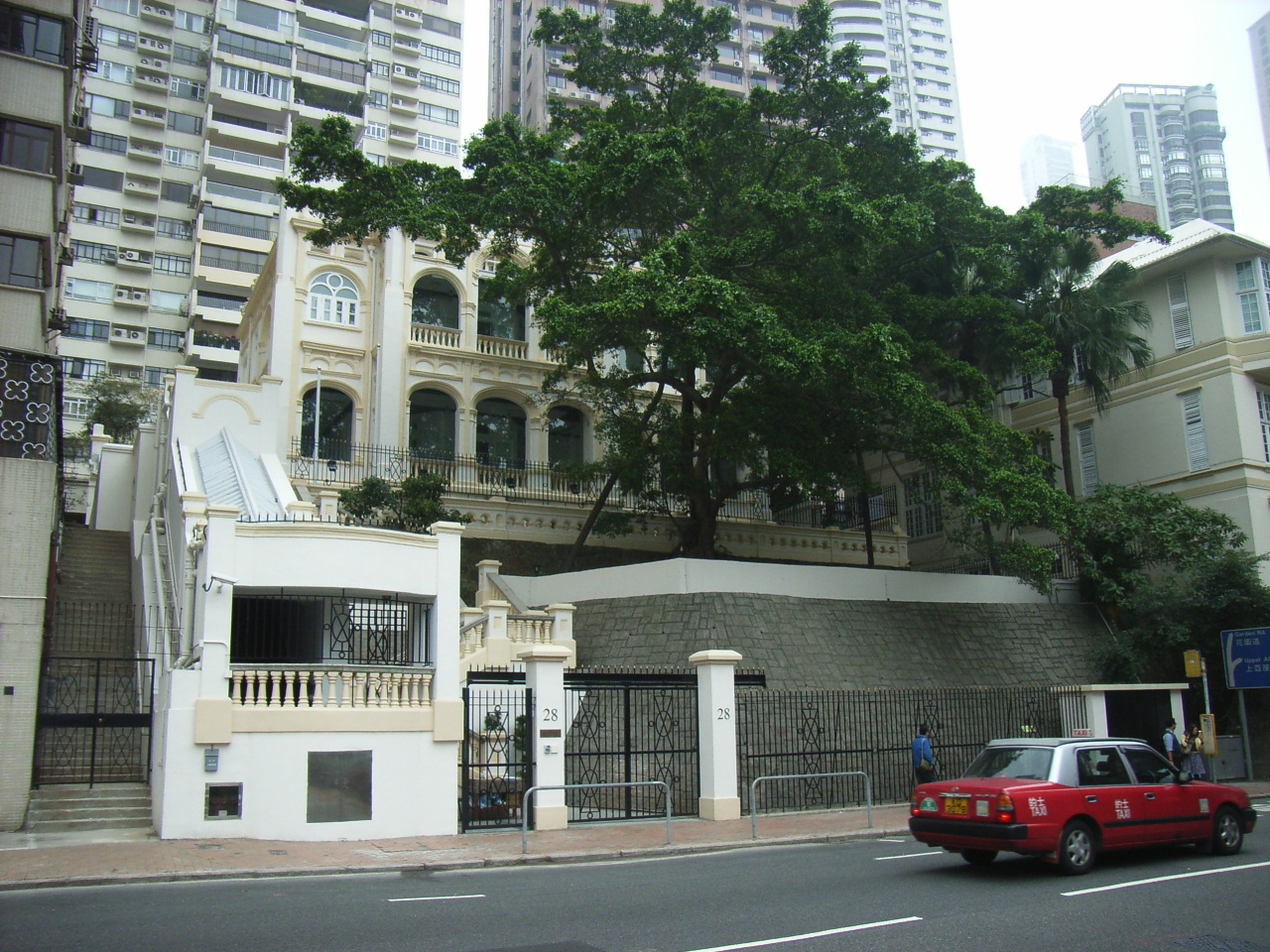
Office of Former Chief Executives at No. 28 Kennedy Road

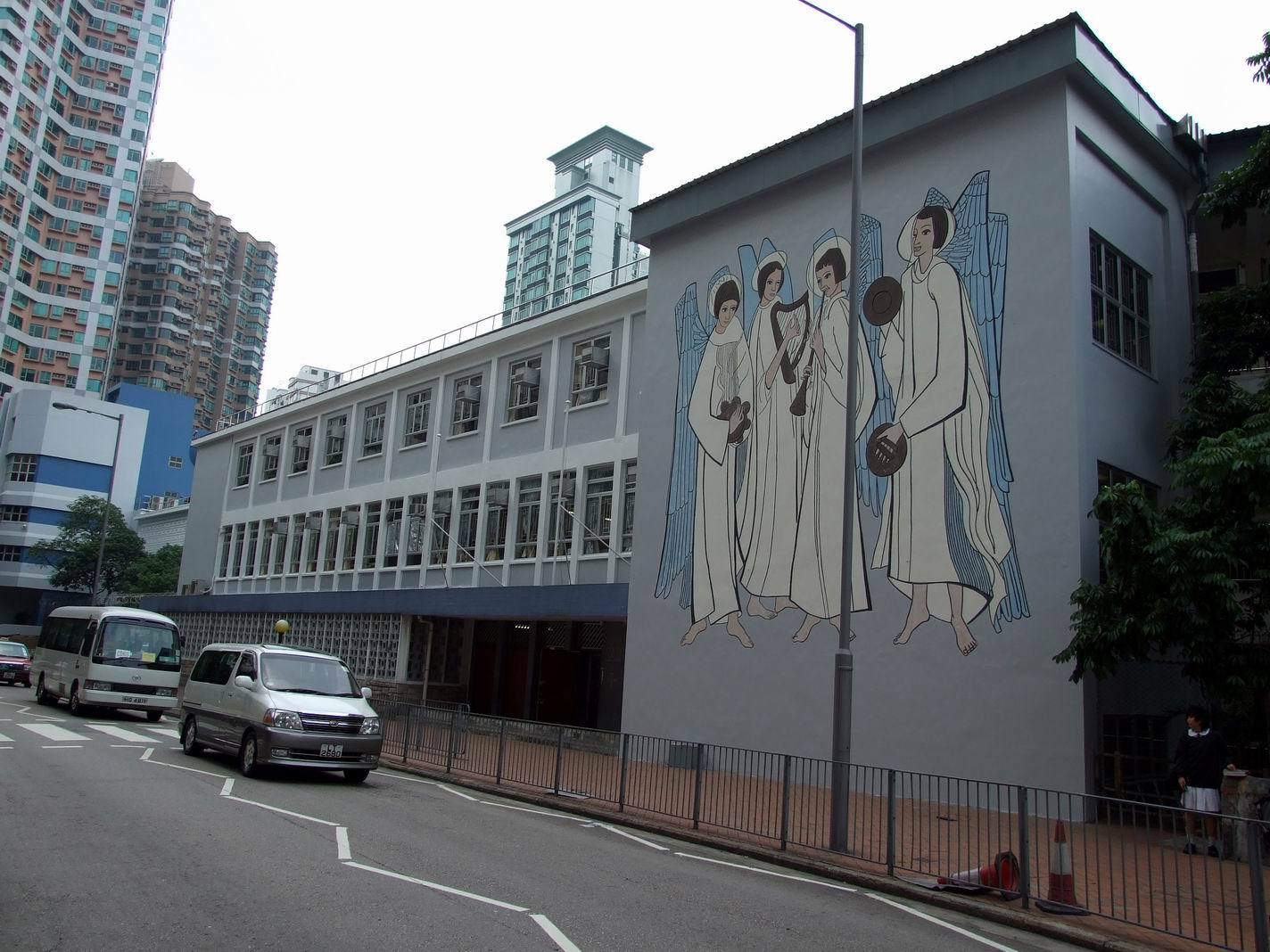
St. Francis' Canossian College along Kennedy Road

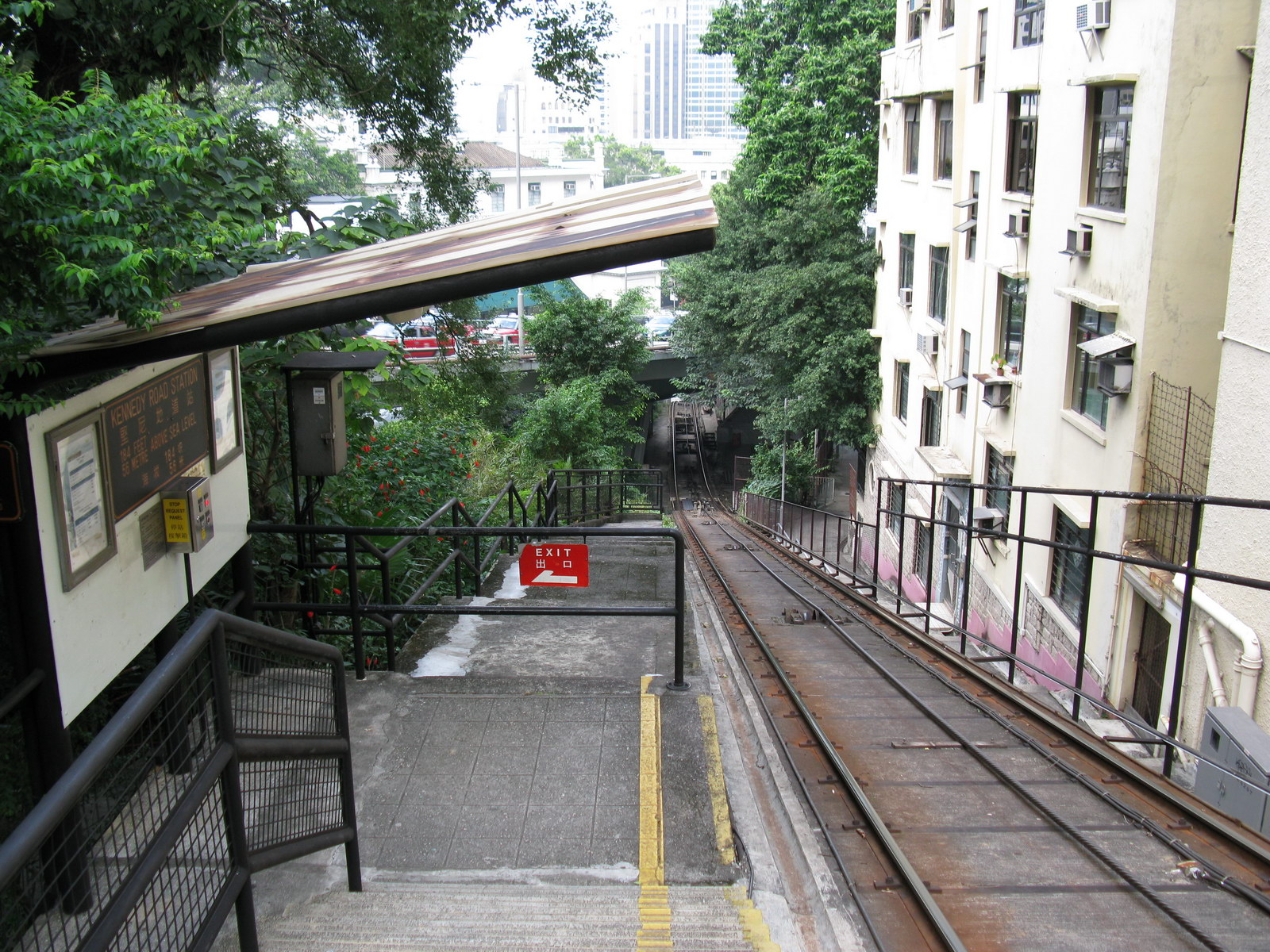
Kennedy Road stop of the Peak Tram

Kennedy Road (Chinese: 堅尼地道; Jyutping: gin1 nei4 dei6 dou6) is a road in the Mid-Levels on Hong Kong Island, Hong Kong. It is named after Arthur Kennedy, the seventh governor of Hong Kong.

== History ==
At the time of construction in 1876, it was the second major east–west route from the sea, in the local area. Thus being nicknamed second road.

== Location ==
Starting from Garden Road in the west, it goes past St. Joseph's College, Hong Kong Visual Arts Centre, Hong Kong Park and Hopewell Centre and ends at the junction with Queen's Road East near Morrison Hill in Wan Chai.

== Features ==
- No. 1: Zetland Hall Masonic Lodge
- No. 6: a Grade II Historic Building
- No. 7: St. Joseph's College. The North and West Blocks are declared monuments
- No. 7A: Hong Kong Visual Arts Centre, housed in the former Cassels Block, former barracks for married British officers, of Victoria Barracks. (a Grade I Historic Building)
- No. 8: a Grade II Historic Building
- Nos. 10, 12, 14, 16, 18 and 20. Row of shops under ramp
- No. 9–13: St. Francis' Canossian College
- No. 15: Hopewell Hotel
- No. 17: Hopewell Centre. Back entrance on the 17th floor
- No. 22A: Union Church
- No. 25–27: Hong Kong Tang King Po College
- No. 26: St. Joseph's College (an extension of the campus) (a Grade I Historic Building)
- No. 28: Office of Former Chief Executives (a Grade I Historic Building)
- No. 39: Phoenix Court
- No. 42: Office of the Commissioner of the Ministry of Foreign Affairs of China in Hong Kong
- No. 42A: Jockey Club New Life Hostel, housed in the former Roberts Block of Victoria Barracks (a Grade I Historic Building)
- No. 42B: Mother's Choice Limited, housed in the former Montgomery Block of Victoria Barracks (a Grade I Historic Building)
- No. 44: Hongkong Electric Centre
- No. 64: a Grade III Historic Building
- No. 84: Bamboo Grove
- No. 90: Merry Garden
- No. 100: St. James' Settlement
- No. 110: S.K.H. St. James' Primary School
- No. 128-130: Grandview Tower

== Public transportation ==
The Kennedy Road station of the Peak Tram is located on Kennedy Road.

Other forms of public transportation near or in Kennedy Road include:

- Mass Transit Railway (MTR) located in Wan Chai which is at the end of the junction
- Public light bus (also known as the mini bus) including Green Mini Bus Route 28 which runs through Caine Road, Nethersol Hospital, University of Hong Kong, Queen Mary Hospital, and Pok Fu Lam
- Tram Located on Johnston Road next to MTR exit A3

== See also ==
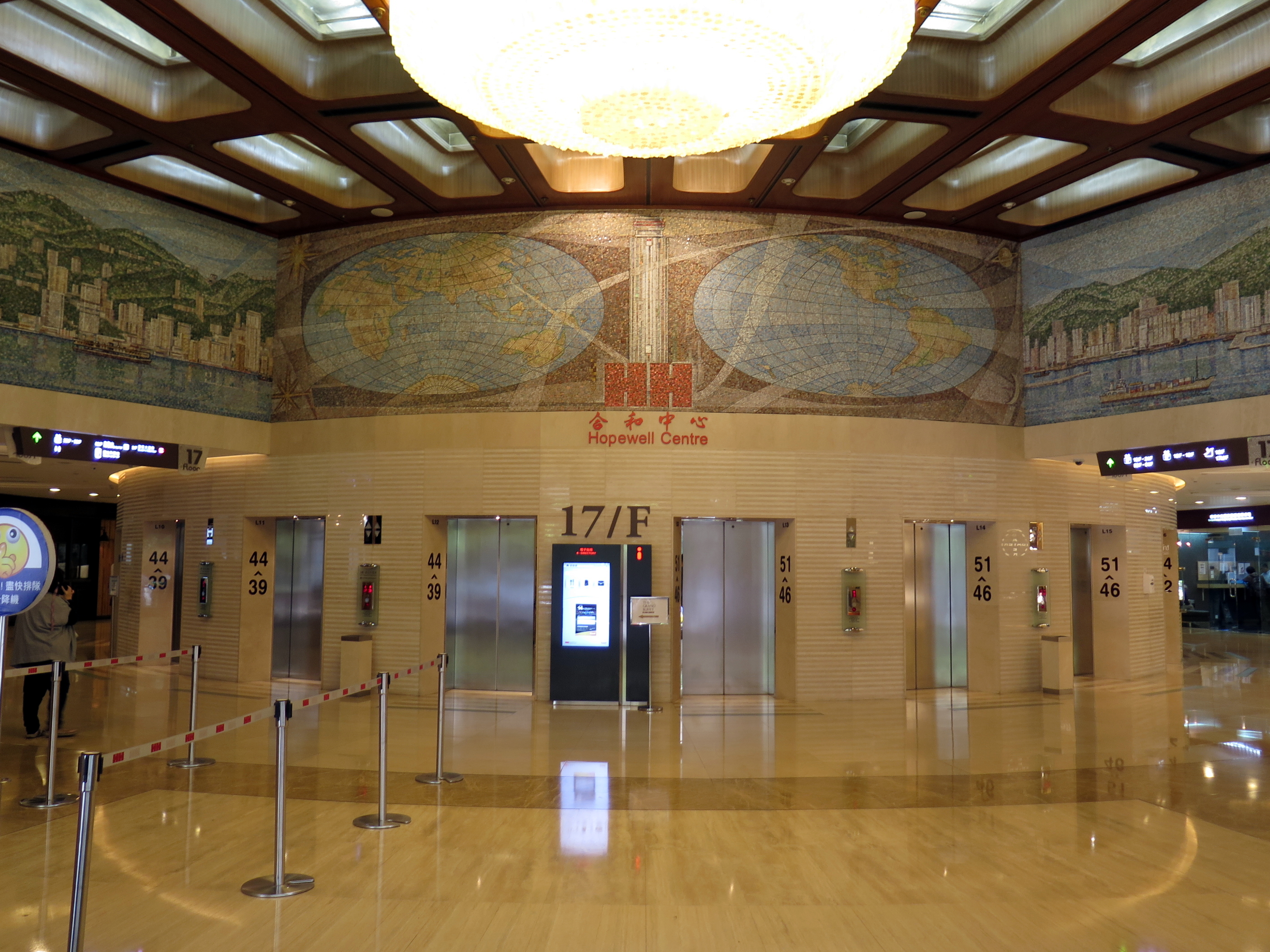
- The entrance to the Hopewell Centre on Kennedy Road.
  Mount Parish
- Central and Western Heritage Trail
- List of streets and roads in Hong Kong
