= Garden Road, Hong Kong =

Road on Hong Kong Island, Hong Kong

Coordinates: 22°16′41″N 114°09′34″E

Garden Road
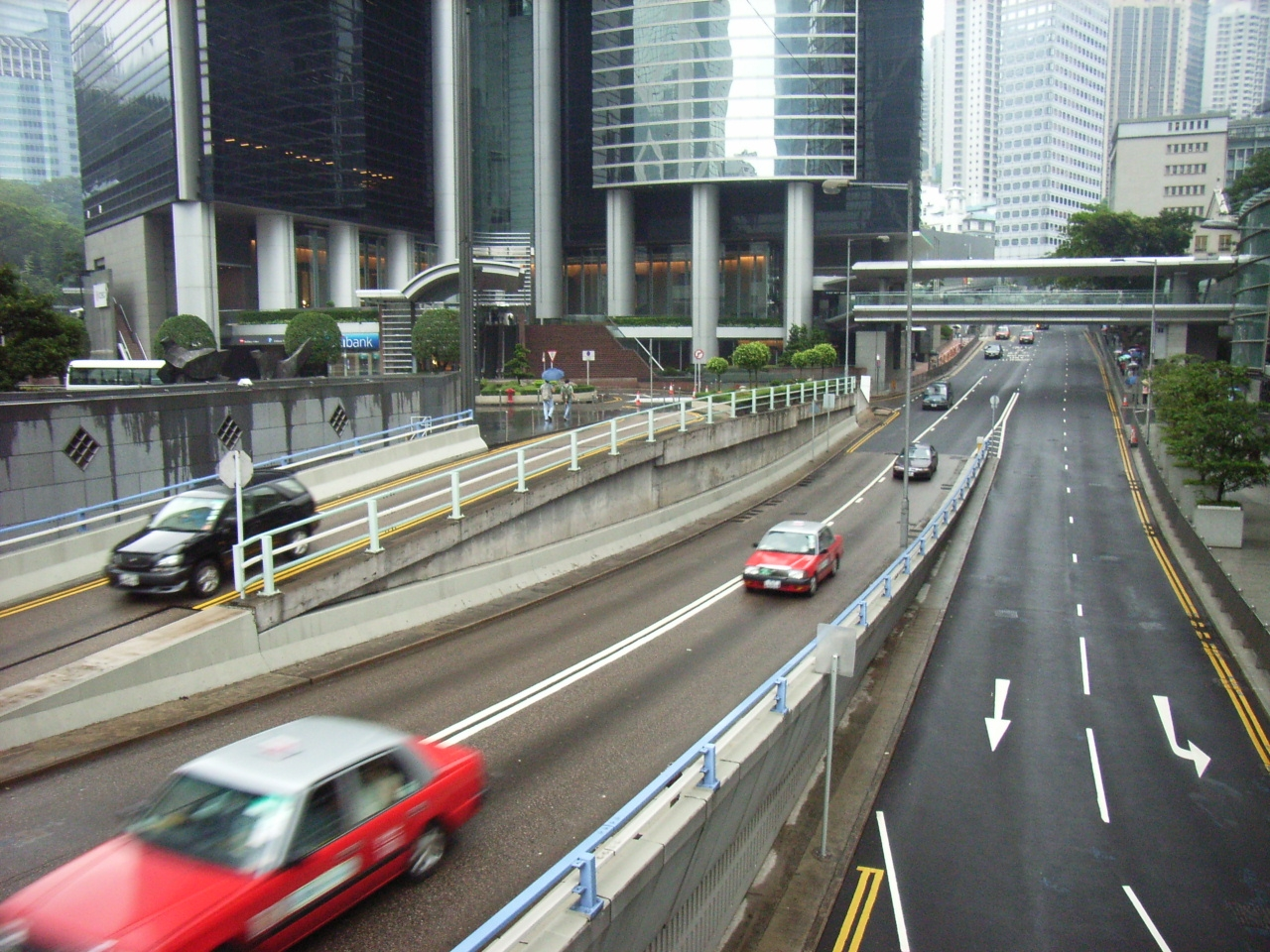
- Garden Road, looking uphill from the flyover at the intersection with Queensway
- Interactive map of Garden Road
- Native name: 花園道 (Yue Chinese)
- Length: 0.9 kilometres (0.56 mi)
- Location: Mid-Levels, Hong Kong
- Northeast end: Queensway / Cotton Tree Drive
- Southwest end: Robinson Road / Magazine Road

Garden Road
- Traditional Chinese: 花園道
- Simplified Chinese: 花园道
Transcriptions
Standard Mandarin
- Hanyu Pinyin: Huāyuán Dào
Yue: Cantonese
- Yale Romanization: fa1 yun4 dou6
- Jyutping: faa1 jyun4 dou6

Garden Road (Chinese: 花園道) is a major road on Hong Kong Island, Hong Kong, connecting the Central and Mid-Levels areas. It was formerly known as Albany Nullah.

At its lower (Central) end, Garden Road forms a grade-separated intersection with Queensway. For most of its length, Garden Road carries traffic only in the downhill direction. Uphill traffic is carried by Cotton Tree Drive, parallel to and to the east of Garden Road. Cotton Tree Drive merges with Garden Road just above the intersection with Upper Albert Road, and Garden Road continues uphill to an intersection with Robinson Road and Magazine Gap Road in the Mid-Levels.

Garden Road is rich in historical and heritage value. The Bank of China Tower, Three Garden Road, St. John's Cathedral, St. John's Building, the Helena May main building, the lower terminus of the Peak Tram, the United States Consulate-General, and the Hong Kong Zoological and Botanical Gardens all lie on the road.

In November 1841, the land between Garden and Glenealy Road was set aside for crown use and the area subsequently became known as Government Hill.

== See also ==
- List of streets and roads in Hong Kong
