= List of Grade III historic buildings in Hong Kong =

List of buildings of medium historical significance in Hong Kong

Grade III historic buildings (Chinese: 香港三級歷史建築列表) are those selected by Hong Kong's Antiquities and Monuments Office as those buildings which are "Buildings of some merit, but not yet qualified for consideration as possible monuments. These are to be recorded and used as a pool for future selection."

Note: This list is accurate as of 6 November 2009. A territory-wide grade reassessment has been ongoing since. See this link for the latest grading update.

== Central and Western District ==
ID	Name	Location	Coordinates	Notes/References	Photographs
H0734	Elliot Pumping Station & Filters Workmen's Quarters	Pok Fu Lam Road, Kennedy Town			Upload another image
H0754	Elliot Pumping Station & Filters, Treatment Works Building	Pok Fu Lam Road, Kennedy Town			Upload another image
H0316	London Mission Building	Nos. 78-80 Robinson Road, Mid-levels		Now a private clubhouse.	Upload another image
H0183	Main Block, Tung Wah Hospital	No. 12 Po Yan Street, Sheung Wan			Upload another image
H0510	Matilda and War Memorial Hospital	No. 41 Mount Kellet Road, The Peak			Upload another image
H0019	No.28 Kennedy Road (Office of Former Chief Executives)	No. 28 Kennedy Road, Central			Upload another image
H0693	Old Victoria Hospital Maternity Block	No. 17 Barker Road, The Peak			Upload another image
H0752	Peak Police Station	No. 92 Peak Road, The Peak			Upload Photo
H0528	St. Louis School	No. 179 Third Street, Sai Ying Pun			Upload another image
H0885	Stone House	No. 15 Kotewall Road, Mid-levels		Now a private residence.	Upload another image
H0092	Tsung Tsin Mission of Hong Kong Kau Yan Church	No. 97A High Street, Sai Ying Pun		Built in 1932. Designed by Palmer & Turner Architects.	Upload another image
H0564	West Point Filters Workmen's Quarters	No. 50 Kotewall Road, Mid-levels		Now part of the Lung Fu Shan Environmental Education Centre.	Upload another image
H0566	West Point Filters Workmen's Quarters	No. 50 Kotewall Road, Mid-levels		Now part of the Lung Fu Shan Environmental Education Centre.	Upload another image
H0561	Ex-Western Fire Station	No. 12 Belcher's Street, Kennedy Town		Converted into the Po Leung Kuk Chan Au Big Yan Home for the Elderly.	Upload another image
H0132	Old Tsan Yuk Maternity Hospital, Main Block.	No. 36A Western Street, Sai Ying Pun		Named "Western District Community Centre" since 1973.	Upload another image
H0498	Old Tsan Yuk Maternity Hospital, Annex Block.	No. 36A Western Street, Sai Ying Pun			Upload another image
H0581	Old Upper Levels Police Station	No. 1F High Street, Sai Ying Pun		Now used as the Crime Hong Kong Island Regional Headquarters.	Upload another image
H0599	Central Market	No. 80 Des Voeux Road, Central			Upload another image

== Eastern District ==
ID	Name	Location	Coordinates	Notes/References	Photographs
H0829	Former Quarry Bay School	No. 986 King's Road, Quarry Bay			Upload another image
H0227	Lyemun Barracks Block 17	Lei Yue Mun, Chai Wan			Upload another image
H0371	Lyemun Barracks Block 03	Lei Yue Mun, Chai Wan			Upload another image
H0375	Lyemun Barracks Block 05	Lei Yue Mun, Chai Wan			Upload another image
H0113	Lyemun Barracks Block 20	Lei Yue Mun, Chai Wan			Upload another image
H0093	Lyemun Barracks Block 30	Lei Yue Mun, Chai Wan			Upload another image
H0165	Lyemun Barracks Block 31	Lei Yue Mun, Chai Wan			Upload another image
H0201	Lyemun Barracks Block 32	Lei Yue Mun, Chai Wan			Upload another image
H0288	Lyemun Barracks Block 33	Lei Yue Mun, Chai Wan			Upload another image
H0354	Lyemun Barracks Block 34	Lei Yue Mun, Chai Wan			Upload another image

== Islands District ==
ID	Name	Location	Coordinates	Notes/References	Photographs
H0593	Cheung Chau Fong Bin Hospital	Cheung Chau			Upload another image
H0536	Cheung Chau Government Secondary School	No. 5B School Road, Cheung Chau			Upload another image
H0372	Cheung Chau Police Station	No. 4 Police Station Path, Cheung Chau 22.208184°N 114.030602°E			Upload another image
H0440	Old Tai O Police Station	Shek Tsai Po Street, Tai O, Lantau Island			Upload another image
H1272	Shui Yuet Temple	Kwun Yam Wan, Cheung Chau	22°12′23″N 114°02′05″E		Upload another image
H1117	Tin Hau Temple	Fan Lau Miu Wan, Fan Lau, Lantau Island			Upload another image
H0912	Tin Hau Temple	Sai Wan, Cheung Chau			Upload another image

== Kowloon City District ==
ID	Name	Location	Coordinates	Notes/References	Photographs
H0410	Diocesan Boys' School	No. 131 Argyle Street, Mong Kok			Upload another image
H0609	Heep Yunn School	No. 1 Farm Road, Ho Man Tin			Upload another image
H0231	Kowloon Hospital, Block A	No. 147A Argyle Street, Mong Kok			Upload another image
H0232	Kowloon Hospital, Block B	No. 147A Argyle Street, Mong Kok			Upload Photo
H0233	Kowloon Hospital, Block C	No. 147A Argyle Street, Mong Kok			Upload another image
H0234	Kowloon Hospital, Block M	No. 147A Argyle Street, Mong Kok			Upload another image
H0235	Kowloon Hospital, Block P	No. 147A Argyle Street, Mong Kok			Upload another image
H0236	Kowloon Hospital, Block R	No. 147A Argyle Street, Mong Kok			Upload another image
H0237	Kowloon Hospital, Isolation Block	No. 147A Argyle Street, Mong Kok			Upload Photo
H0238	Kowloon Hospital, Outpatient Block	No. 147A Argyle Street, Mong Kok			Upload another image
H0761	Kowloon Hospital, Utility Building	No. 147A Argyle Street, Mong Kok			Upload another image
H0811	Kowloon Hospital, Utility Building	No. 147A Argyle Street, Mong Kok			Upload another image
H1364	Pak Tai Temple	No. 146 Ma Tau Wai Road, Hung Hom			Upload another image
H0230	Ex-Ma Tau Kok Animal Quarantine Depot	No. 63 Ma Tau Kok Road, To Kwa Wan		Converted into the Cattle Depot Artist Village	Upload another image
H1081	Tin Hau Temple	No. 49 Ha Heung Road, To Kwa Wan			Upload another image

== Kwun Tong District ==
ID	Name	Location	Coordinates	Notes/References	Photographs

== North District ==
ID	Name	Location	Coordinates	Notes/References	Photographs
H0989	Bok Man School	Tsung Pak Long Village, Sheung Shui			Upload another image
H0960	Hung Leng Station	Fanling-Sha Tau Kok Branch Line, Sha Tau Kok Road, Hung Leng			Upload another image
H0604	Manor House	Kwu Tung, Sheung Shui			Upload Photo
H0312	Lady Ho Tung Welfare Centre	No. 38 Kwu Tung, Sheung Shui			Upload another image
H0424	Old Sheung Shui Police Station	Sheung Shui Heung, Sheung Shui 22.508248°N 114.125432°E			Upload another image
H0929	Tsung Kyam Church or Shung Him Church	No. 20 Shung Him Tong Tsuen, Lung Yeuk Tau, Fanling			Upload another image
H0802	Sin Wai Nunnery	Ho Sheung Heung, Sheung Shui			Upload another image
H0724	Ta Kwu Ling Police Station	Ping Che Road, Ta Kwu Ling			Upload another image

== Sai Kung District ==
ID	Name	Location	Coordinates	Notes/References	Photographs
H0392	Hong Kong Adventist College & Hong Kong Adventist Academy	No. 1111 Clear Water Bay Road, Sheung Yeung			Upload another image
H1054	Hung Shing Temple	Po Toi O			Upload another image
H1401	Hung Shing Temple	Tung Lung Island			Upload another image
H0398	Tin Hau Temple and Hip Tin Temple	Po Tung Road			Upload another image
H0688	Immaculate Conception Chapel	Tai Long			Upload another image
H0368	St. Joseph's Chapel	Yim Tin Tsai		Completed in 1890.	Upload another image

== Sha Tin District ==
ID	Name	Location	Coordinates	Notes/References	Photographs
H0563	High Rock Christian Camp	No. 102 Sha Tin Tau Village 22.374062°N 114.187841°E			Upload another image
H0580	Lam Ancestral Hall	Nos.8, 10-14 Pai Tau			Upload another image
H0990	Man Fat Tsz Main Temple Building	Pai Tau Hang		Ten Thousand Buddhas Monastery	Upload another image
H0991	Man Fat Tsz Pagoda	Pai Tau Hang			Upload another image
H0439	Shek Lei Pui Treatment Works - Two connected Treatment Works Buildings	Kam Shan Country Park			Upload Photo
H0487	Shek Lei Pui Treatment Works - Chemical House	Kam Shan Country Park			Upload Photo

== Sham Shui Po District ==
ID	Name	Location	Coordinates	Notes/References	Photographs
H0331	Some buildings/military facilities within the Ngong Shuen Chau Barracks	Stonecutters Island		Some buildings/facilities also Grade I and II	Upload Photo
H0845	Lai Chi Kok Hospital	No. 800 Castle Peak Road, Lai Chi Kok			Upload another image
H0308	Sham Shui Po Police Station	No. 37A Yen Chow Street, Sham Shui Po			Upload another image
H0572	Sham Shui Po Public Dispensary	No. 137 Yee Kuk Street, Sham Shui Po	22°19′36″N 114°09′42″E	Now used as a Public Dispensary and Methadone Clinic	Upload another image
H0864	Tin Hau Temple	No.180-184 Yee Kuk Street, Sham Shui Po			Upload another image

== Southern District ==
ID	Name	Location	Coordinates	Notes/References	Photographs
H0553	Aberdeen Reservoir, Lower Reservoir, Pump House	Aberdeen Reservoir Road, Aberdeen			Upload another image
H0290	Aberdeen Reservoir, Lower Reservoir, Valve House	Aberdeen Reservoir Road, Aberdeen			Upload Photo
H0735	Aberdeen Reservoir, Lower Reservoir, Aberdeen Management Centre	Aberdeen Reservoir Road, Aberdeen			Upload Photo
H0746	Aberdeen Reservoir, Lower Reservoir, Chemical House and Air Vents	Aberdeen Reservoir Road, Aberdeen			Upload another image
H0740	Aberdeen Technical School	No. 1 Wong Chuk Hang Road, Aberdeen			Upload another image
H0306	Former Wong Nai Chung Reservoir Workmen's Quarters	Tai Tam Reservoir Road, Wong Nai Chung			Upload another image
H0769	Magazine Building	Magazine Island, Pok Fu Lam			Upload another image
H0484	Old Aberdeen Police Station, Main Building	No. 116 Aberdeen Main Road, Aberdeen		It now houses the Warehouse Teenage Club	Upload another image
H0485	Old Aberdeen Police Station, Annex	No. 116 Aberdeen Main Road, Aberdeen			Upload another image
H0486	Old Aberdeen Police Station, Annex	No. 116 Aberdeen Main Road, Aberdeen			Upload another image
H0698	Red-Brick Building, Tai Tam Reservoir	Near the Tai Tam Byewash Reservoir, off Tai Tam Road			Upload another image
H0807	St. Stephen's College Preparatory School	Nos. 30-32 Wong Ma Kok Road, Stanley			Upload Photo
H0343	Stanley Fort, Stanley Fort Block 22	Stanley Peninsula, Stanley			Upload Photo
H0347	Stanley Fort, Stanley Fort Block 26	Stanley Peninsula, Stanley			Upload Photo
H0345	Stanley Fort, Stanley Fort Block 24	Stanley Peninsula, Stanley			Upload Photo
H0324	Stanley Fort, Stanley Fort Block 10	Stanley Peninsula, Stanley			Upload Photo
H0326	Stanley Fort, Stanley Fort Block 13	Stanley Peninsula, Stanley			Upload Photo
H0634	Stanley Fort, Stanley Battery, Second CASL	Stanley Peninsula, Stanley			Upload Photo
H0342	Stanley Fort, Stanley Fort Block 21	Stanley Peninsula, Stanley			Upload Photo
H0328	Stanley Fort, Stanley Fort Block 15	Stanley Peninsula, Stanley			Upload Photo
H0346	Stanley Fort, Stanley Fort Block 25	Stanley Peninsula, Stanley			Upload Photo
H0344	Stanley Fort, Stanley Fort Block 23	Stanley Peninsula, Stanley			Upload Photo
H0632	Stanley Fort, Stanley Fort Block 03	Stanley Peninsula, Stanley			Upload Photo
H0327	Stanley Fort, Stanley Fort Block 14	Stanley Peninsula, Stanley			Upload Photo
H0348	Stanley Fort, Stanley Fort Block 27	Stanley Peninsula, Stanley			Upload Photo
H0525	Stanley Fort, Stanley Fort Underground bunker	Stanley Peninsula, Stanley			Upload Photo
H0633	Stanley Fort, Stanley Fort Block 04	Stanley Peninsula, Stanley			Upload Photo
H0325	Stanley Fort, Stanley Fort Block 12	Stanley Peninsula, Stanley			Upload Photo
H0682	Stanley Fort, Stanley Battery, Battery Observation Post	Stanley Peninsula, Stanley			Upload Photo
H0682A	Stanley Fort, Stanley Battery, SCP	Stanley Peninsula, Stanley			Upload Photo
H0330	Stanley Fort, Stanley Fort Block 20	Stanley Peninsula, Stanley			Upload Photo
H0339	Stanley Fort, Stanley Fort Block 01	Stanley Peninsula, Stanley			Upload Photo
H0388	Stanley Fort, Stanley Battery, Block 44	Stanley Peninsula, Stanley			Upload Photo
H0389	Stanley Fort, Stanley Battery, Block 44B	Stanley Peninsula, Stanley			Upload Photo
H0390	Stanley Fort, Stanley Battery, Block 45	Stanley Peninsula, Stanley			Upload Photo
H0635	Stanley Fort, Stanley Battery, First CASL	Stanley Peninsula, Stanley			Upload Photo
H0329	Stanley Fort, Stanley Fort Block 18	Stanley Peninsula, Stanley			Upload Photo
H1067	Stanley Public Dispensary	No. 14 Wong Ma Kok Road, Stanley			Upload another image
H1215	Tin Hau Temple	No. 333 Shek O Village, Shek O			Upload another image
H0404	Residence of Financial Secretary	No. 45 Shouson Hill Road, Wong Chuk Hang			Upload another image
H1038	Shui Yuet Temple	No. 181 Main Street, Ap Lei Chau		Dedicated to Guan Yin	Upload another image
H1206	Tai Tam Byewash Reservoir, Ruins of a Senior Staff Bungalow	Tai Tam Reservoir, Tai Tam			Upload Photo
H0738	Tai Tam Byewash Reservoir, Workmen's Quarters	Tai Tam Reservoir, Tai Tam			Upload Photo
H0583	The Building at 128 Pok Fu Lam Road (Jessville)	128 Pok Fu Lam Road		The declaration of the Building as a Proposed Monument was withdrawn on February 1, 2008	Upload another image

== Tai Po District ==
ID	Name	Location	Coordinates	Notes/References	Photographs
H1358	Kwun Yum Temple	Ta Tit Yan			Upload Photo
H1240	Pun Chun Yuen Tai Hung Po Din	No. 17 Shek Lin Road, Kam Shan			Upload another image
H1319	Pun Chun Yuen Tak Wai Tong	No. 17 Shek Lin Road, Kam Shan			Upload another image
H1296	Pun Chun Yuen Glass House	No. 17 Shek Lin Road, Kam Shan			Upload another image
H1022	Tin Hau Temple	Sha Tau, Ping Chau (Tung Ping Chau)			Upload another image
H1035	Tin Hau Temple Complex Shui Yuet Kung	Ha Wai, Tap Mun Chau			Upload another image

== Tsuen Wan District ==
ID	Name	Location	Coordinates	Notes/References	Photographs
H0560	Chuk Lam Sim Yuen	Fu Yung Shan, Tsuen Wan		"Bamboo Forest Monastery", built between 1929 and 1932.	Upload another image
H0966	Old House of the Former Hoi Pa Tsuen (Formerly Lot 956 of Hoi Pa Tsuen)	Jockey Club Tak Wah Park, Tak Wah Street			Upload another image
H1190	Po Kwong Yuen Monastery	Lo Wai Road			Upload Photo
H1369	Tin Hau Temple	Nos. 56-58 Castle Peak Road, Tsing Lung Tau			Upload another image
H0895	Chan Yi Cheung Ancestral Hall	Jockey Club Tak Wah Park, Tak Wah Street			Upload another image
H1115	Tin Hau Temple	No. 38 Ma Wan Town, Ma Wan			Upload another image

== Tuen Mun District ==
ID	Name	Location	Coordinates	Notes/References	Photographs
H0739	Ching Leung Fat Yuen	Ching Yan Siu Chuk, 21.5 Milestone, Fu Tei			Upload Photo
H0755	Ching Leung Fat Yuen Fat Din	21.5 Milestone, Fu Tei			Upload another image
H1052	Lau Ancestral Hall	Tuk Mei Chung, Lung Kwu Tan			Upload Photo
H0713	No.3 San Shek Wan North Road, (Formerly name as No.17 Yeung Tsing Road)	No. 3 San Shek Wan North Road			Upload Photo
H1354	Sam Shing Temple	Tuen Tsz Wai, Lam Tei			Upload another image
H1353	Sin Hing Tung	Tuen Fat Road			Upload another image
H1363	Tin Hau Temple	Tai Lam Kok			Upload another image

== Wan Chai District ==
ID	Name	Location	Coordinates	Notes/References	Photographs
H0597	No.64 Kennedy Road	No.64 Kennedy Road, Wan Chai			Upload another image
H0433	Tung Wah Eastern Hospital	No. 19 Eastern Hospital Road, Causeway Bay			Upload another image
H0590	Wan Chai Market	No. 264 Queen's Road East, Wan Chai			Upload another image
H0356	Wan Chai Police Station	No. 123 Gloucester Road, Wan Chai			Upload another image
H0534	Sikh Temple	No. 371 Queen's Road East, Wan Chai, at the junction with Stubbs Road			Upload another image
H0521	The Church of Christ in China Shing Kwong Church	No. 7 Eastern Hospital Road, Causeway Bay			Upload another image

== Wong Tai Sin District ==
ID	Name	Location	Coordinates	Notes/References	Photographs
H1134	Former Royal Airforce [sic] Hangar	Tai Hom Village, Diamond Hill			Upload another image
H1322	Stone House	No. 4 Tai Koon Yuen, Tai Hom Village, Diamond Hill			Upload another image

== Yau Tsim Mong District ==
ID	Name	Location	Coordinates	Notes/References	Photographs
H0986	Hung Shing Temple	Fuk Tsun Street, Tai Kok Tsui			Upload another image
H0289	Old Kowloon Police Headquarters	No. 142 Prince Edward Road West, Mong Kok		Now part of the Mong Kok Police Station	Upload another image
H0054	Some buildings within the Gun Club Hill	Gun Club Hill, Austin Road, Tsim Sha Tsui		Some buildings also Grade II	Upload another image
H0051	Whitfield Barracks, Block 58	Kowloon Park, Tsim Sha Tsui		Located along Haiphong Road, east of Kowloon Park Drive. Used as a godown of Hong Kong Museum of History.	Upload another image
H0048	Whitfield Barracks, Block S4	Kowloon Park, Tsim Sha Tsui		Now houses the Health Education Exhibition and Resource Centre	Upload another image
H0043	Whitfield Barracks, Blocks S61 & S62	Kowloon Park, Tsim Sha Tsui		Blocks S61 and S62 now house the Hong Kong Heritage Discovery Centre	Upload another image
H0941	All Saints' Church	No. 2 Yim Po Fong Street, Mong Kok			Upload another image
H0184	Kowloon Union Church	No. 4 Jordan Road, Yau Ma Tei			Upload another image
H0360	Old Kowloon Fire Station, Main Block	No. 33 Salisbury Road, Tsim Sha Tsui			Upload another image
H0359	Old Kowloon Fire Station, Accommodation Block	No. 33 Salisbury Road, Tsim Sha Tsui			Upload another image
H1084	Shui Yuet Temple	No. 90 Shan Tung Street, Mongkok		Dedicated to Guan Yin	Upload another image
H0320	Yau Ma Tei Police Station	No. 627 Canton Road, Yau Ma Tei			Upload another image
H0271	Yau Ma Tei Wholesale Fruit Market	Shek Lung Street, Yau Ma Tei			Upload another image

== Yuen Long District ==
ID	Name	Location	Coordinates	Notes/References	Photographs
H0223	Chou Wong Yi Kung Study Hall	Shui Tau Tsuen, Kam Tin			Upload another image
H0548	Lai Mansion	No. 485 Lai Uk Tsuen, Pat Heung			Upload another image
H1355	Ming Tak Tong Ancestral Hall	Fan Tin Tsuen, San Tin			Upload Photo
H1004	So Lau Yuen	No. 25 Shui Tau, Pak Wai Tsuen, Kam Tin			Upload another image
H0775	Tang Lung Yau Wan Tsuen Um Ancestral Hall	No.57 Tsz Tong Tsuen, Kam Tin			Upload another image
H0883	Tin Hau Temple	No.62 Shui Mei Tsuen, Kam Tin			Upload another image
H0519	Tung Yik School	No. 199 Lin Fa Tei, Pat Heung			Upload another image
H1382	Yau Sin Study Hall	San Wai, Ha Tsuen			Upload Photo
H1028	Yeuk Hui Study Hall	Hang Mei Tsuen, Ping Shan			Upload another image
H1108	Cheng Ancestral Hall	No. 120 Ngau Keng, Pat Heung			Upload another image
H1034	Cheung Ancestral Hall	No.74 Shui Tsan Tin, Pat Heung			Upload Photo
H1438	Choi Kei Tung Ancestral Hall	Shek Wu Tong, Pat Heung			Upload Photo
H1065	Chung Shing Temple	No.136 Yuen Kong Tsuen, Pat Heung			Upload another image
H0850	Kong Ha Wai	Near Kam Tsin Wai, Pat Heung			Upload another image
H1366	Kwok Ancestral Hall	Lin Fa Tei, Pat Heung			Upload Photo
H0954	Lai Ancestral Hall	No. 146 Tsz Tong Tsuen, Sheung Tsuen, Pat Heung			Upload Photo
H1034A	Lee Ancestral Hall	No.77 Shui Tsan Tin, Pat Heung			Upload Photo
H1155	Lee Ancestral Hall	No.63 Ngau Keng, Pat Heung			Upload Photo
H1080	Ling Wan Monastery	Kwun Yum Shan, Pat Heung			Upload another image
H0496	Lok Ma Chau Police Station	No. 100 Lok Ma Chau Road, Lok Ma Chau 22.511544°N 114.080218°E			Upload another image
H0781	Miu Kok Yuen	No. 136 Fung Kat Heung			Upload another image
H0373	Old Ping Shan Police Station	Ping Shan 22.445454°N 114.010252°E		Now used as the Ping Shan Tang Clan Gallery cum Heritage Trail Visitors Centre.	Upload another image
H0924	Yeung Hau Temple	Sheung Cheung Wai, Ping Shan			Upload another image
H1045	Yeung Hau Temple	Tong Yan San Tsuen, Ping Shan			Upload Photo

== See also ==
- List of buildings and structures in Hong Kong
- Heritage conservation in Hong Kong
- Declared monuments of Hong Kong
- List of Grade I historic buildings in Hong Kong
- List of Grade II historic buildings in Hong Kong
- Heritage Trails in Hong Kong
- History of Hong Kong
