= One Tree Island =

One Tree Island may refer to:

- Pulau Satumu in Singapore
- Magazine Island in Hong Kong
- One Tree Island (Queensland), in Australia
