= Wa Shan Tsuen =

Village in Sheung Shui, Hong Kong

Coordinates: 22.516582°N 114.1338724°E

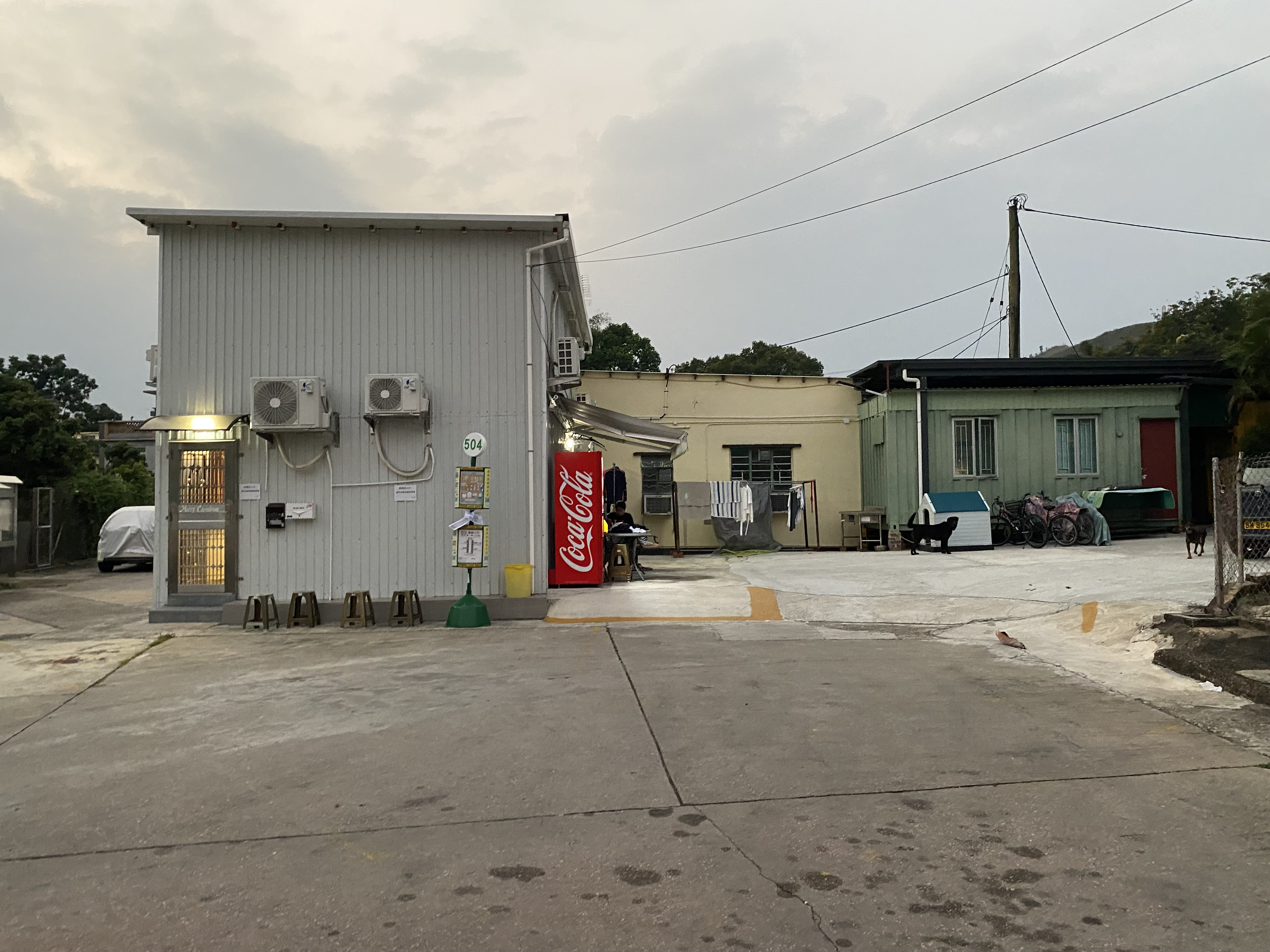
Wa Shan Tsuen minibus terminus

Wa Shan Tsuen (Chinese: 華山村) is a village in Sheung Shui, North District, Hong Kong near the Ng Tung River.

== Administration ==
Wa Shan is a recognized village under the New Territories Small House Policy. Wa Shan Tsuen is one of the villages represented within the Sheung Shui District Rural Committee. For electoral purposes, Wa Shan Tsuen is part of the Fung Tsui constituency, which was formerly represented by Chiang Man-ching until July 2021.
