= Jessville =

Mansion in Hong Kong

Coordinates: 22.267444°N 114.133307°E

- 譚雅士大宅
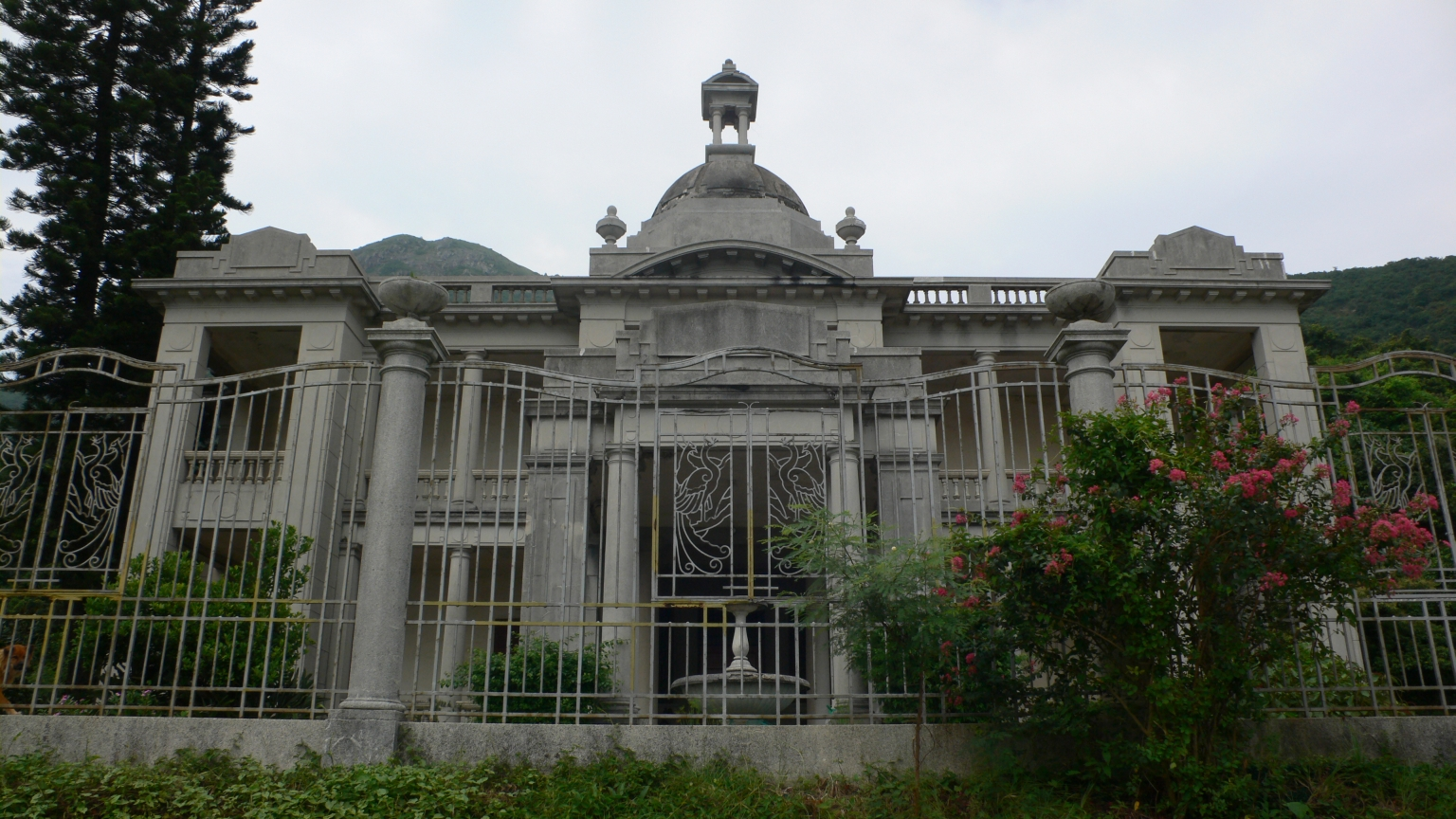
- Jessville
- Interactive map of the Jessville area

General information
- Architectural style: Renaissance
- Location: Pok Fu Lam, 128 Pok Fu Lam Road, Hong Kong
- Completed: 1929
- Client: William Ngartse Thomas Tam

Jessville
- Traditional Chinese: 譚雅士大宅
Transcriptions
Yue: Cantonese
- Yale Romanization: Tàahm ngáah sih daaih jaahk
- Jyutping: Taam4 ngaa5 si6 daai6 zaak6

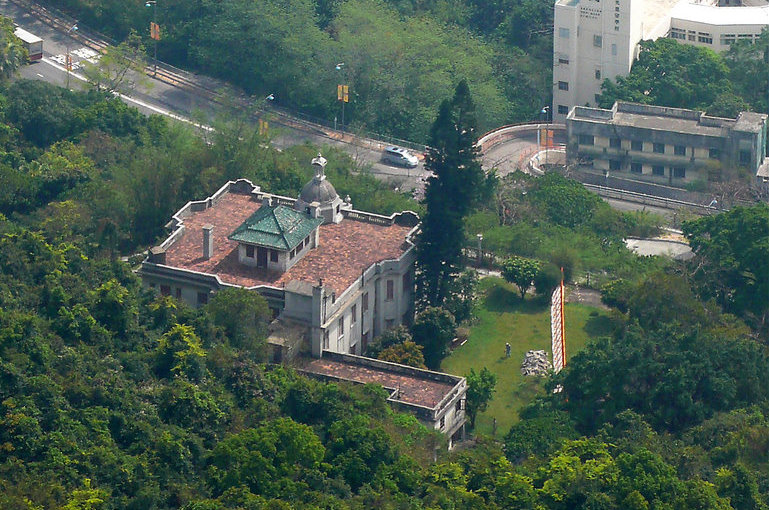
Jessville

Jessville is a mansion located at 128 Pok Fu Lam Road in Pok Fu Lam, Hong Kong. The building is built in the Italian Renaissance style.

== History ==
Jessville was built in 1929 by William Ngartse Thomas Tam, and named in honour of his wife, Jessie TO Pui-Chun.

== Conservation ==
Facing threat of demolition, Jessville was declared a "Proposed monument" in 2007. The declaration was later withdrawn and the building was listed as a Grade III historic building.
