= Ten Thousand Buddhas Monastery =

Buddhist temple in Hong Kong

- 萬佛寺 (Chinese)
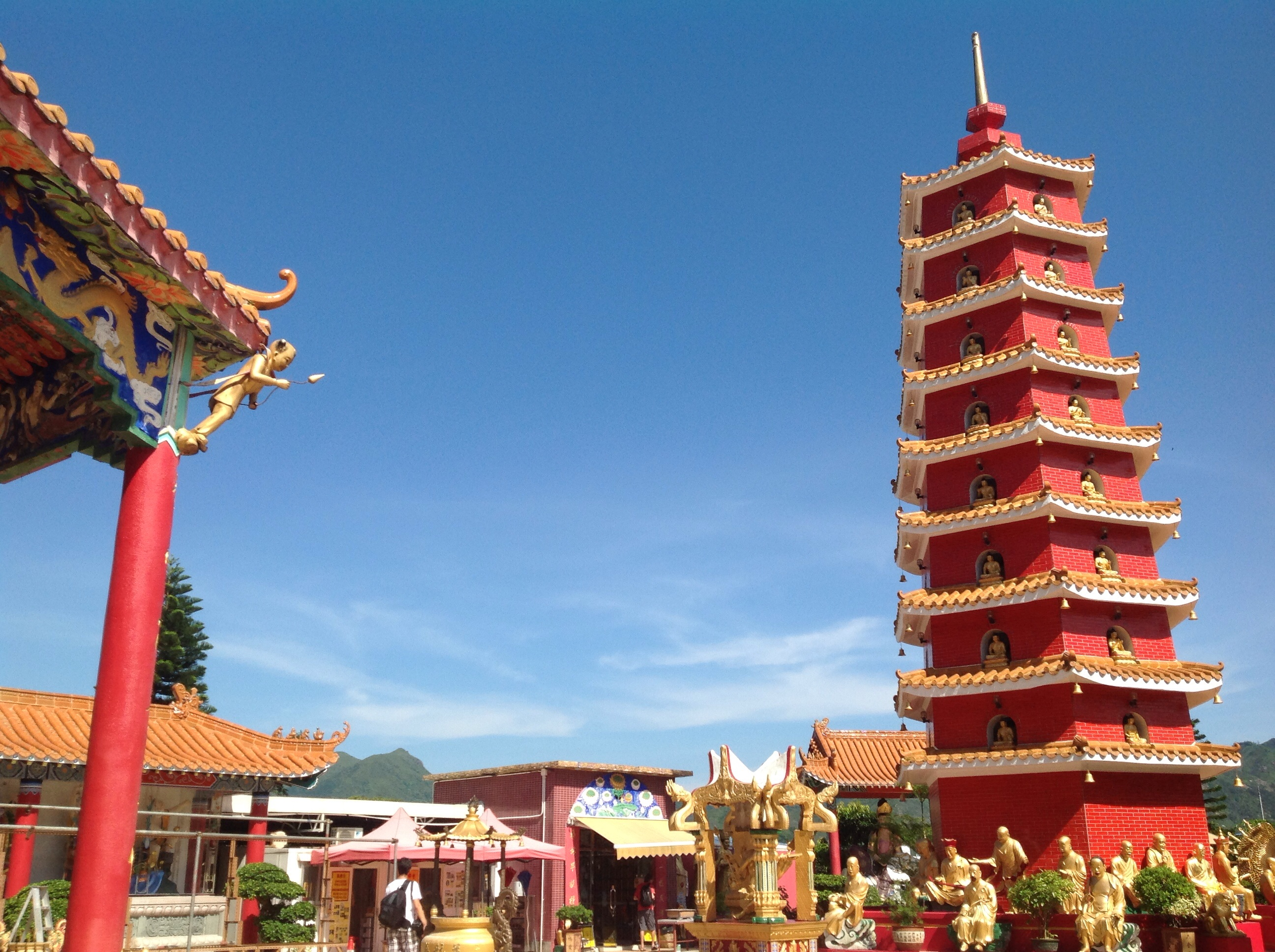
- View of the temple's pagoda

Religion
- Affiliation: Buddhism

Location
- Location: 220 Pai Tau Village, Sha Tin, New Territories, Hong Kong
- Country: China
- Interactive map of Ten Thousand Buddhas Monastery
- Coordinates: 22°23′15″N 114°11′05″E

Architecture
- Founder: Yuet Kai
- Completed: 1957; 69 years ago

The Ten Thousand Buddhas Monastery (Chinese: 萬佛寺; Cantonese Yale: maahn faht dzí; Jyutping: maan6 fat6 zi2; pinyin: wàn fó sì) is a mid-20th century Buddhist temple located in Sha Tin, Hong Kong, at 220 Pai Tau Village. Its designation as a monastery is actually a misnomer because there are no monks residing at the complex, which is managed solely by laypersons. Both the main temple building and the pagoda are listed as Grade III historic buildings by the Hong Kong Government.

Groundbreaking and construction of the temple began in 1949 under Yuet Kai and his followers, and the structure was finished eight years later. It closed for three years at the end of the 20th century after one of its caretakers was killed in a mudslide caused by poorly maintained slopes nearby. The main journey up to the monastery is an attraction itself, as the path is lined on both sides with golden Buddhas, each unique and in different poses. Despite the common translation of its name, (Note: The character 萬 can mean both "10,000" and "numerous".) the monastery actually contains nearly 13,000 Buddha statues.

== History ==
=== Beginnings (1949–1965) ===
The Monastery was founded in 1949 by the Venerable Yuet Kai (月溪法師), who moved to Hong Kong from mainland China almost two decades before in 1938 to proselytize the teachings of Buddhism. The site previously housed a temple to Kwun Yam where a nun was killed during World War II. After the land was purchased by the owner of a local tobacco company, he consequently donated it to Yuet Kai for the purpose of establishing a Buddhist college. This, however, did not come to fruition and the Monastery was built in its stead. Its foundation took place two years after the Communist victory on the Mainland. Yuet Kai and his followers carried out the building "by hand" and personally transported supplies from the base of the hill. This endeavour was funded through donations from the lay public; the construction of the Monastery was eventually completed in 1957, although the installation of Buddhist statues throughout the monastery complex continued into the new millennium.

Yuet Kai died in 1965, eight years after the Monastery first opened. An apocryphal story written by his followers claims that his body was found to be incorruptible eight months after his death, a result of the seated lotus position he was buried in. However, newspapers maintain that he was in fact embalmed; his intact body is exhibited in the main hall of the monastery.

=== After the founder's death (1965 onwards) ===
Unlike an actual monastery, the Ten Thousand Buddhas Monastery does not have any monks living on site; the complex is instead maintained by laypeople. After Yuet Kai's death, his nephews assumed the role of overseeing the maintenance of the building. It was at this time that the Monastery began to decline in popularity. This was partly owing to the disruption caused by the construction of the Sha Tin New Town during the 1970s. Renovations to the Monastery buildings were subsequently carried out in 1982, 1997 and 2005; the latest renovation was described by the Antiquities Advisory Board as having compromised the building's historic "authenticity".

=== Mudslide and temporary closure (1997–2000) ===
On 2 July 1997, a day after the handover of Hong Kong to China, a mudslide measuring more than 400 cubic metres (14,000 cu ft) struck around the site of the Monastery. It was caused by four days of heavy rainfall that was equivalent to almost half the city's average annual rainfall of 2.25 metres (7.4 ft). The slide buried the house of Ma Shuk-fong, the 73-year-old caretaker of the temple who had assumed the position exactly a year before. She was reported missing that same day, and though the Fire Services Department requested the Government Flying Service to dispatch a helicopter as part of the rescue bid, the plan was subsequently abandoned due to darkness. A helicopter carrying a small digger was deployed to the site the following day, but the area's challenging terrain – namely the unstable mud and the narrow path encompassing the Monastery – severely hindered rescue efforts. Ma's body was finally retrieved four days later. A coroner later ruled that her death by suffocation under the mud was accidental, but expressed unease over the condition of slopes and pushed for stricter laws to be implemented.

The Civil Engineering Department published two independent reports in March 1998 revealing that the upkeep of the hillside overlooking the monastery was inadequate. This was partially attributed to the government's method of cutting slopes. The incident resulted in the closure of the Monastery for three years to carry out repair work on the surrounding slopes in three stages. Each phase cost more than HK$1.5 million – this outlay was covered by donations from the public, since the Monastery does not charge an admission fee for visitors. The lay custodians eventually requested HK$6 million. By March 2000, two small slopes had been overhauled, but work on the larger, more dangerous slopes had yet to begin. The Monastery blamed excessive red tape on the part of the Buildings Department for putting off approval of the reconstruction works. Although the temple was partially opened again a few months after the mudslide, the entire complex was not reopened until 31 July 2000. It can now choose to close in the event of heavy rain.

== Modern day ==
Before 1994, the temple was allowed to operate eateries on site without a license, and merely had to pass routine inspections carried out by health inspectors from the Regional Services Department. However, in May of that year, the Regional Council passed stricter rules requiring monastery restaurants to follow the Food Business (Regional Council) Bylaws. This would entail adhering to fire, building and fuel installation standards, in addition to hygiene. Despite initial fears that the cost of improving amenities would be beyond their financial means, the Monastery continues to operate a vegetarian restaurant, that serves – among other things – tofu custard (豆腐花), sweet and sour vegetarian chicken, stir-fry cashew nuts with vegetables, and other traditional Chinese vegetarian dishes.

In 2010, the Monastery was one of 52 private columbarium operators to be involved in a dispute with the Government of Hong Kong, who implicated them of "violating planning rules and land leases". Around 30,000–40,000 niches at the temple were involved in the land lease dispute. Consequently, in December of that same year, the government placed all 52 operators on a blacklist as part of a "name-and-shame campaign", but stopped short of requesting people to refrain from purchasing niches from these organizations.

Due to their historic significance, the main temple and the pagoda of the Ten Thousand Buddhas Monastery are listed as Grade III historic buildings. Hence, they are deemed by the Antiquities Advisory Board as having "some merit", and that preserving the two buildings in some manner would be preferable, although different methods could be considered if their preservation is not feasible. Their graded status was approved of on 31 August 2010.

== Architecture ==
Man Fat Tsz Main Temple Building Man Fat Tsz Pagoda
- 萬佛寺萬佛殿 萬佛寺佛塔 (Chinese)
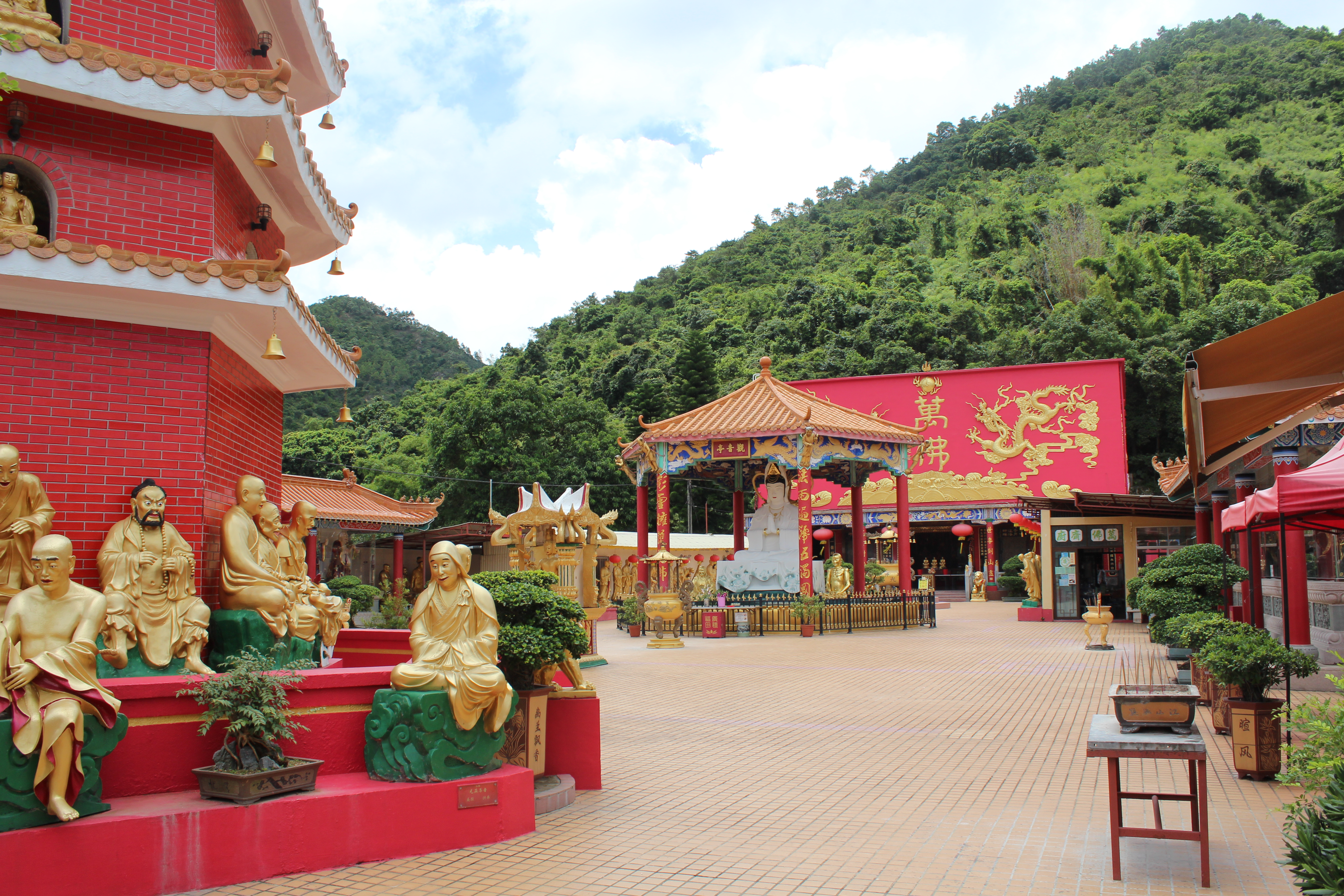
- Base of the pagoda (left) and the Main Plaza
- Interactive map of Man Fat Tsz Main Temple Building; Man Fat Tsz Pagoda

History
- Built: 1949–1957

Hong Kong Graded Building – Grade III
- Designated: 31 August 2010; 16 years ago
- Reference no.: 171 and 172

The Ten Thousand Buddhas Monastery is located on a hillside in Pai Tau Village and is accessible by stairwell consisting of 431 "steep steps". These are surrounded on both sides by statues of arhats – the Buddhist equivalent of saints who have achieved enlightenment. They were produced by artists from Yunnan and Guangdong provinces, and are modeled after ones situated at a temple in Kunming, the hometown of founder Yuet Kai. The creation and installation of these statues – which commenced in 2001 without prior authorization from the government – led to a minor rift between the monastery and the local authorities. The latter contended that this was in contravention of the city's building code and that it would create a landslide hazard that could result in fatalities during the region's rainy season. After a safety assessment, the statues were allowed to remain, and they continue to line the route up to the monastery.

The complex covers over 8 hectares (0.080 km^{2}) and is divided over two floors. The upper level consists of four halls dedicated to Kwun Yam and other Buddhist and Taoist deities that contain various Buddha statues, while the lower floor features another hall, a pagoda that is nine storeys high, a tower and two pavilions.

In total, there are close to 13,000 Buddha statues at the monastery; this is in spite of the temple's "Ten Thousand" title. While 12,000 has been cited as the lower estimation, writers in the Lonely Planet guide book surmise that there "some 12,800" statutes on the monastery grounds. Several of these originate from the Tang dynasty.

== In media ==
The Monastery has been featured in films and television series over the years. In the 1995 American action series Vanishing Son, it was the location of a martial arts fight scene between the protagonist (played by Russell Wong) and a "sword-wielding adversary" of his. The temple was also the setting of the opening scene in the 2002 local crime-thriller Infernal Affairs. The triad boss in the film, Hon Sam (portrayed by Eric Tsang, incidentally a devout Buddhist), prays in front of a statue of Buddha at the temple. His young followers – who are also gathered there – then toast their loyalty to him, prior to dispersing with instructions from Hon to infiltrate the Hong Kong Police Force as his moles.

== Photos ==
Ten Thousand Buddhas Monastery

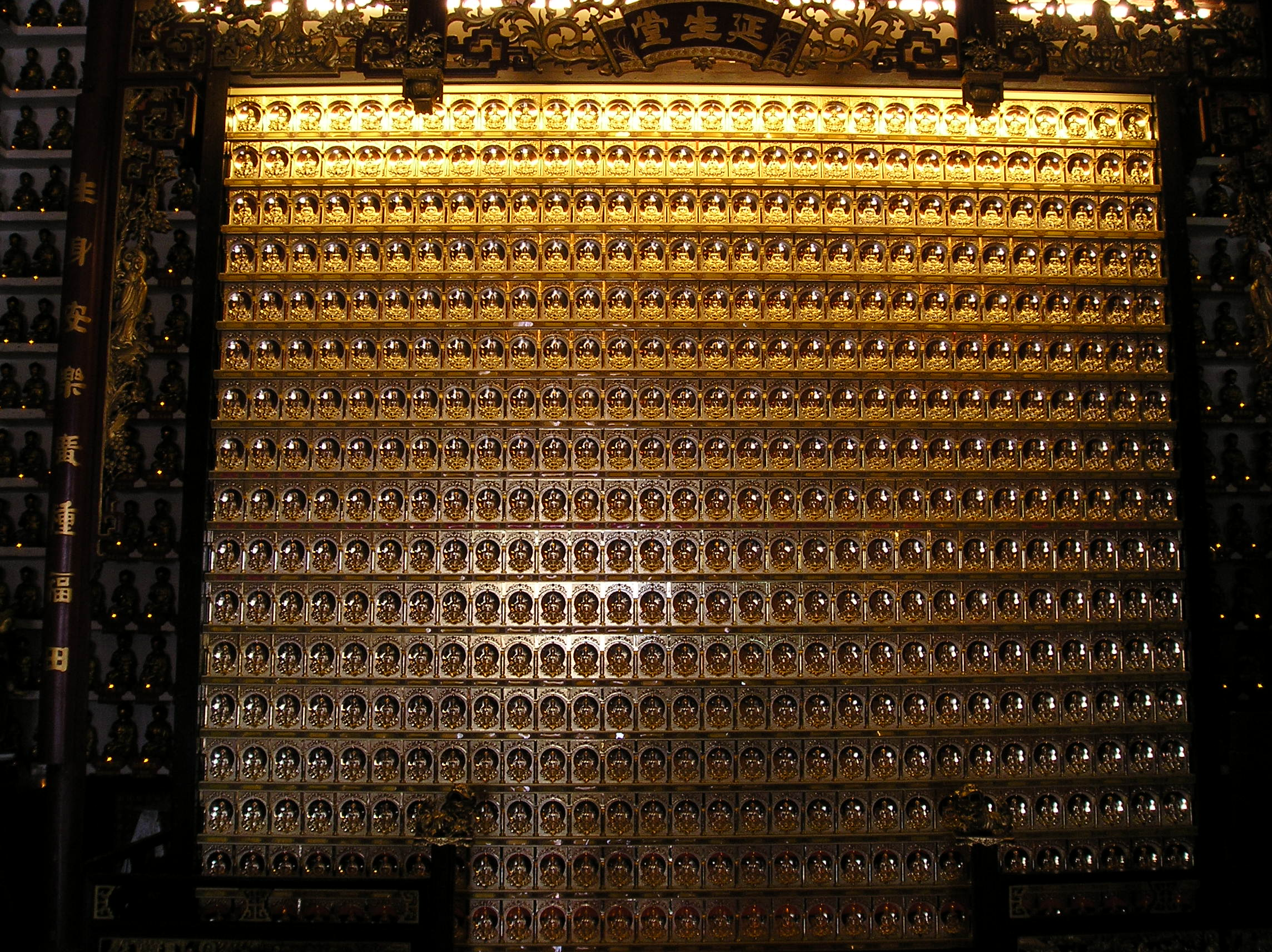
Wall with some of the smaller Buddha statues inside the temple

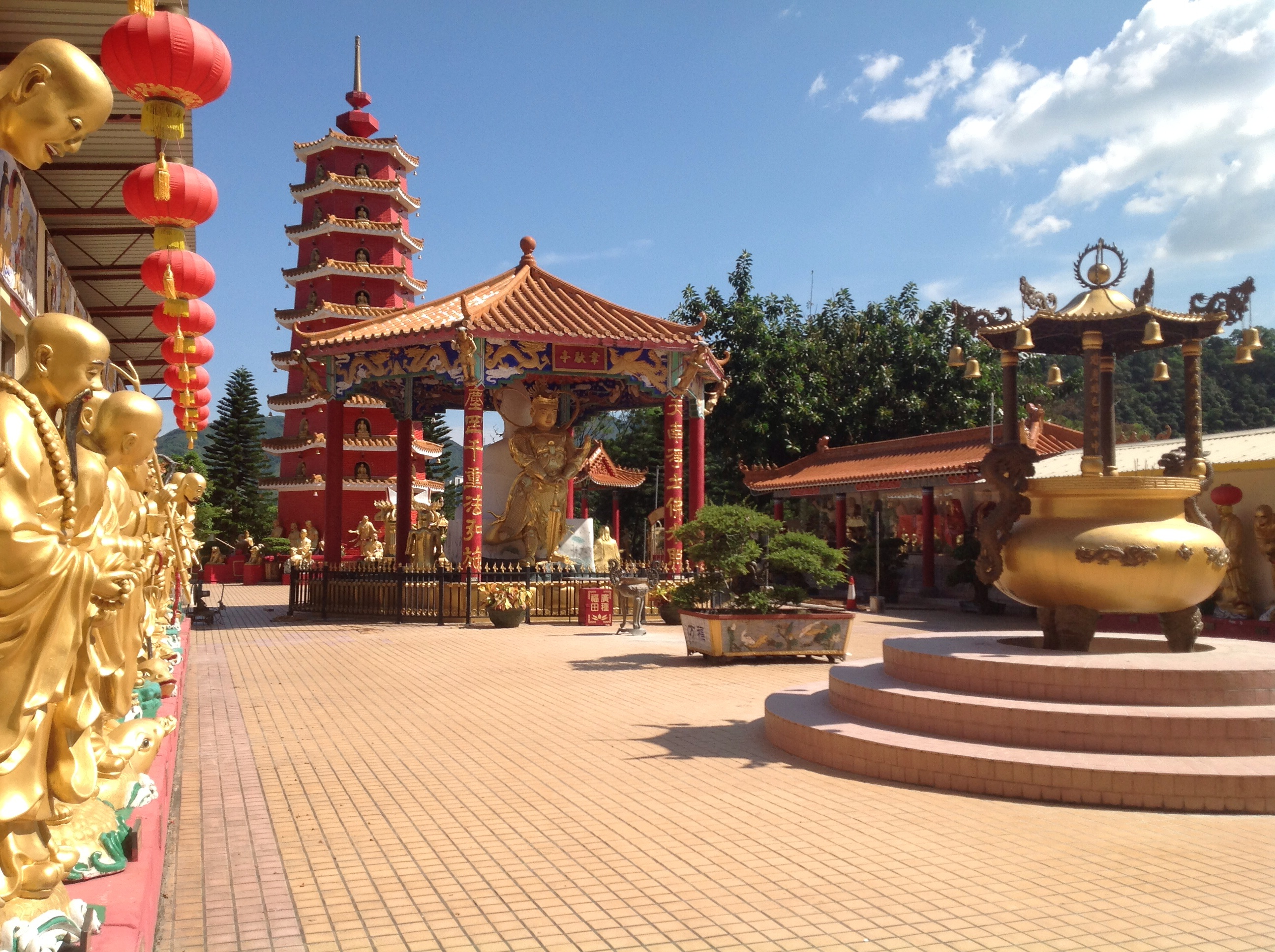
View of the Main Plaza

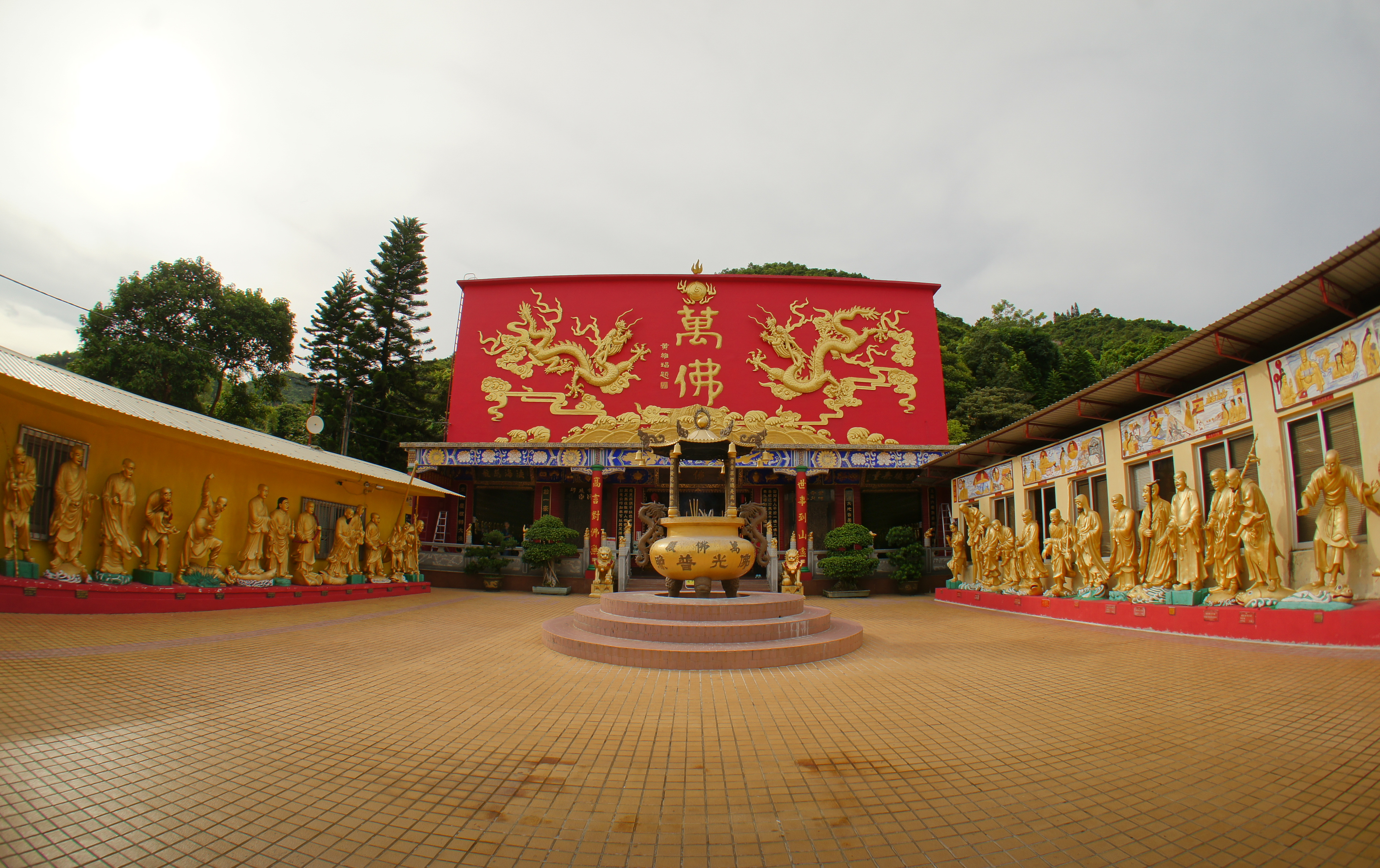
Main shrine and the courtyard of the Ten Thousand Buddhas Monastery

== See also ==
- Wanfu Temple
- City of Ten Thousand Buddhas, located in Ukiah, California
