= Sheung Shui Wai =

Sheung Shui Wai 上水圍 (Chinese)
- Area
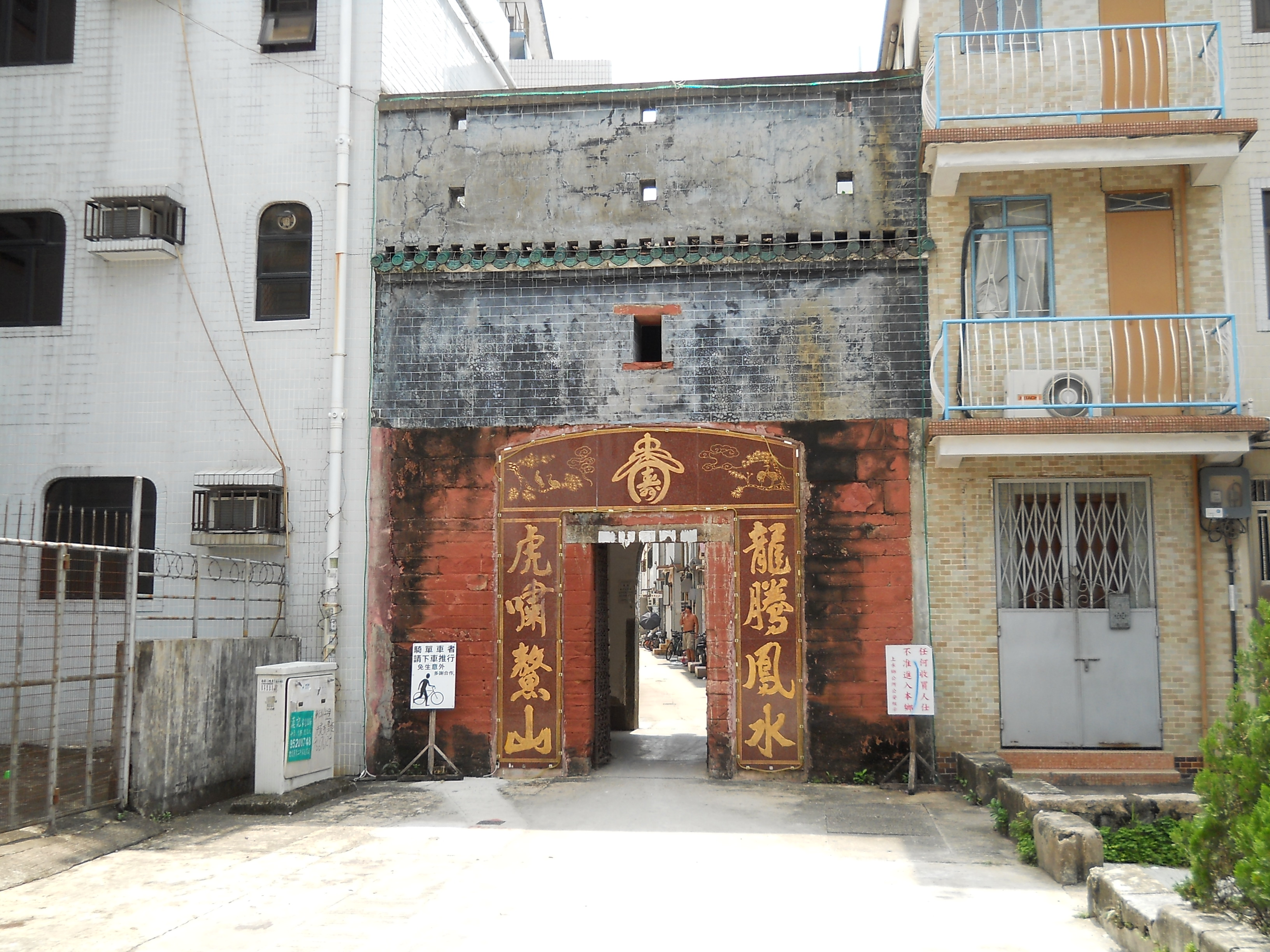
- Entrance gate of Wai Loi Tsuen.

- Location within Hong Kong
- Coordinates: 22.509346°N 114.124772°E
- Country: People's Republic of China
- Special administrative region: Hong Kong
- Region: New Territories
- Area: Sheung Shui
- Established: End of the 16th century
- Founder: Liu (廖) clan

Population
  - Total: 6,000
- Time zone: UTC+8:00 (HKT)

Sheung Shui Wai (Chinese: 上水圍), also known as Sheung Shui Heung (上水鄉) is an area in Sheung Shui, in the northern part of the New Territories of Hong Kong. Its population is around 6,000 people.

== Administration ==
For electoral purposes, Sheung Shui Wai is part of the Fung Tsui constituency of the North District Council. It was formerly represented by Chiang Man-ching, who was elected in the local elections until July 2021.

== Villages ==
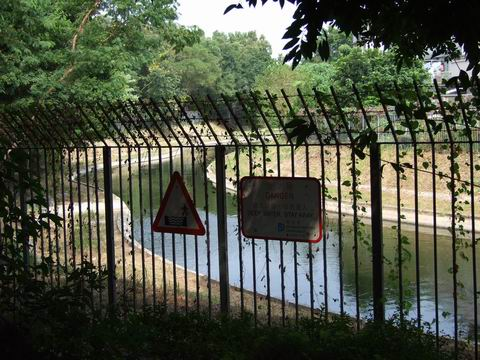
The moat of Wai Loi Tsuen.

Sheung Shui Heung consists of the following villages:

- Wai Loi Tsuen (圍內村)
- Man Kok Village (文閣村)
- Ha Pak Tsuen (下北村)
- Sheung Pak Tsuen (上北村)
- Chung Sum Tsuen (中心村)
- Tai Yuen Tsuen (大元村)
- Hing Yan Tsuen (興仁村)
- Po Sheung Tsuen (莆上村)
- Mun Hau Tsuen (門口村)

== History ==
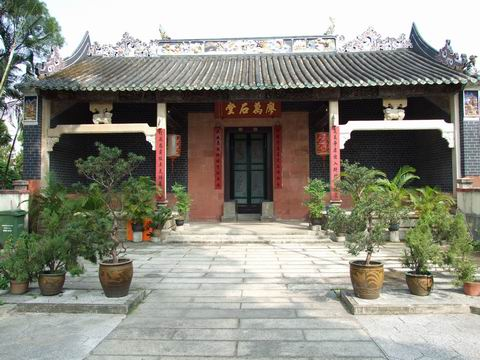
Liu Man Shek Tong Ancestral Hall in Mun Hau Tsuen.

The area is the core of the Liu (廖) clan, of which ancestors came originally from Fujian during the Yuan Dynasty (1271–1368). It is widely believed that the Liu clan began to settle in this part of the New Territories at the end of the 16th century.

Wai Loi Tsuen is the area's original settlement, with its construction completed around 1584. In 1688, the size of the clan was approximately 500. As the population grew, other settlements were added: Po Sheung Tsuen, Chung Sum Tsuen and Mun Hau Tsuen were founded between 1819 and 1898. The villages are collectively named "Sheung Shui Heung".

== Sights ==
=== Wai Loi Tsuen ===
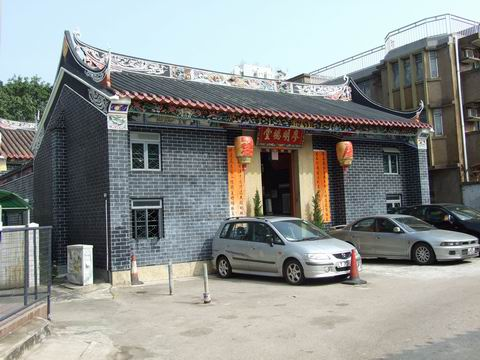
Liu Ming Tak Tong Ancestral Hall.

Wai Loi Tsuen is a walled village. It is the area's original settlement, with its construction completed around 1584. It is one of the very few rural settlements having retained its original moat. The wall and the moat around Wai Loi Tsuen were constructed between 1646 and 1647. The village contains a Tin Hau and a Hung Shing temples. Both have been renovated to modern structures.

=== Liu Man Shek Tong Ancestral Hall ===
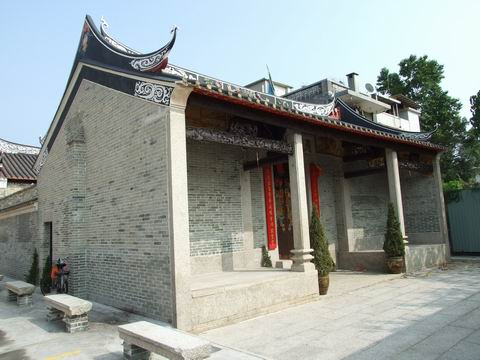
Liu Ying Lung Study Hall.

The Liu Man Shek Tong Ancestral Hall (廖萬石堂) in Mun Hau Tsuen was built in 1751. The three-hall two-courtyard building is the main ancestral hall of the Liu of the area. It is a declared monument since January 18, 1985.

=== Liu Ming Tak Tong Ancestral Hall ===
Liu Ming Tak Tong Ancestral Hall, located in Po Sheung Tsuen, was first built in 1811 or 1828. The building was demolished in 1972 and reconstructed in 1973, with only a granite door frame remaining from the original hall.

=== Liu Ying Lung Study Hall ===
The Liu Ying Lung Study Hall (應龍廖公家塾), located at Po Sheung Tsuen, was built in 1838. It is a traditional two-hall study hall with an open courtyard in between. It is a Grade II Historic Building. A restoration project was conducted ahead of the once-in-60-year dajiao festival held in 2006. The project won an Honourable Mention in the 2006 UNESCO Asia-Pacific Heritage Awards for Culture Heritage Conservation.

=== Old Sheung Shui Police Station ===
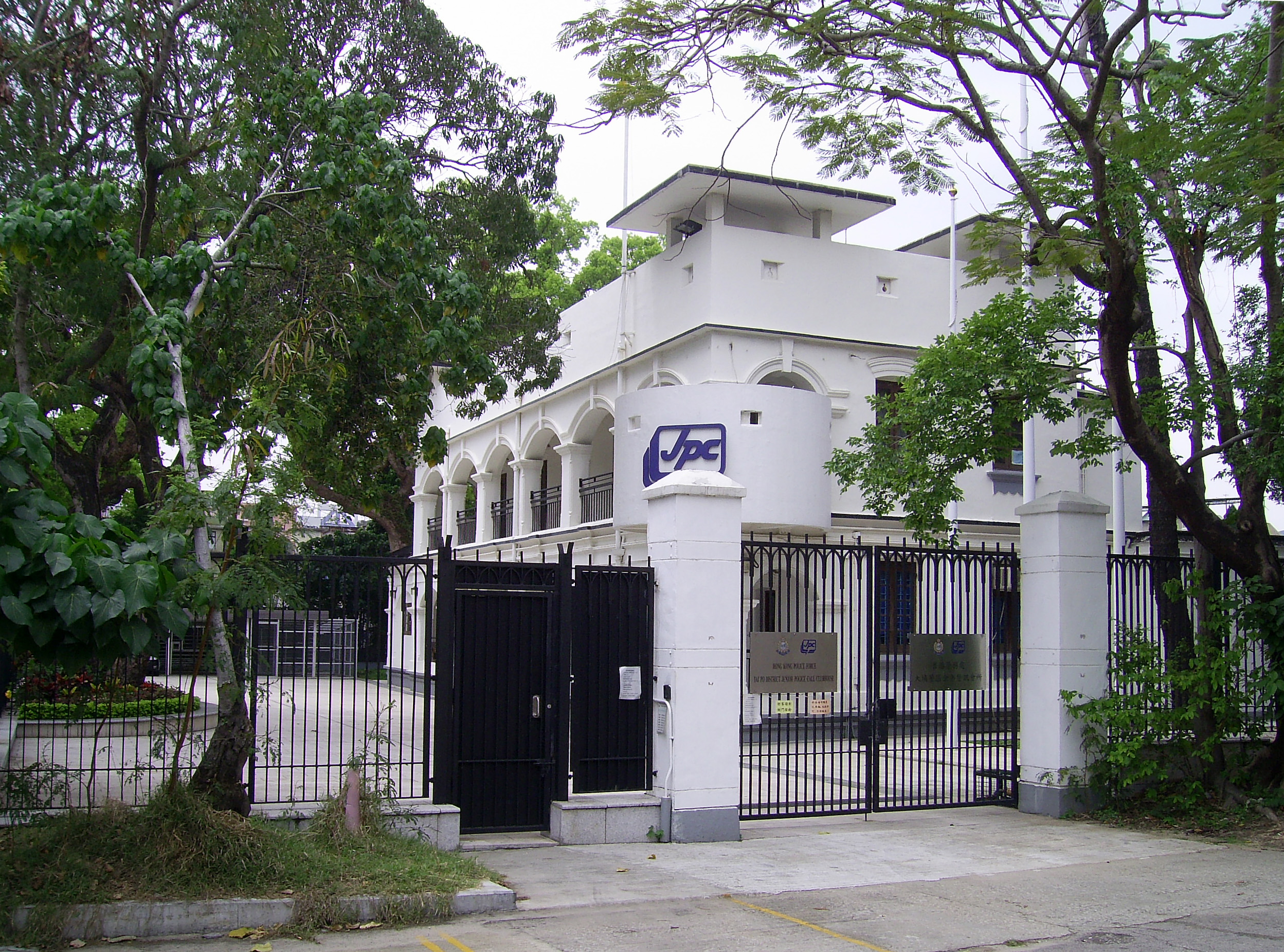
The Old Sheung Shui Police Station houses a Junior Police Corps (JPC) Club House.

The Old Sheung Shui Police Station (舊上水警署), located in Po Sheung Tsuen, was built in 1902. When the new Sheung Shui Police Station opened in 1979, the old station became a police reporting centre, and later housed a Junior Police Corps (JPC) Club House. It is a Grade III historic building.
