= Grand Central Plaza =

Commercial development in Sha Tin, Hong Kong

Grand Central Plaza HomeSquare

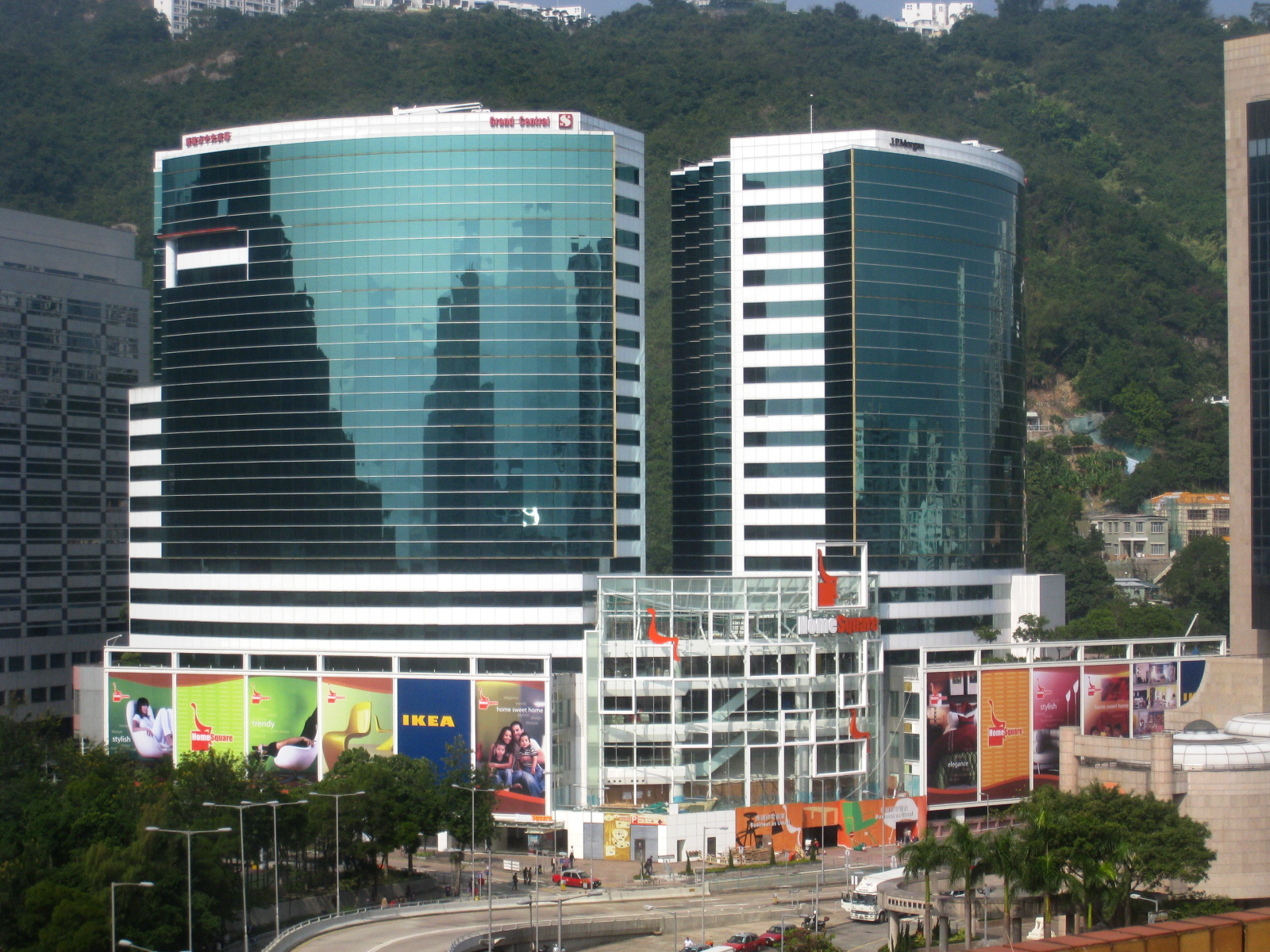
- Location: 138 Sha Tin Rural Committee Road, Sha Tin, Hong Kong
- Coordinates: 22°23′08″N 114°11′16″E
- Opened: 1995; 31 years ago
- Owner: Sun Hung Kai Properties
- Public transit: Sha Tin station

Grand Central Plaza
- Traditional Chinese: 新城市中央廣場
- Simplified Chinese: 新城市中央广场
Transcriptions
Standard Mandarin
- Hanyu Pinyin: xin1 cheng2 shi4 zhong1 yang1 guang3 chang3
Yue: Cantonese
- Jyutping: san1 sing4 si5 zung1 joeng1 gwong2 coeng4

Grand Central Plaza (Chinese: 新城市中央廣場) is a commercial development located near the town centre of Sha Tin, Hong Kong. It comprises two 16-storey office towers atop a multi-storey shopping podium called HomeSquare which specialises in home decor and furnishings. It is owned by Sun Hung Kai Properties, which also owns the nearby New Town Plaza, and was completed in 1995.

== Tenants ==
HomeSquare is a thematic shopping centre housed in the podium base of the development and designed by architect Barrie Ho. It is owned by Sun Hung Kai Properties, and has five floors filled with shops offering home furnishings. The grand opening and renaming ceremony was held on 7 November 2010 following refurbishment of the retail levels.

An IKEA store, one of four in Hong Kong, occupies 120,000 square feet (11,000 m^{2}) of the uppermost podium levels and was the largest in Hong Kong until the Kowloon Bay store relocated from Telford Gardens to MegaBox.

Atop the shopping levels are two office towers which provide more than 620,000 square feet (58,000 m^{2}) of office space.

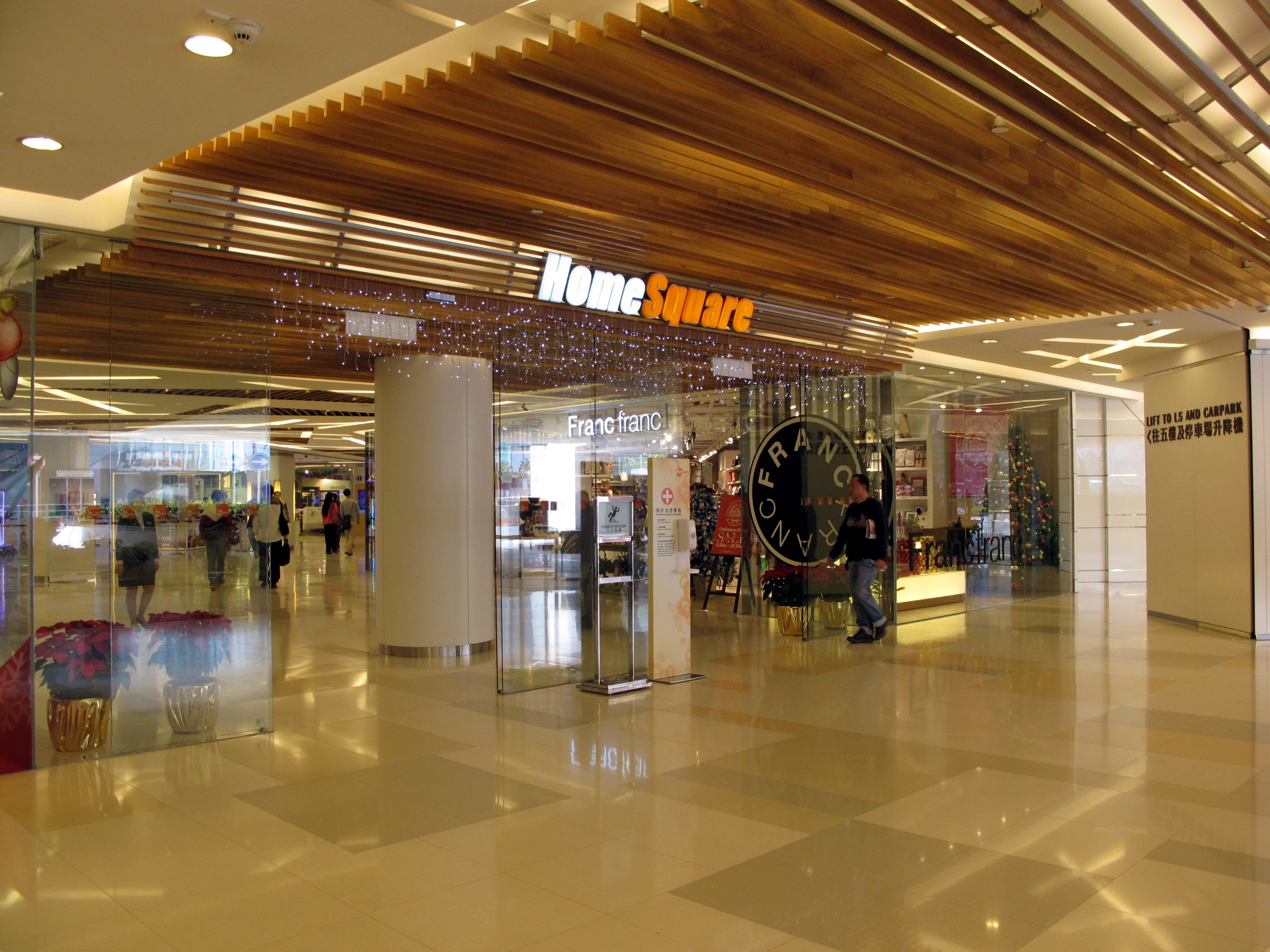
HomeSquare entrance

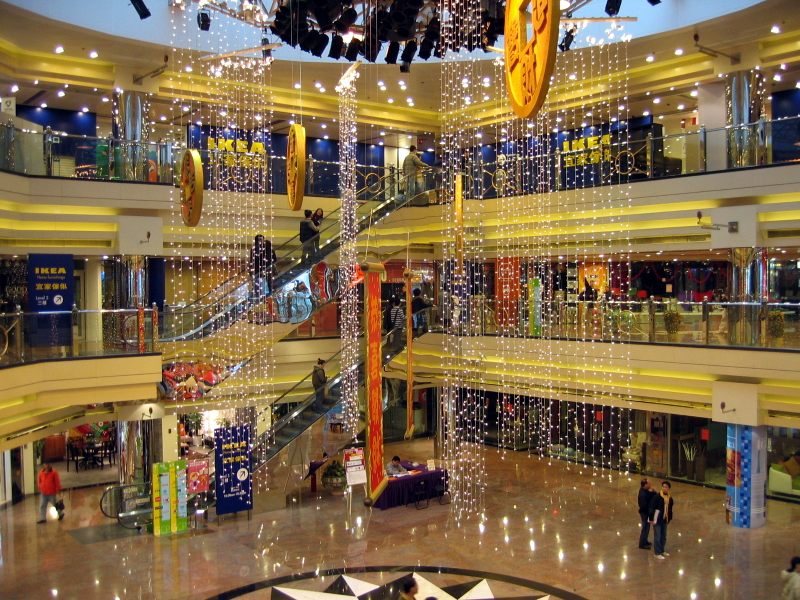
Atrium before renovation

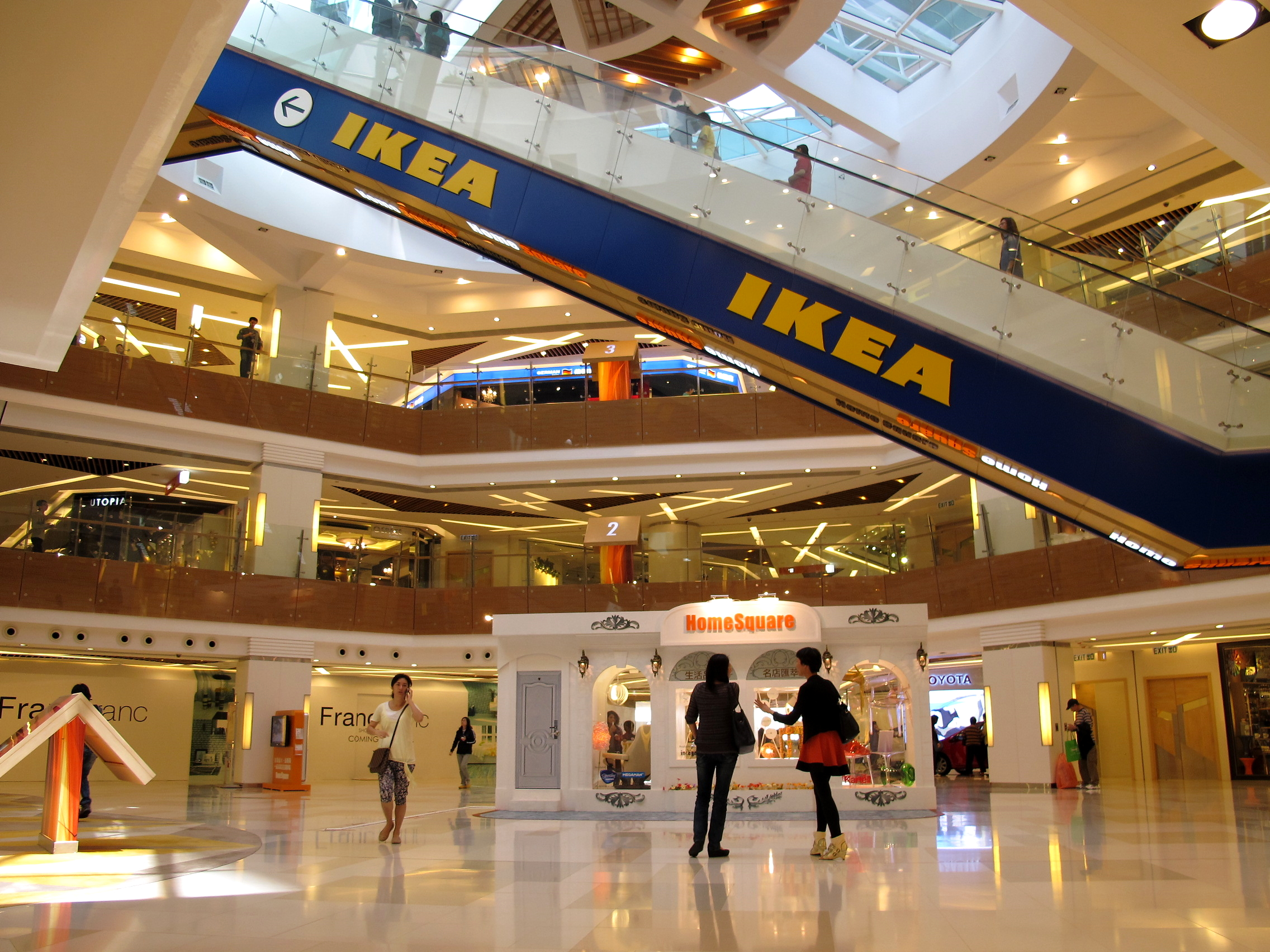
Atrium after renovation

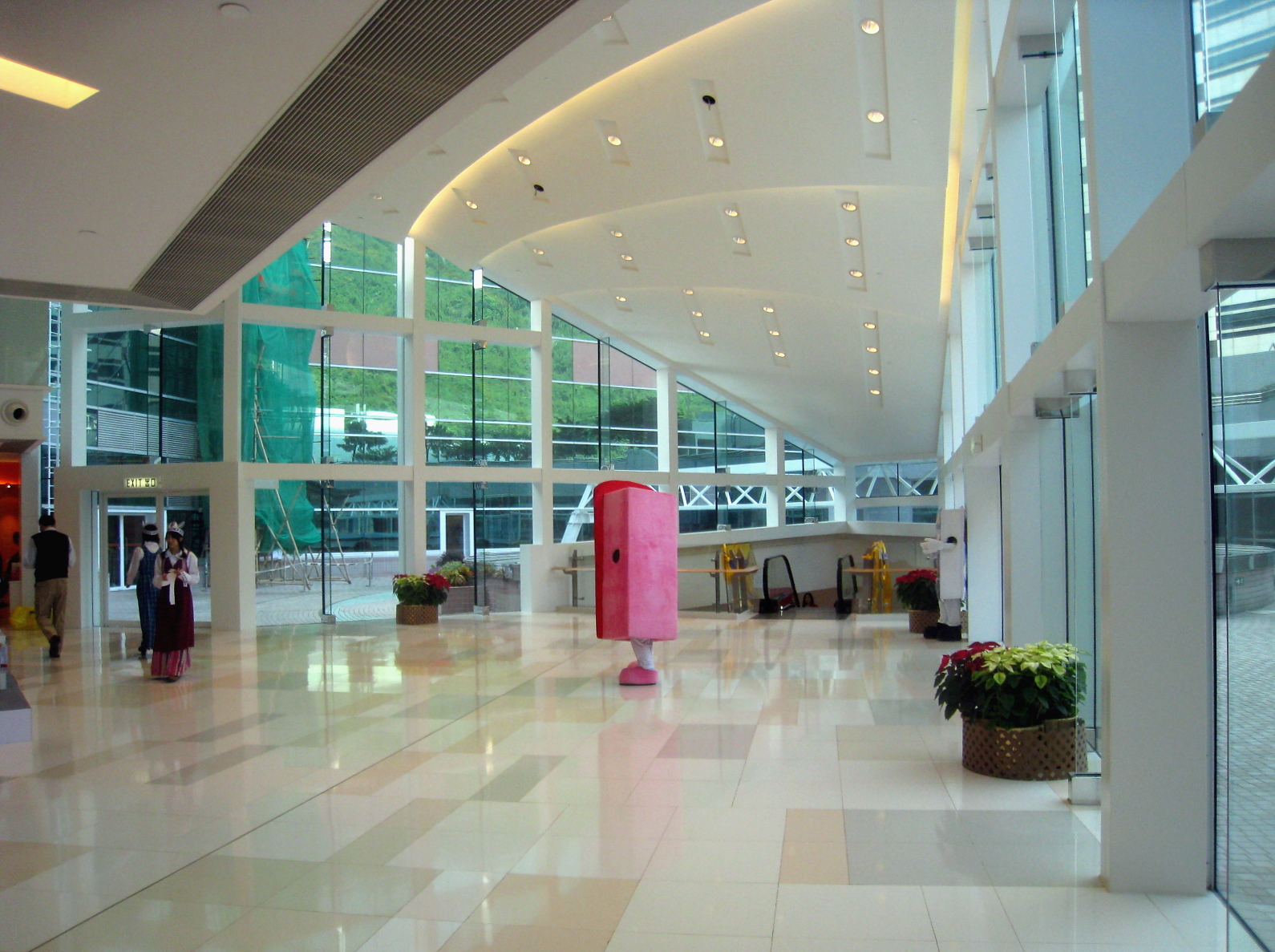
Fifth storey

== Footbridge controversy ==
Grand Central Plaza is part of the New Town Plaza development. Both properties are owned by the same developer, Sun Hung Kai. Most patrons access Grand Central Plaza by descending a rampway attached to Sha Tin station and walking a short distance along the public pavement of Pai Tau Street.

The government and Sun Hung Kai Properties proposed in 2002 the construction of a four-metre-wide footbridge along this street to link the railway station concourse with Grand Central Plaza and the Sha Tin Government Offices. Sun Hung Kai has offered to finance the bridge, and Grand Central Plaza is equipped with a reserved stub at the first storey to which the footbridge is meant to connect.

The proposal was met with great resistance from residents of Pai Tau Village, located directly between the railway station and the shopping centre. The villagers objected to the trimming of trees which shield the buildings from the busy roadway, and stated that the footbridge would bring bad feng shui to their traditional village. They also complained that their concerns were ignored by the Sha Tin District Council, and that their counter-proposal for a different footbridge route was not taken seriously.

However, in May 2012 the government stated that they would not pursue construction of the footbridge in the short-term owing to various engineering and cost concerns. They instead outlined several plans to improve the walkway along Pai Tau Street.

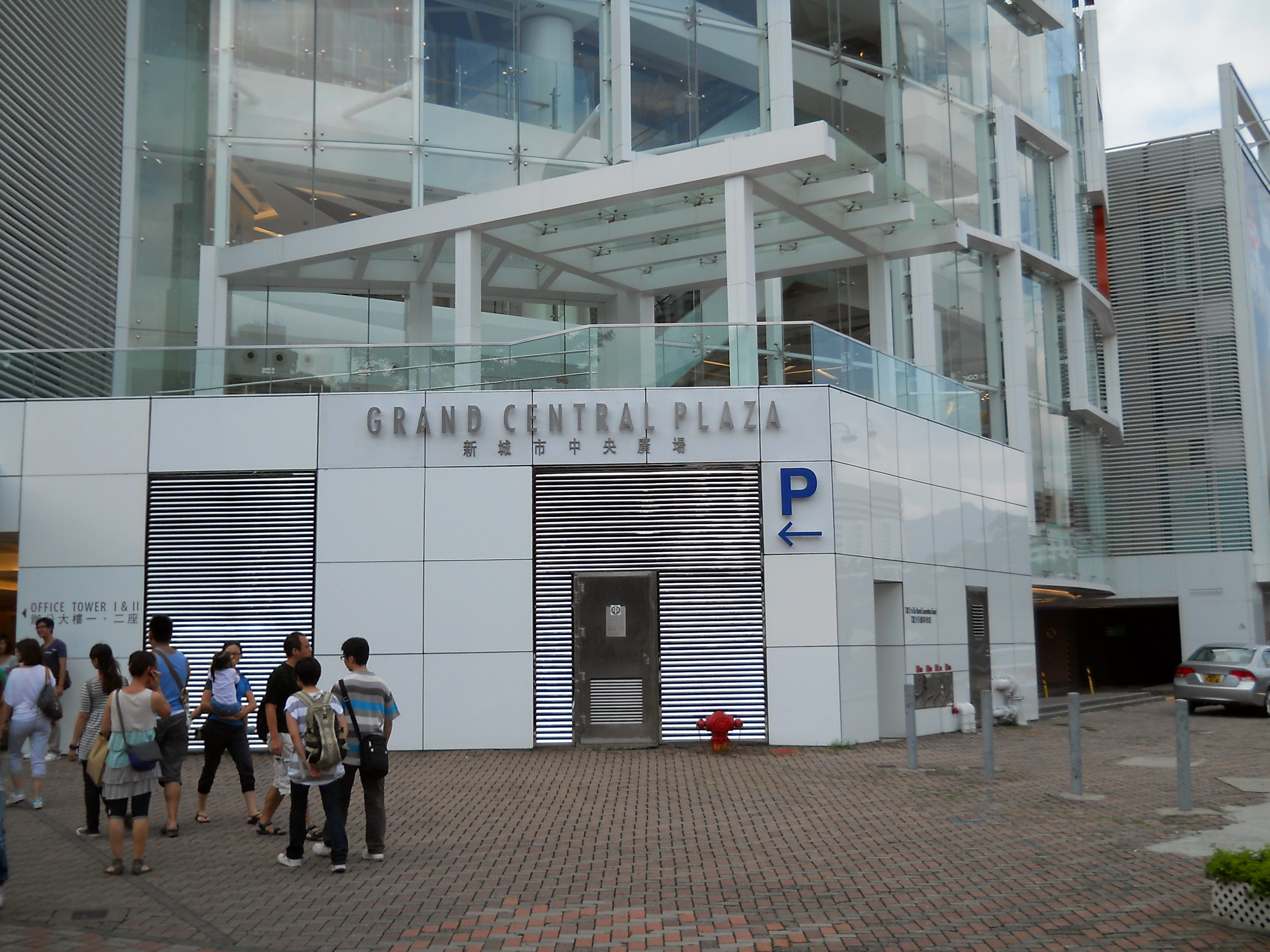
Reservation for proposed footbridge

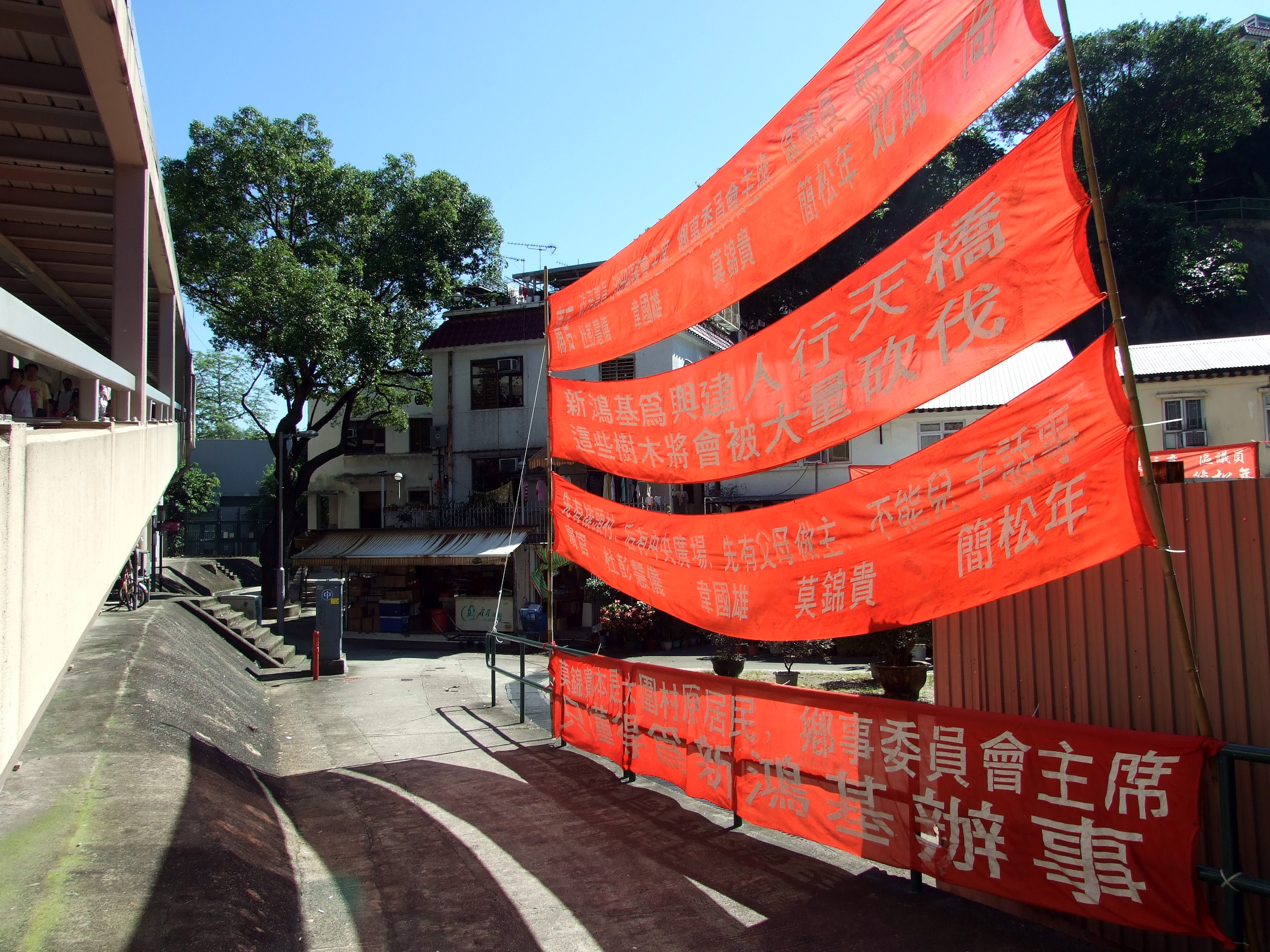
Protest banners at Pai Tau Village

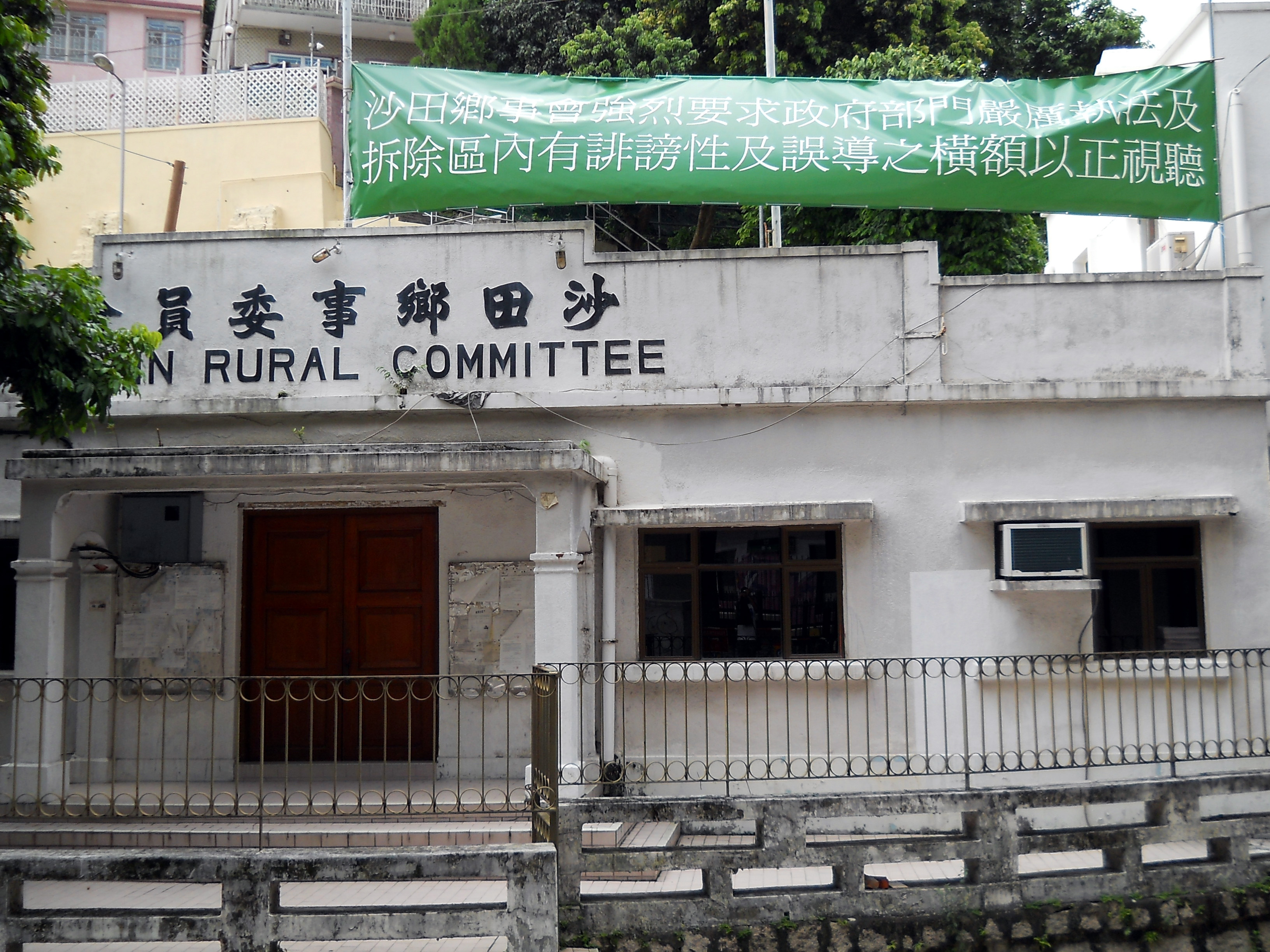
Banners at the Sha Tin Rural Committee
