= Magazine Island =

Island in Hong Kong

Native name: 火藥洲
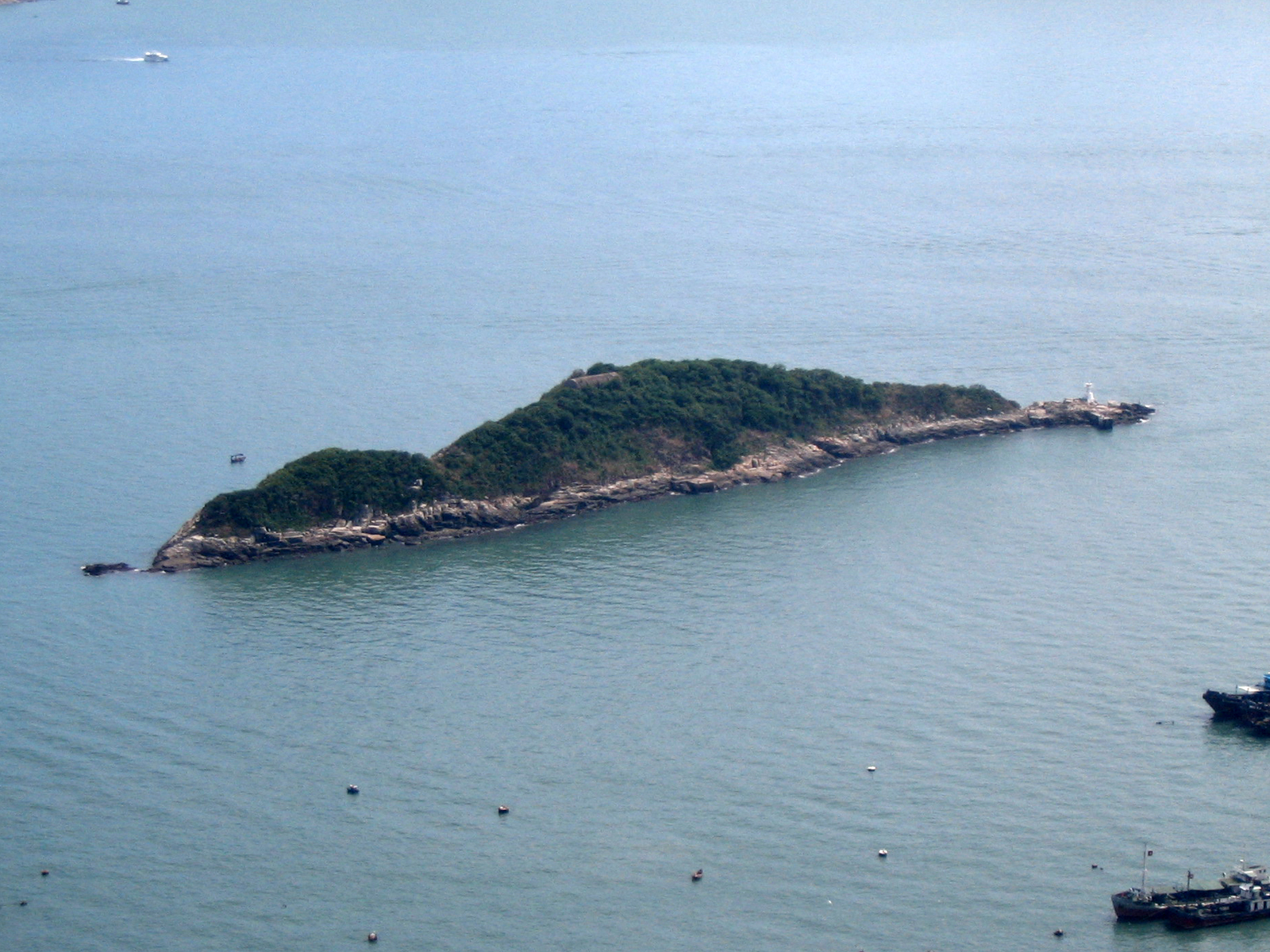
- Magazine Island

- Location within Hong Kong

Geography
- Coordinates: 22°14.6′N 114°8.377′E

Administration
- Hong Kong
- Districts: Southern District

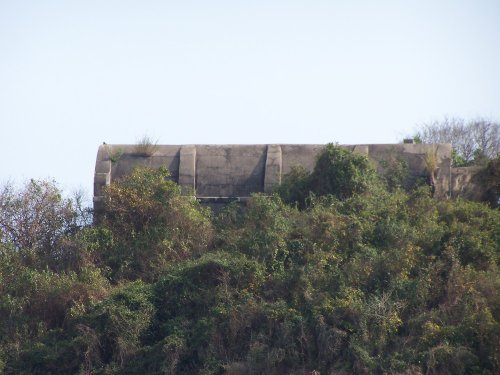
Former Magazine Building.

Magazine Island (Chinese: 火藥洲; Fo Yeuk Chau), originally known as One Tree Island (一木島), is an island of Hong Kong, located off the southwest coast of Hong Kong Island, and off the northwestern tip of Ap Lei Chau. For the purpose of local council, it is part of Southern District.

== Features ==
The former Magazine Building on Magazine Island is now a Grade III Historic Building. It was built by the British Dynamite Company, which later became Nobel's Explosives Company, and was once the largest private explosives depot in Hong Kong. In 1908, the government did not renew the company's contract and the magazine was closed. A lighthouse is located at the west end of the island.

== See also ==
- List of islands of Hong Kong
- List of lighthouses in Hong Kong
