= Ngau Keng Tsuen =

Coordinates: 22.424329°N 114.08574°E

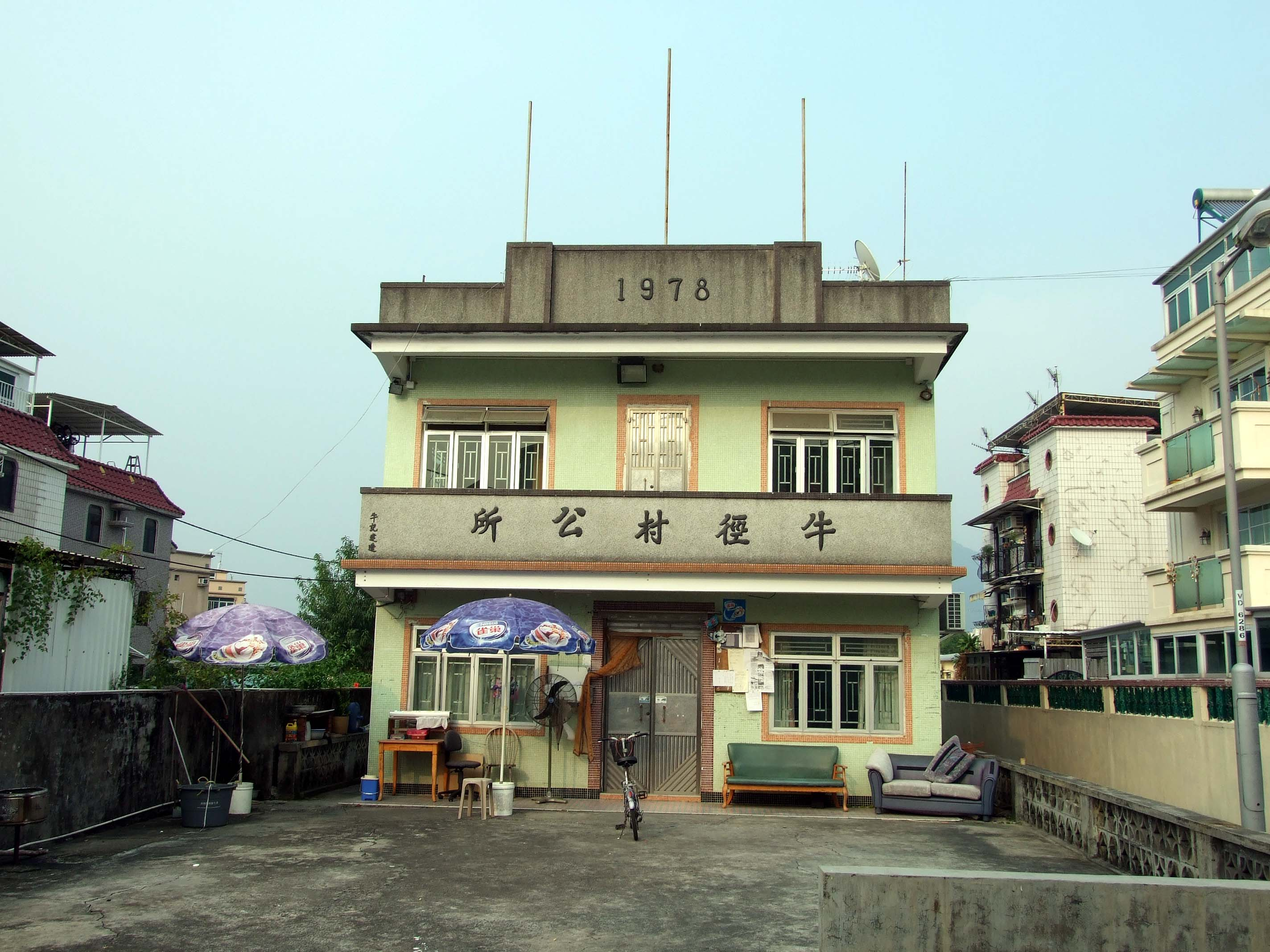
Ngau Keng Tsuen Village Office.

Ngau Keng Tsuen (Chinese: 牛徑村) is a village in Pat Heung, Yuen Long District, Hong Kong.

== Administration ==
Ngau Keng Tsuen is a recognized village under the New Territories Small House Policy.
