= Kam Shan, Tai Po District =

Coordinates: 22.448328°N 114.15925°E

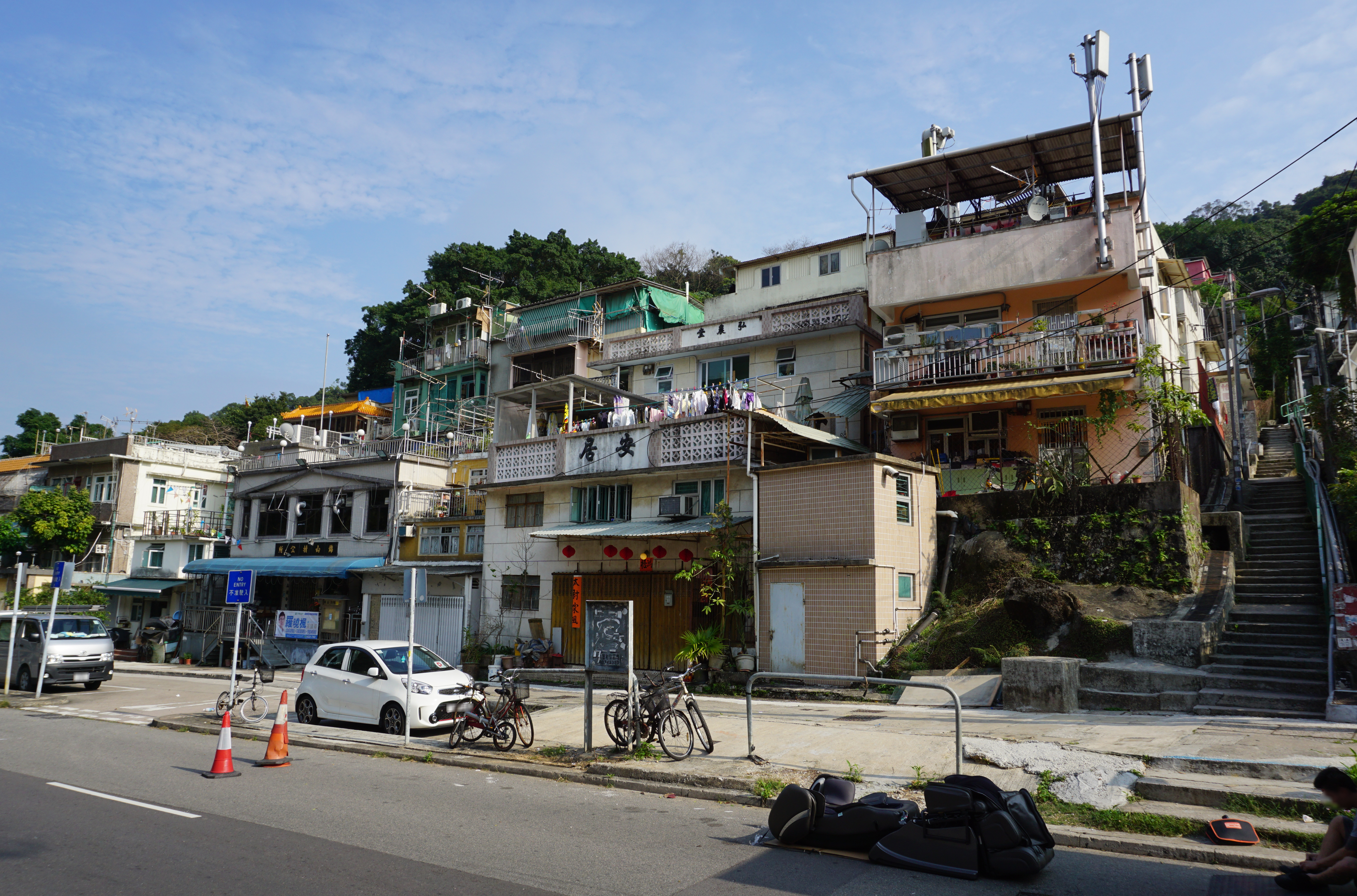
Kam Shan Village along Kam Shan Road.

Kam Shan (Chinese: 錦山) is an area of Tai Po District, Hong Kong, including and surrounding Kam Shan Village (錦山村).

== Administration ==
Kam Shan is a recognised village under the New Territories Small House Policy. It is one of the villages represented within the Tai Po Rural Committee. For electoral purposes, Kam Shan is part of the San Fu constituency, which was formerly represented by Max Wu Yiu-cheong until May 2021.
