= Pai Tau Village =

Village in Sha Tin, Hong Kong

Coordinates: 22.383956°N 114.187493°E

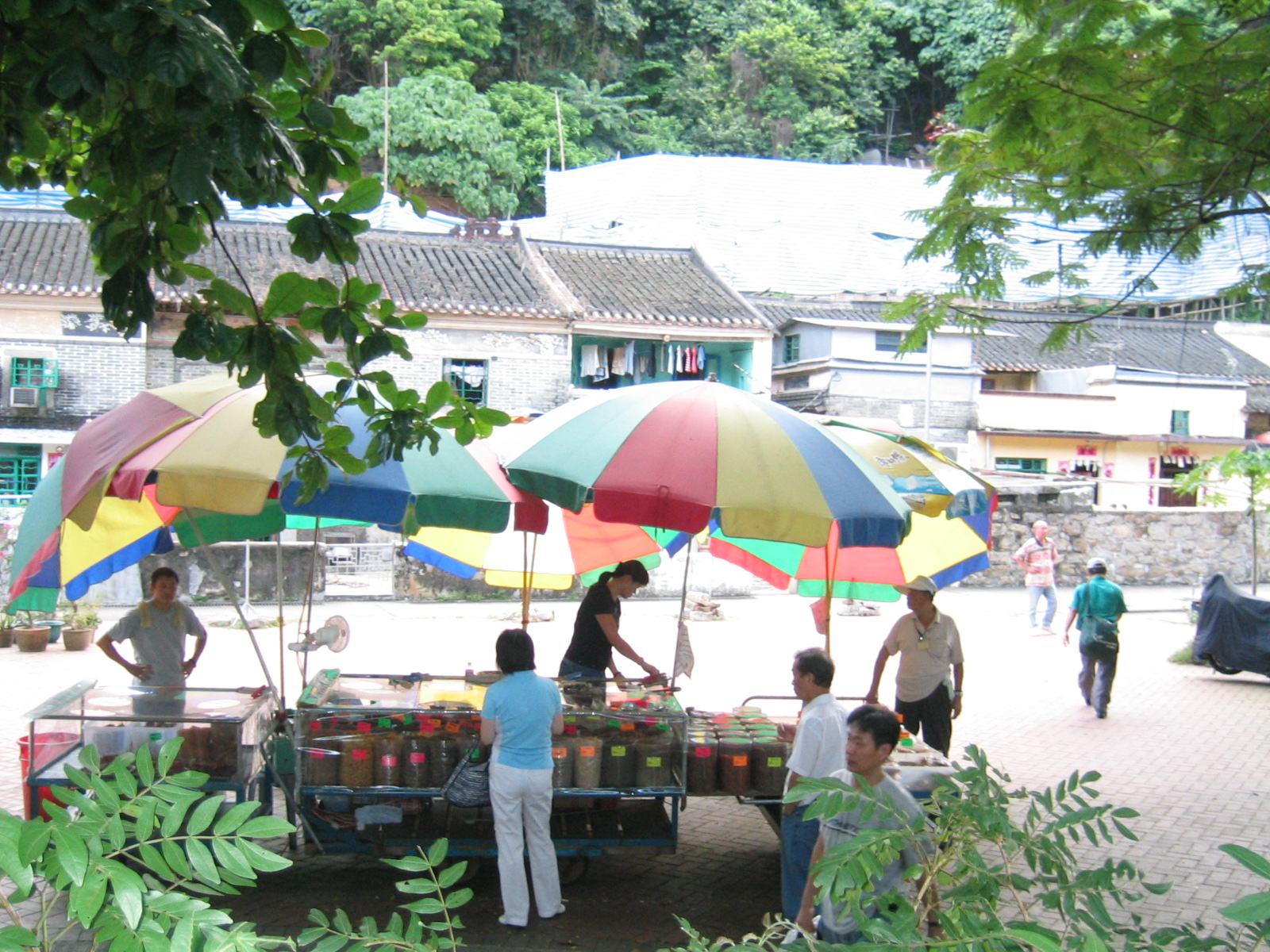
Stall selling local snacks at Pai Tau Village

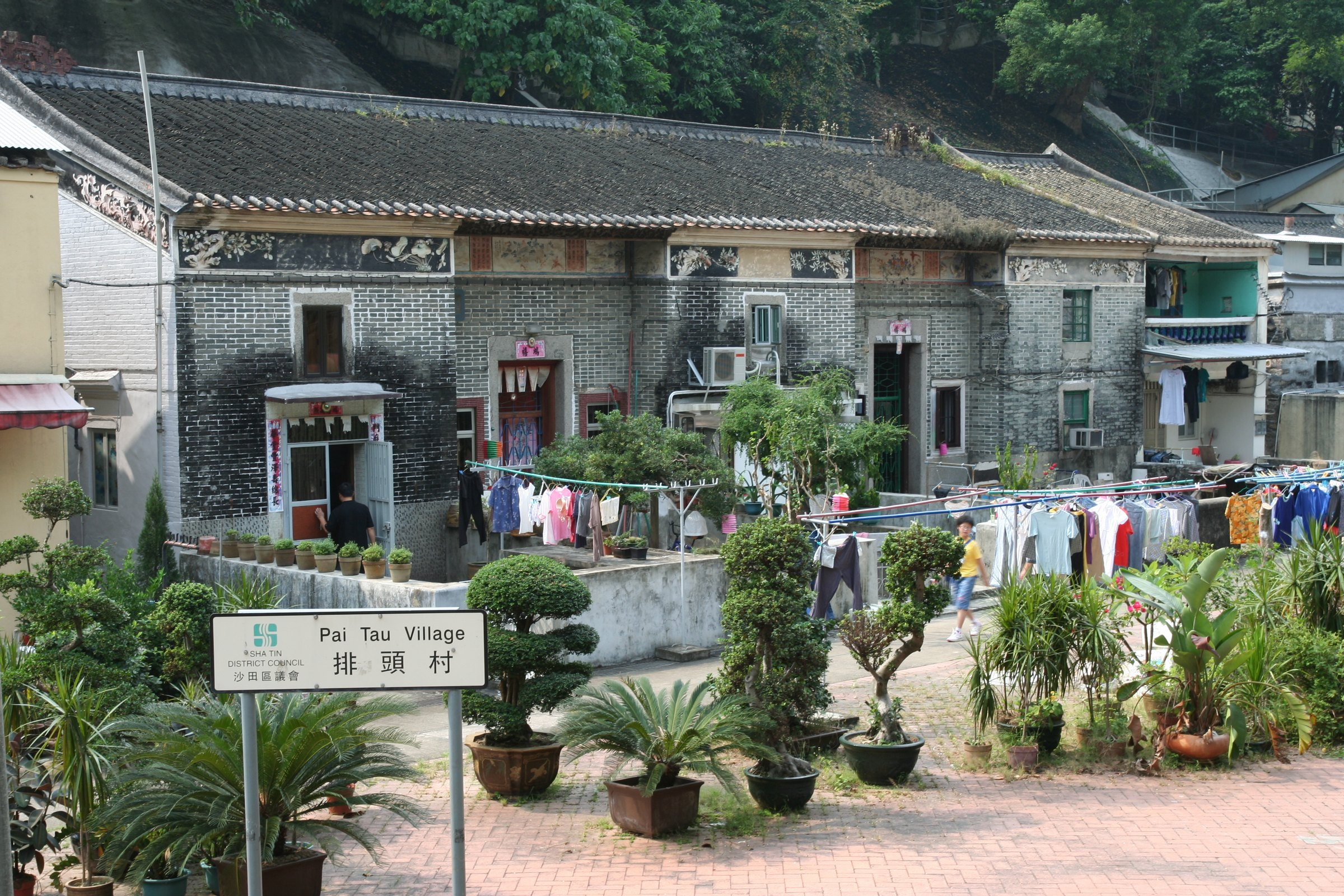
Nos. 5A, B, C and 6 Pai Tau Village

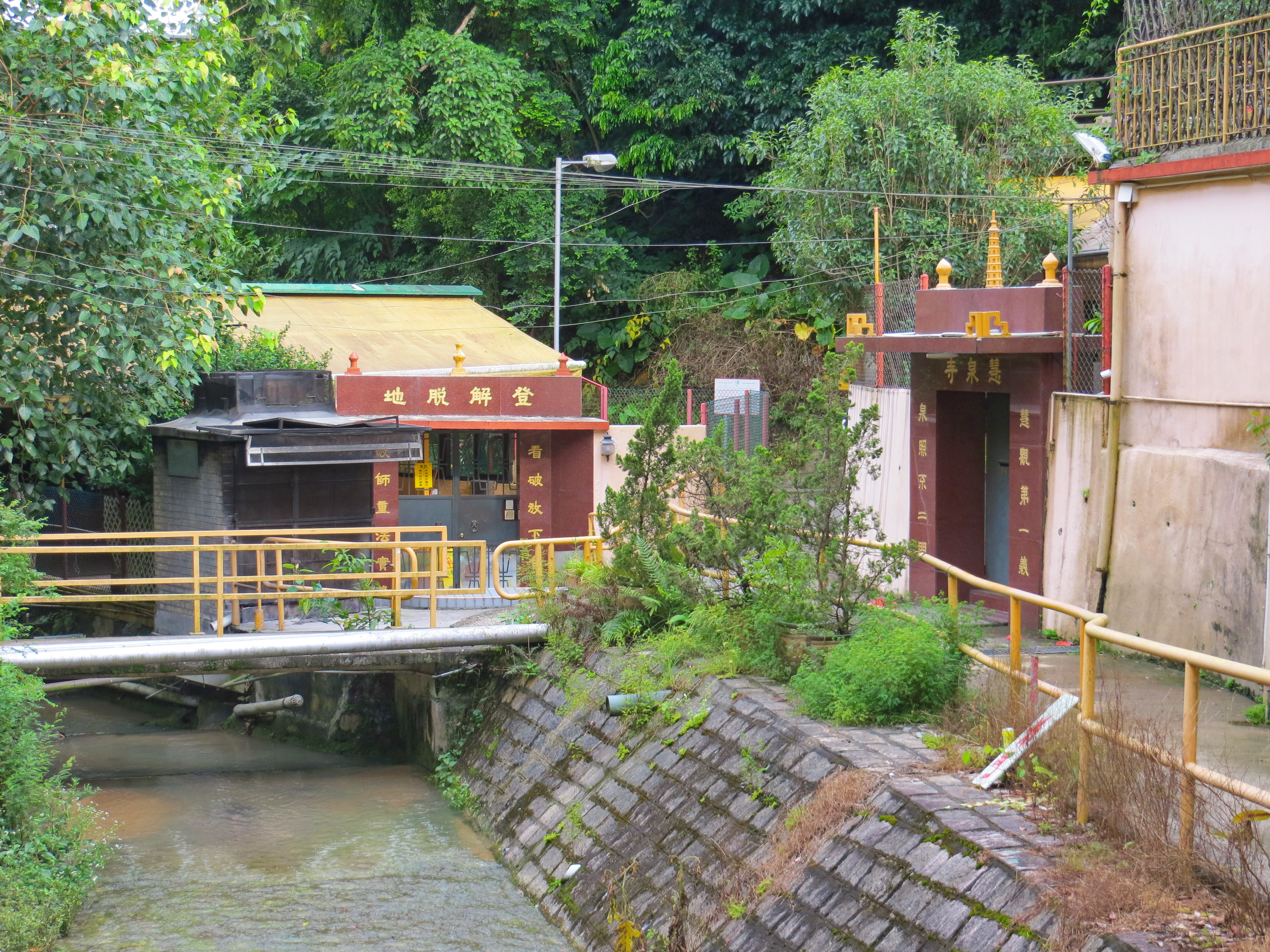
Wai Chuen Monastery (慧泉寺), one of several Buddhist monasteries in the valley above Pai Tau Village.

Pai Tau Village (traditional Chinese: 排頭村; simplified Chinese: 排头村) is a village located in Sha Tin, Hong Kong.

== Administration ==
Pai Tau is a recognized village under the New Territories Small House Policy. It is one of the villages represented within the Sha Tin Rural Committee. For electoral purposes, Pai Tau Village is part of the Lek Yuen constituency, which was formerly represented by Jimmy Sham Tsz-kit until July 2021.

== Location ==
The village is located next to Sha Tin station on the Hong Kong MTR.

== Features ==
- The buildings at Nos. 5A, 5B, 5C and 6 Pai Tau Village are listed as Grade II Historic Buildings.
- The Lam Ancestral Hall in Pai Tau Village, is a Grade III Historic Building.
- Tin Liu (田寮), also a recognized village under the New Territories Small House Policy, is adjacent to Pai Tau Village, to the west

== See also ==
- Grand Central Plaza § Footbridge controversy
- Kau Yeuk (Sha Tin)
- Sha Tin Rural Committee
- Ten Thousand Buddhas Monastery
