= Fung Tsui (constituency) =

- Elected constituency for the North District Council
- Boundary of Fung Tsui in North District
- District: North
- Legislative Council constituency: New Territories North
- Population: 18,664 (2019)
- Electorate: 9,706 (2019)

Current constituency
- Created: 1999
- Number of members: One
- Member: vacant

Fung Tsui is one of the 17 constituencies in the North District, Hong Kong. The constituency returns one district councillor to the North District Council, with an election every four years.

Fung Tsui constituency is loosely based on Man Kok Village, Ha Pak Tsuen, Chung Sum Tsuen, Sheung Pak Tsuen, Tai Yuen Tsuen, Hing Yan Tsuen, Po Sheung Tsuen, Wai Loi Tsuen, Mun Hau Tsuen, Hung Kiu San Tsuen and private apartments Sheung Shui Wa Shan and Tsui Lai Garden in Sheung Shui with estimated population of 14,972.

== Councillors represented ==
Election	Member	Party
1999	Liu Chiu-wah	Nonpartisan
????	Liu Chiu-wah	DAB
2007	Liu Kwok-wah	Nonpartisan
2015	Liu Hing-hung	DAB
2019	Chiang Man-ching→Vacant	Independent democrat

== Election results ==
=== 2010s ===
North District Council Election, 2019: Fung Tsui
Party	Candidate	Votes	%	±%
Ind. democrat	Chiang Man-ching	3,630	55.06	
DAB	Liu Hing-hung	2,963	44.94	+4.62
Majority		667	10.12	
Turnout		6,630	68.34	
Ind. democrat gain from DAB		Swing		

North District Council Election, 2015: Fung Tsui
Party	Candidate	Votes	%	±%
DAB	Liu Hing-hung	1,649	40.32	+21.98
Nonpartisan	Liu Kwok-wah	1,460	35.70	−8.11
Nonpartisan	Yu Man-kwong	981	23.99	
Majority		189	4.62	
Turnout		4,090	49.25	
DAB gain from Nonpartisan		Swing	+15.05	

North District Council Election, 2011: Fung Tsui
Party	Candidate	Votes	%	±%
Nonpartisan	Liu Kwok-wah	1,540	43.81	−2.95
Nonpartisan	Liu Hing-hung	996	28.34	
Nonpartisan	Liu Chiu-wah	979	27.85	−10.59
Majority		544	15.47	
Turnout		3,515	46.75	
Nonpartisan hold		Swing		

=== 2000s ===
North District Council Election, 2007: Fung Tsui
Party	Candidate	Votes	%	±%
Nonpartisan	Liu Kwok-wah	1,355	46.76	
DAB	Liu Chiu-wah	1,114	38.44	−21.34
Nonpartisan	Liu Sui-chung	429	14.80	
Majority		241	8.32	
Nonpartisan gain from DAB		Swing		

North District Council Election, 2003: Fung Tsui
Party	Candidate	Votes	%	±%
DAB	Liu Chiu-wah	1,504	59.78	−1.93
Independent	Fung Ka-koi	1,012	40.22	
Majority		492	19.56	
DAB hold		Swing		

Fung Tsui by-election 2000
Party	Candidate	Votes	%	±%
DAB	Liu Chiu-wah	1,470	61.71	+4.97
Independent	Hau Hing-wing	912	38.29	−4.97
Majority		558	3.48	
DAB hold		Swing		

=== 1990s ===
North District Council Election, 1999: Fung Tsui
Party	Candidate	Votes	%	±%
Nonpartisan	Liu Chiu-wah	1,052	56.74	
Independent	Hau Hing-wing	802	43.26	
Majority		250	3.48	
Nonpartisan win (new seat)				
