= Shui Tsan Tin =

Village in Hong Kong

Coordinates: 22.426106°N 114.082825°E

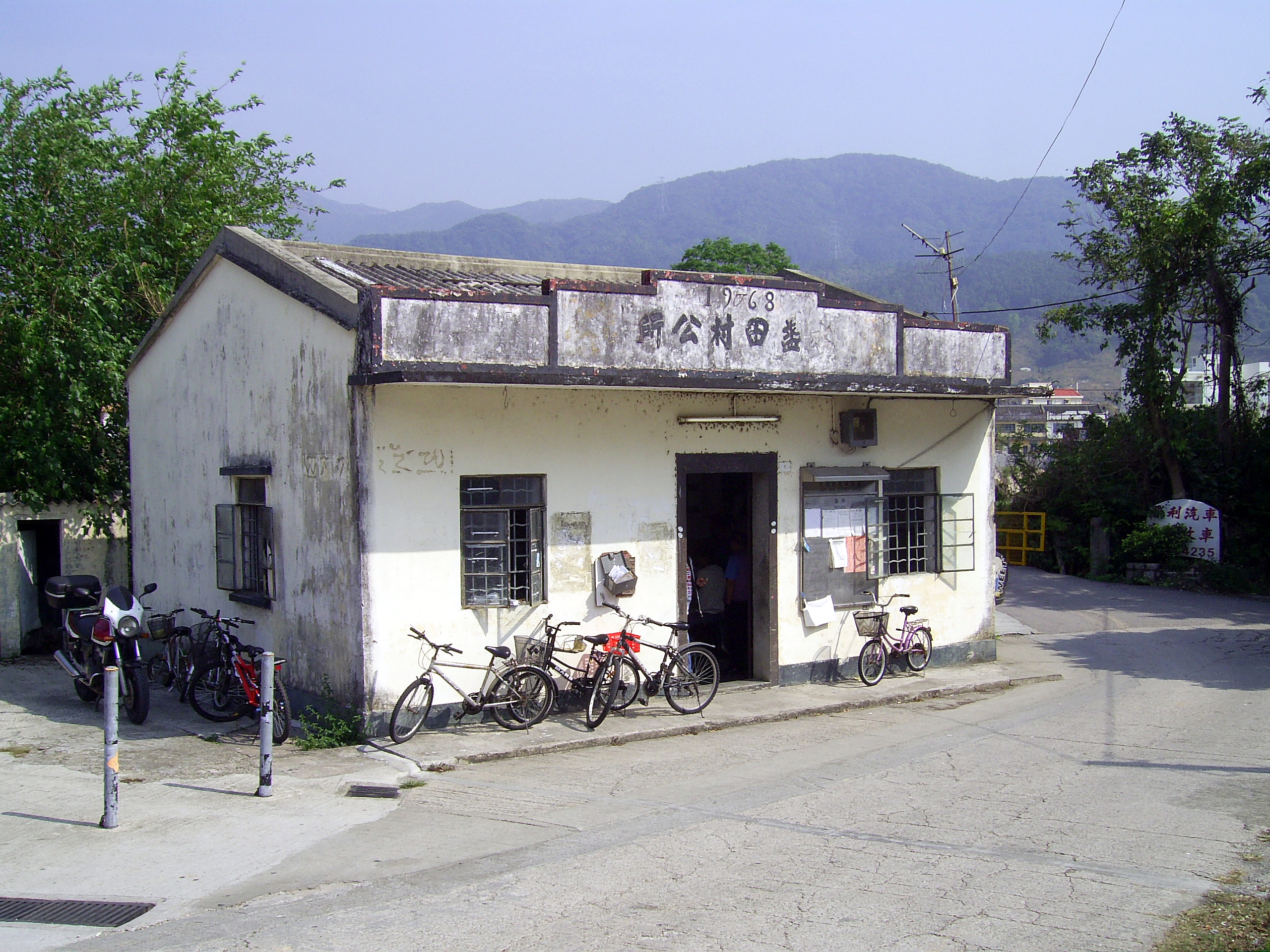
Shui Tsan Tin Village Office.

Shui Tsan Tin (Chinese: 水盞田) is a village in Pat Heung, Yuen Long District, Hong Kong.

== Administration ==
Shui Tsan Tin is a recognized village under the New Territories Small House Policy.
