= Nanshan Museum =

- 南山博物馆
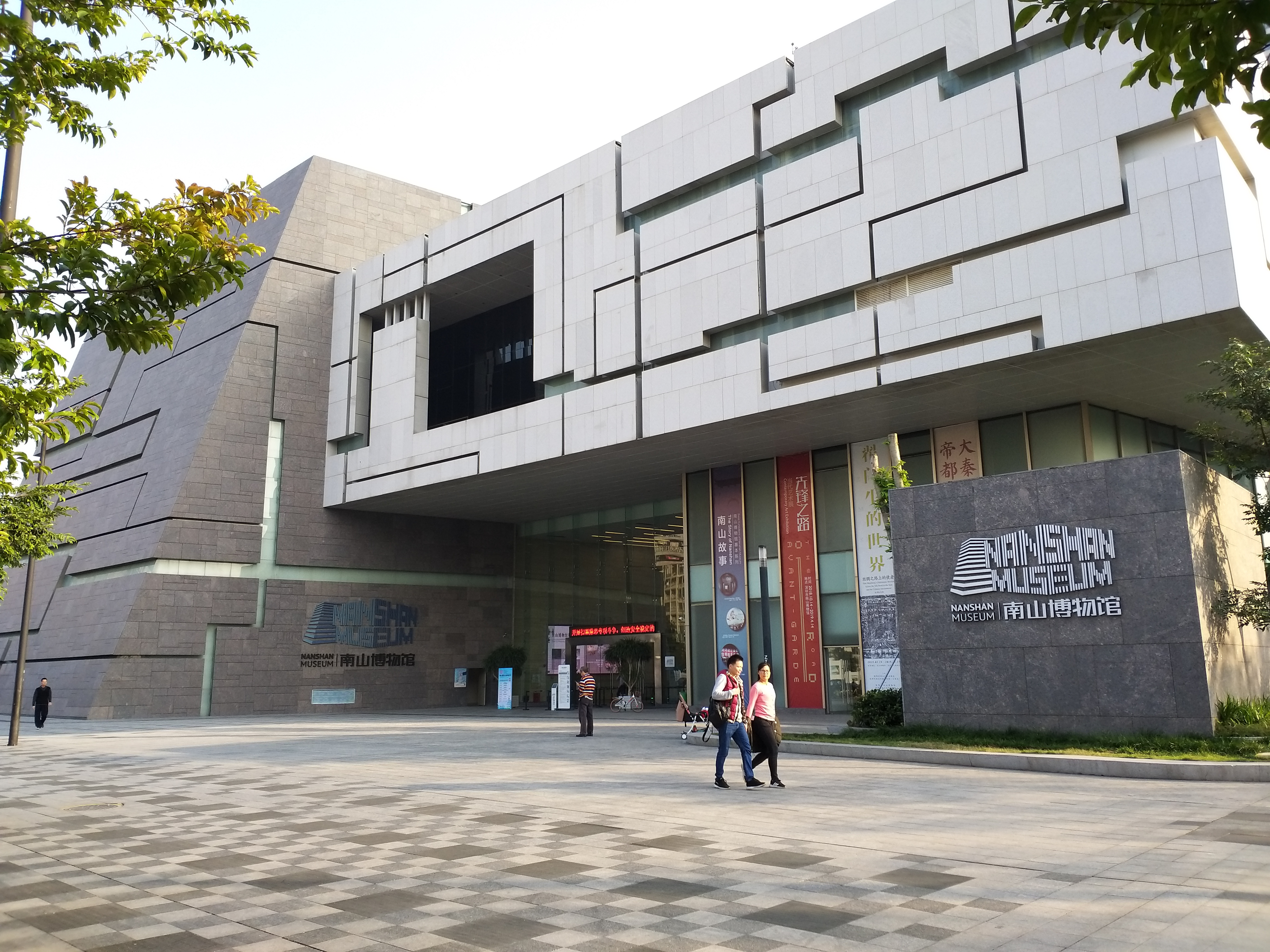
- Established: January 31, 2018
- Location: No. 2093, Nanshan Avenue, Nantou Subdistrict, Nanshan District, Shenzhen, Guangdong Province, China
- Coordinates: 22°32′17″N 113°55′08″E
- Type: Museum
- Director: Qi Xin
- Website: www.nanshanmuseum.com/

Nanshan Museum is a museum in Shenzhen, China, officially opened to the public on January 31, 2018. It is located at No. 2093, Nanshan Avenue, Nantou Subdistrict, Nanshan District, Shenzhen, Guangdong Province, and is a regional museum managed by the Culture, Radio, Television, Tourism and Sports Bureau of Nanshan District. It cost a total of 200 million RMB to construct.

Nanshan Museum mainly introduces the history of Nanshan District to Shenzhen citizens and tourists, and is also responsible for local historical and cultural research, including the collection and research of unearthed cultural relics in the Nanshan area. The museum covers an area of about 20,000 square meters, with a building area of about 36,000 square meters.

== History ==
Construction began in early 2007 under the name Nanshan Art Expo Museum. The authorities initially planned it as an art exhibition hall and studio focusing on the display and collection of shadow puppetry, comics, and sculptures, with an anticipated completion by the end of 2008. By the end of 2010, the local government decided to rename the still-under-construction Nanshan Art Expo Museum to Nanshan Museum, changing its function to a regional comprehensive museum with an emphasis on local history.

In 2012, the main building structure was completed, and it was originally scheduled to open by the end of 2015. However, due to an undecided interior design plan, construction was halted, causing significant further delays to the opening.

In 2017, the museum was first opened for trial operations as a sub-venue for Shenzhen Design Week. That same year, the museum established its first board of directors, which included Wang Shi, former chairman of Vanke, and Joseph Ting Sun-pao, the first director of the Hong Kong Museum of History.

On January 31, 2018, the museum officially opened to the public.

=== Branches ===
Nanshan Museum manages five historical buildings:

- Nantou Ancient City Museum
- Micro-museum cluster in Nantou Ancient City
- Tianhou Museum (at Chiwan Tianhou Palace)
- Chen Yu's Former Residence Memorial Hall
- Song Shaodi's Tomb

== Exhibitions ==
Nanshan Museum has 3 permanent exhibition halls and 3 special exhibition halls.

=== Permanent exhibitions ===
The total area of the permanent exhibitions at Nanshan Museum is 3,761 square meters.

- Ancient Nanshan

Located on the third floor, the exhibition covers the history of Nanshan District from local ancient sites such as Wubeiling and Dieshishan up to the Battle of Tuen Mun.

- Modern Nanshan

Located on the third floor, the exhibition covers the Opium Wars, the Second Sino-Japanese War, the liberation of Nei Lingding Island, the Shekou escape, as well as traditional Nanshan folk customs and local agricultural and aquaculture industries.

- Nanshan Reform and Opening-up History

Located on the fourth floor, the exhibition covers the history of Nanshan District from 1979 to the present, including the "First Cannon Shot at Shekou", the history of the founding of Shenzhen University, and the story of Yuan Geng.

=== Special exhibitions ===
The total area of the special exhibition halls is 3,267 square meters. By the end of 2019, Nanshan Museum had spent 22.337 million RMB to organize 18 special exhibitions.

- Collaborative Exhibitions

"Mediterranean Colors: The Civilization and Fantasy of an Ancient City", "Treasures from the National Museum of Afghanistan", "Elephant in the Central Plains: The Light of Ancient Henan Civilization", "Eternal Chang'an: Shaanxi Tang Dynasty Cultural Relics Exhibition", "National Library Collection of the Yongle Encyclopedia Exhibition"

- In-house Exhibitions

"Glory of Ancient Yue: Bronze Ware of the Ancient Yue People", "Pioneer Road: Contemporary Art Exhibition", "Returning · Silk Road Ceramics: Exhibition of Returned Ming and Qing Export Porcelain", "Seven Hundred Years of the Zeng State: Excavated Bronzeware of Zeng Marquises", "Thin Glaze, Light Stain: Exhibition of Chen Yanglong's Underglaze Multicolored Ceramic Techniques from Liling"

== Collection ==
Since 2013, Nanshan Museum has been collecting artifacts from the public. Additionally, the museum has transferred a number of unearthed cultural relics excavated by the Shenzhen Museum and archaeological institutes within the Nanshan District area. As of June 2018, the collection included 5,994 artifacts, among them over 420 pieces of ancient bronzeware.

=== Important artifacts ===
- Boot-shaped bronze yue with a design of a feather-adorned figure and boat race (Warring States period)
- Hanyang ge dagger-axe (Warring States period)
- Bronze bucket with lid and feather-adorned figure design (Western Han)
- Engraved pottery brick with the multiplication table (Eastern Han)

== Visitor information ==
=== Transportation ===
- Shenzhen Metro Taoyuan Station Exit B

=== Opening hours ===
- Tuesday to Sunday: 10:00-18:00 (last entry at 17:30)
- Saturday Night Opening: 18:00-21:00 (last entry and disinfection at 20:30)
- Closed on Mondays (except national statutory holidays)
