= San yan chong =

Ming dynasty three barrel hand cannon

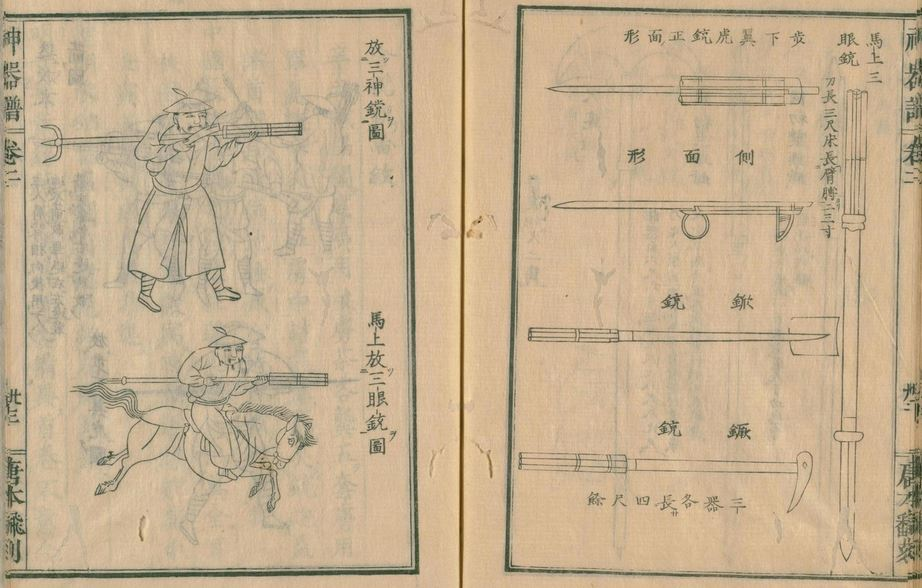
A san yan chong doubling as a polearm and cavalry weapon illustrated in the Shenqi Pu

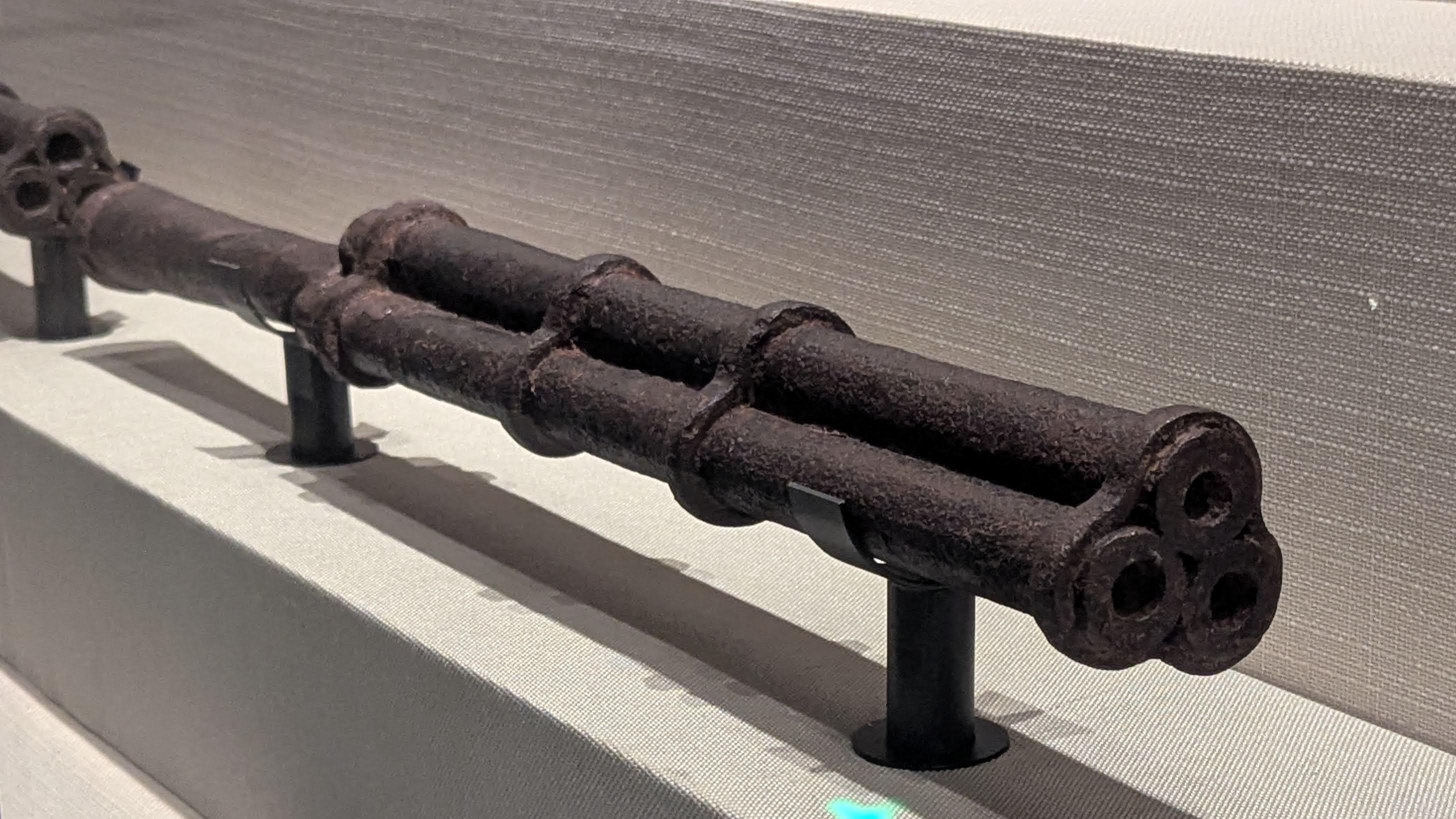
A san yan chong on display at the Nanshan Museum, Shenzhen

The san yan chong (simplified Chinese: 三眼铳; traditional Chinese: 三眼銃; lit. 'three-eyes gun') was a three barrel hand cannon used in the Ming dynasty.

The distinctive san yan chong, or three eyed gun, was one of the most common Ming hand cannons. Three eyed guns were usually made from cast iron or crude steel, each of the three eyed gun's metal tubes would have a small hole that allows the user to pour in gunpowder. Functionally they were no different from many contemporary European hand cannons—a solid metallic head with an aperture behind it for different tail fittings to be attached, ranging from the butt of a staff, a spearhead, to a specialized short curved stock with a raised sight that enabled the gunner to fire it while kneeling—these would be called "Divine Machines."

Historians have attributed their design to be refined from primitive fire lances—which consisted of bundles of single joint of bamboos tied around a spear. As time progressed though, metal barrels appeared during the 12th century, and could not only shoot out spouts of flames like a small flame thrower but they could also fire porcelain shards or metal scraps as shrapnel. The three headed gun would standardize the rounds and became the next evolution of the fire lance—on top of standardizing the rounds, which ranged from rounds of steel balls to shrapnel, to rough iron sand.

Though they the three eyed guns and all of its variants were developed roughly in tandem with contemporary European hand guns, even after superior European guns were introduced to China via Portuguese merchants in the 16th century the Ming still fielded them in the tens of thousands to work in conjunction with whole new divisions fully equipped with western muskets.

As the Ming dynasty neared its collapse, the production and deployment of these multi-barrelled guns actually rose drastically against the rising Manchu threat.
