= Fenghuang Village =

Urban village in Shenzhen, China

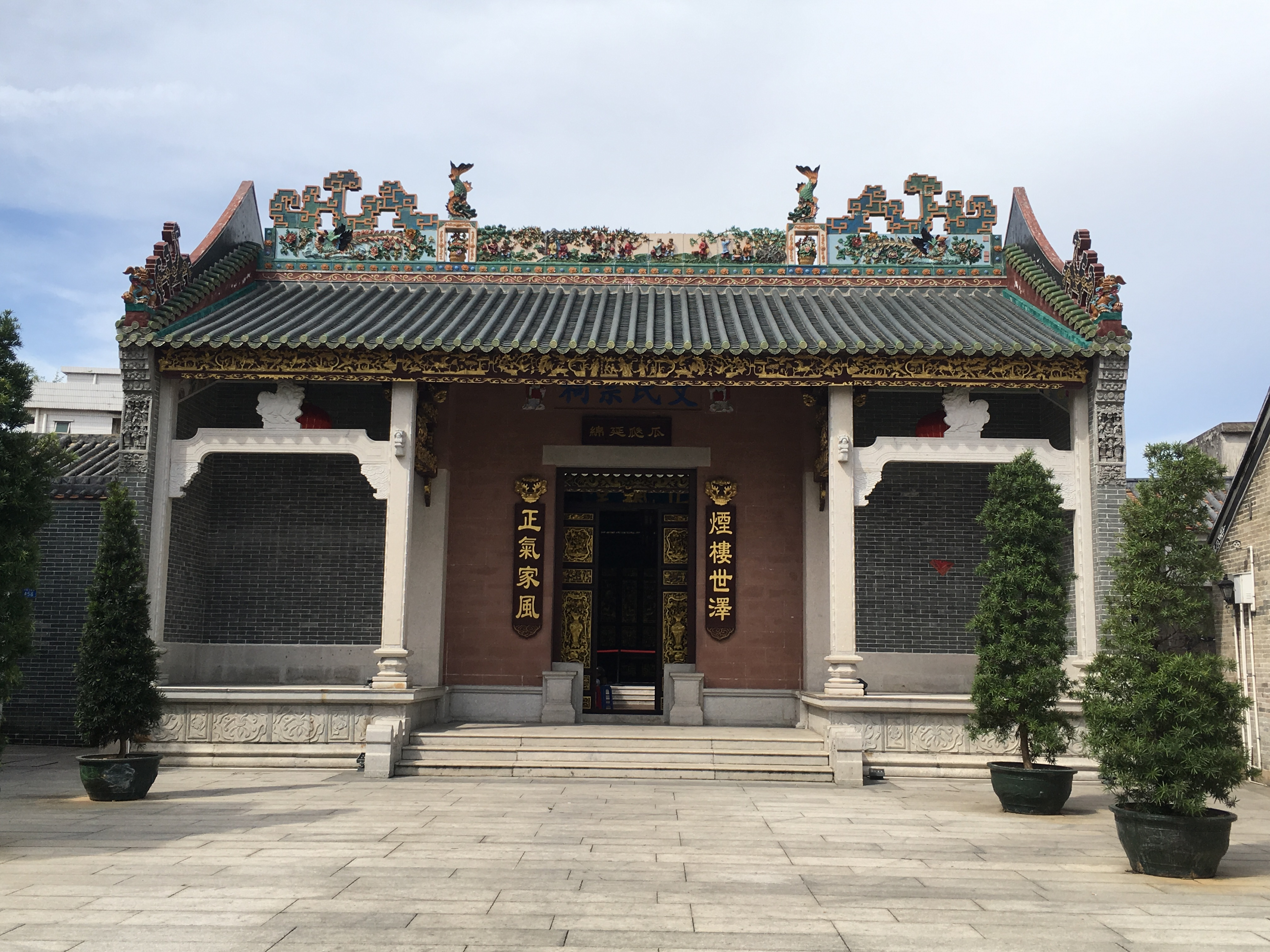
Wen Ancestral Hall in Fenghuang Village

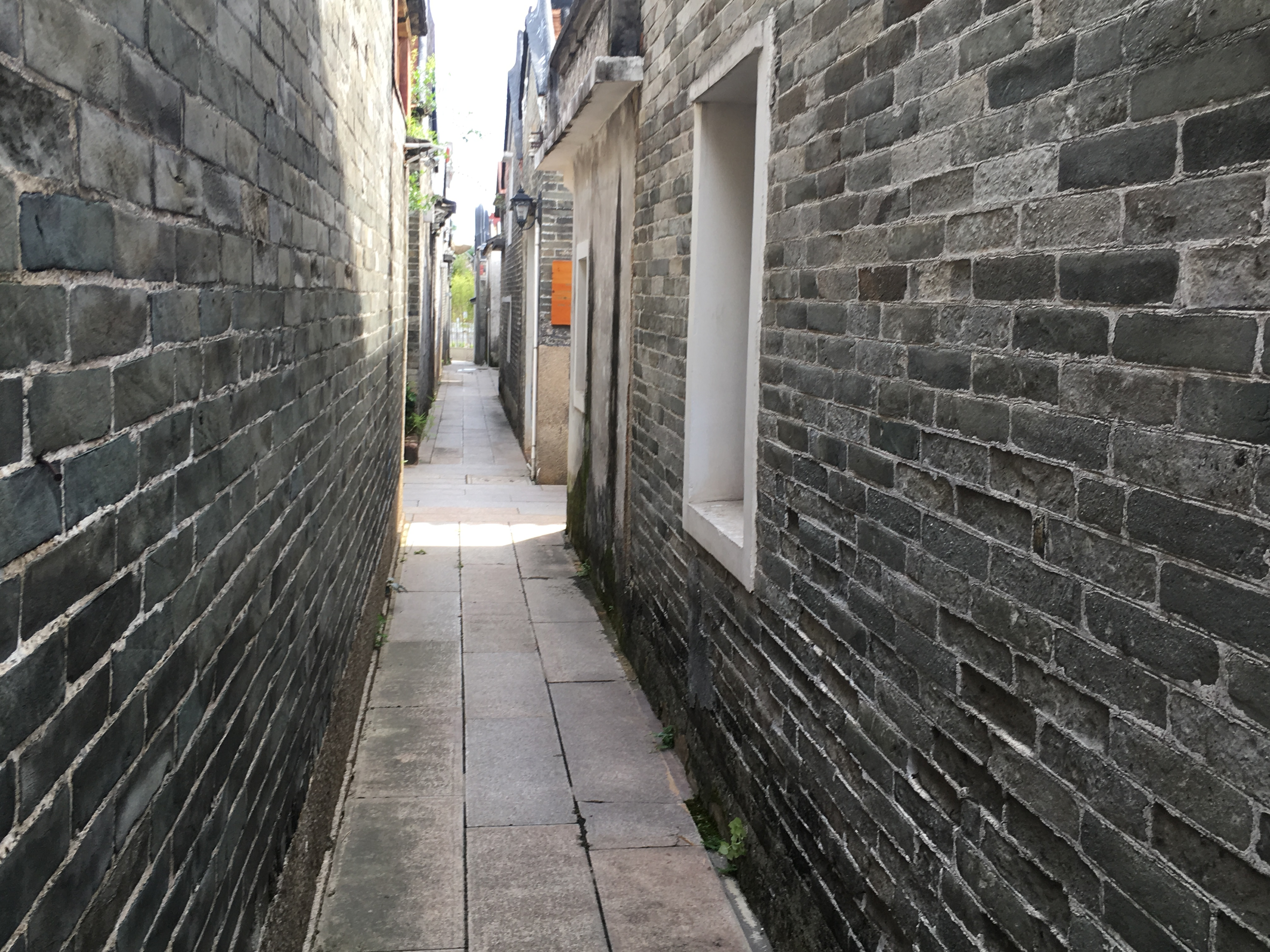
A restored alley within the village

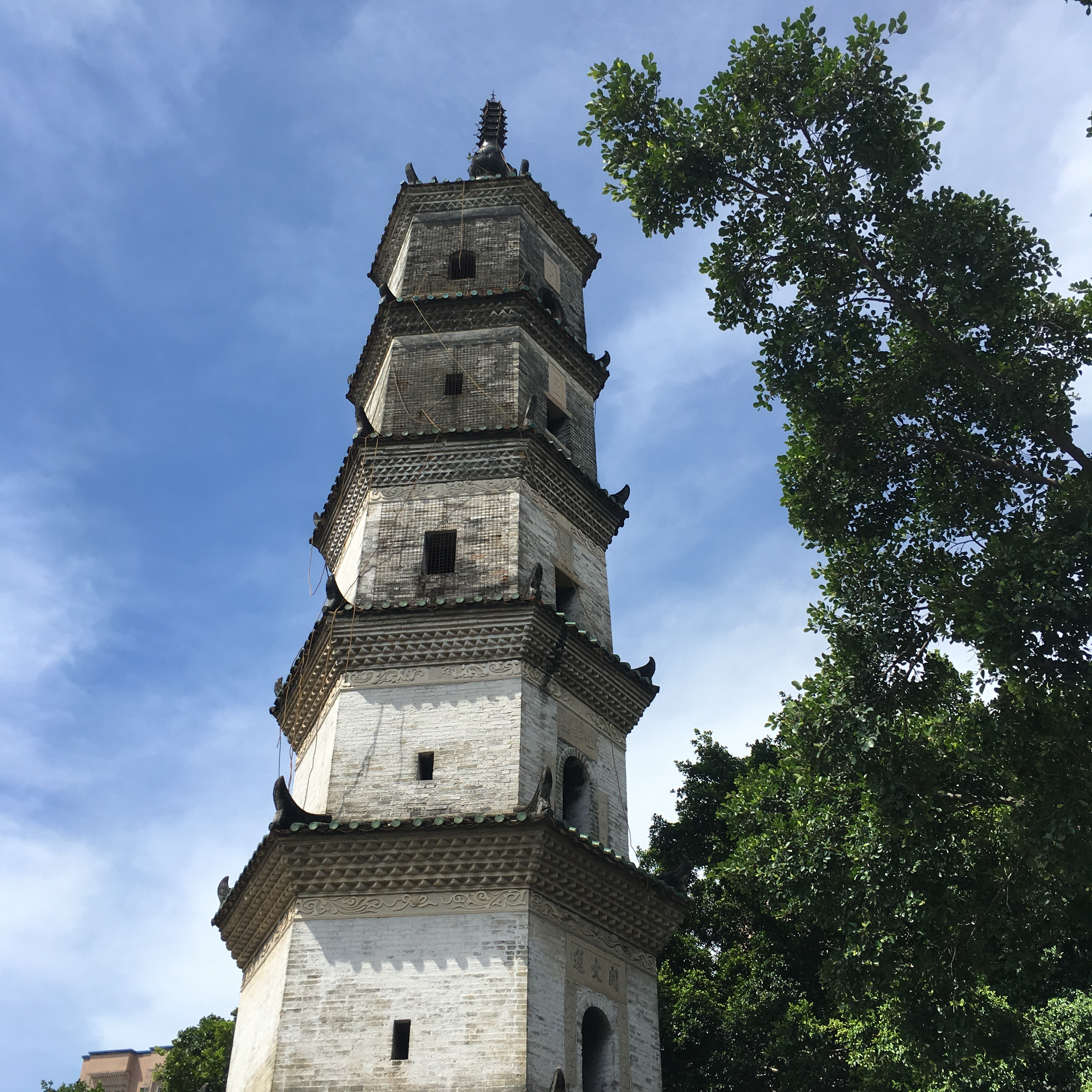
Wen Tower

Fenghuang Village (Chinese: 凤凰村), also known as Ling Xia (岭下) or Fenghuang Ancient Village (凤凰古村), is a historic urban village in Fuyong, Bao'an, Shenzhen, China.

The village was founded by the descendants Wen Tianxiang, a scholar-general in the Southern Song dynasty in the Yuan dynasty. There are currently more than 60 Ming and Qing dynasty buildings and structures remaining in the village, including the 6-storey Wen Tower, which was constructed in the late 18th century. The village was listed in Shenzhen's Heritage List in 2006 and restored in 2014.

== See also ==
- Dapeng Fortress
- Nantou
- Fenghuangshan Forest Park, a mountain nearby
