= Nantou Ancient City Museum =

Museum in Shenzhen, Guangdong, China

- 南头古城博物馆
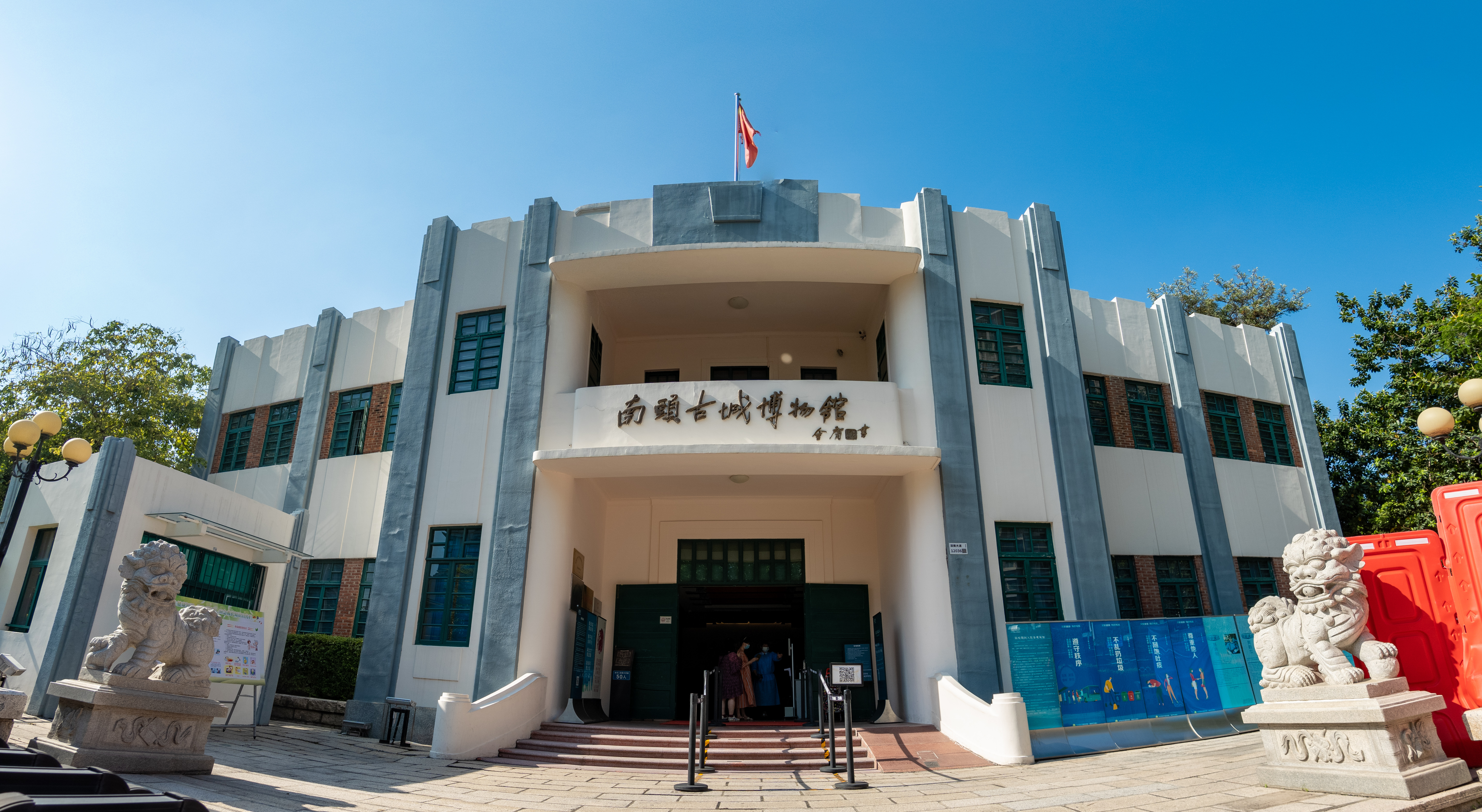
- Location: Nanshan District, Shenzhen, Guangdong, China
- Coordinates: 22.540866°N 113.920012°E

Nantou Ancient City Museum (Chinese: 南头古城博物馆) is a museum in Nantou, Nanshan District, Shenzhen, Guangdong, China. Built within the former government house of Bao'an County, the museum has two stories and three halls, displaying historical artifacts across the former county. The museum was opened in September 2004.

== Gallery ==
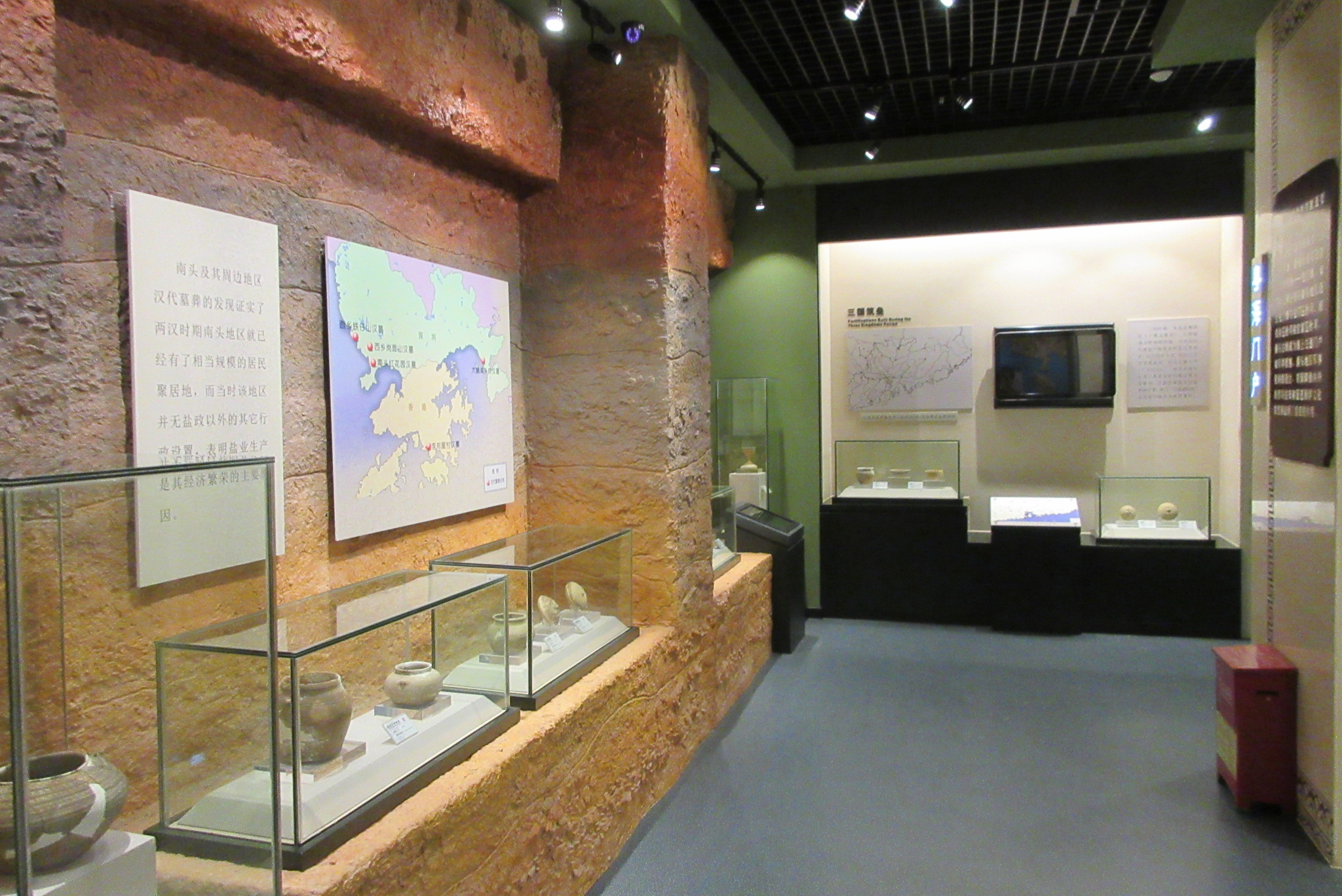
Nantou Ancient old city Museum interior

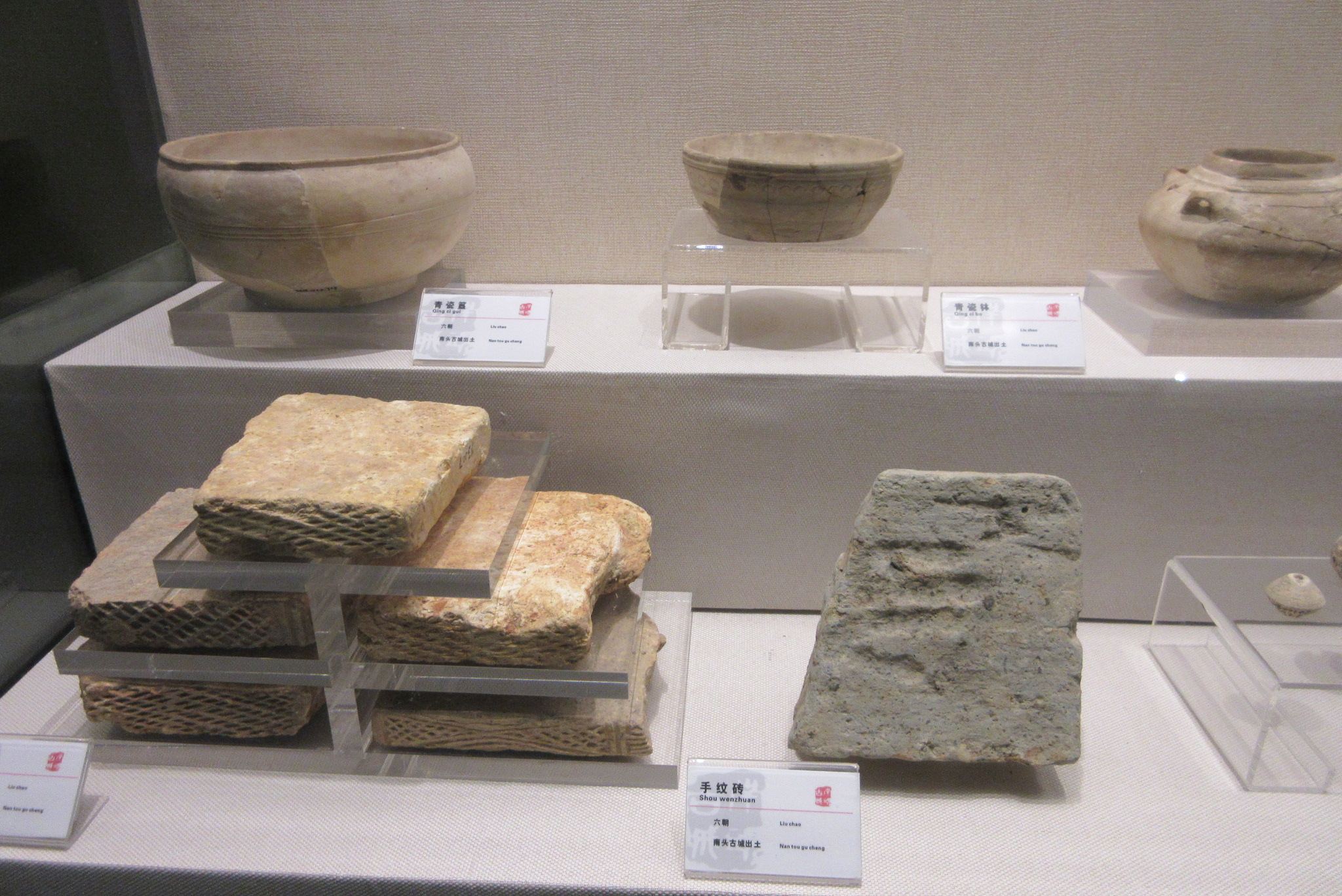
exhibits stone bricks

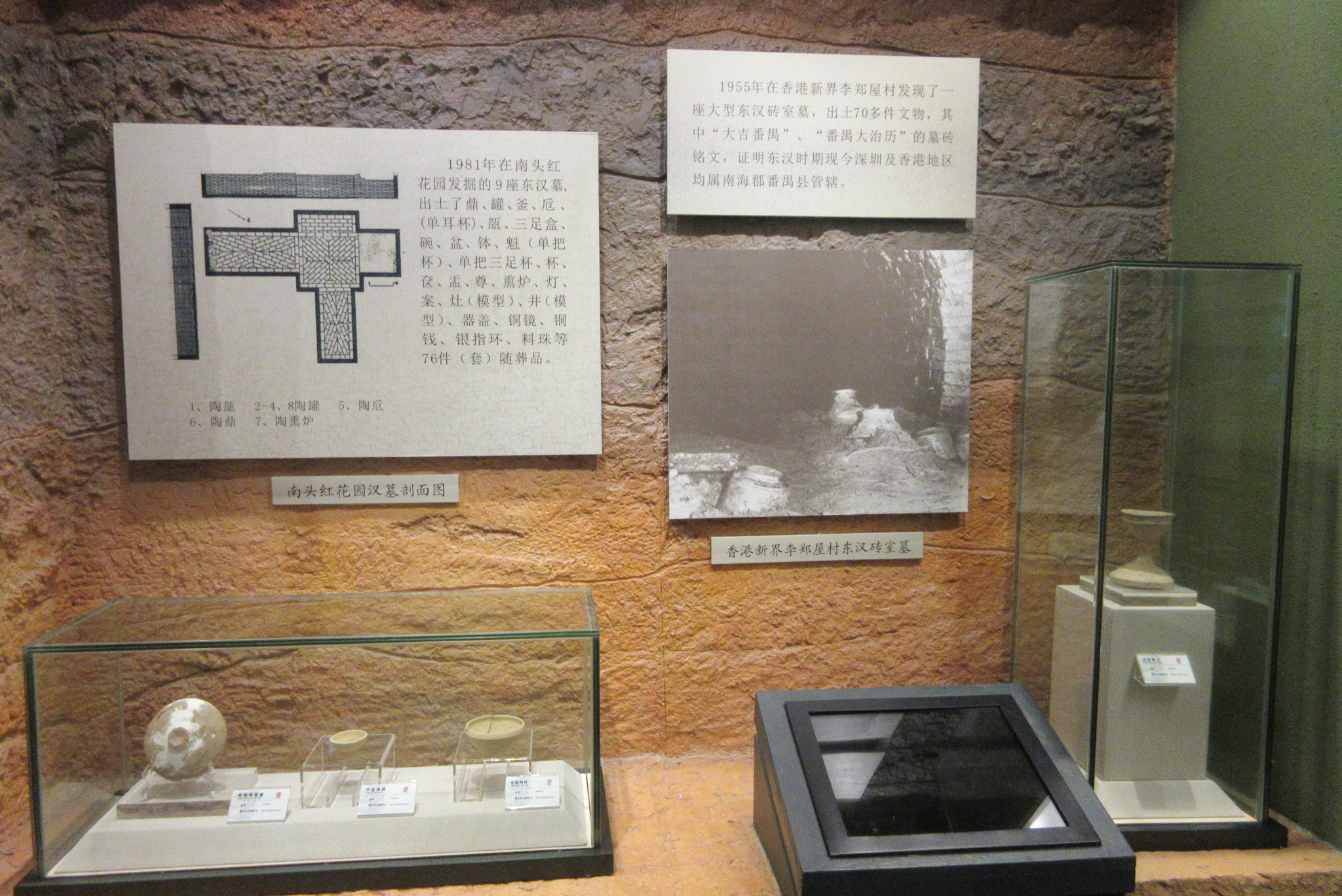
exhibits and maps

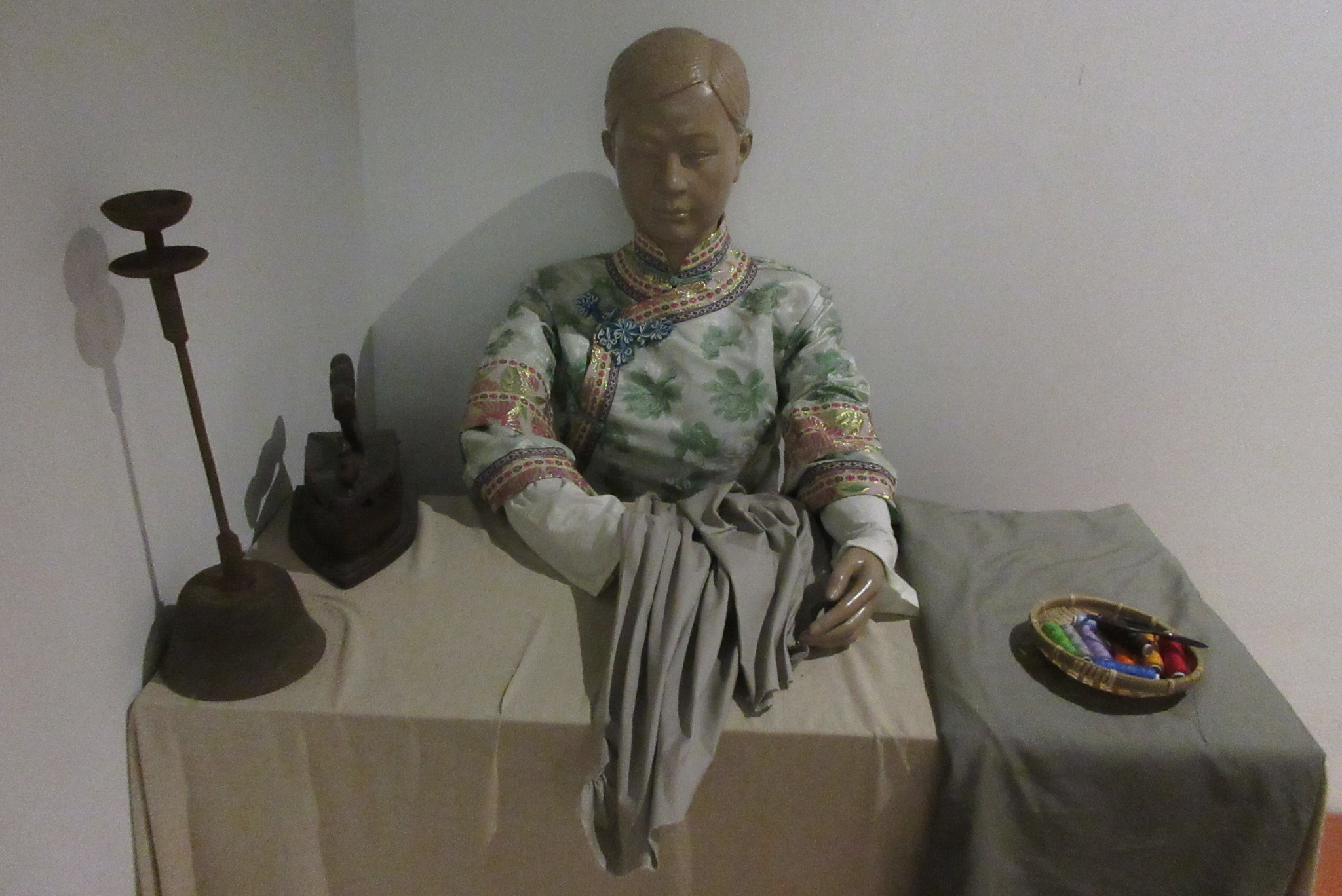
shop keeper tailor and customer

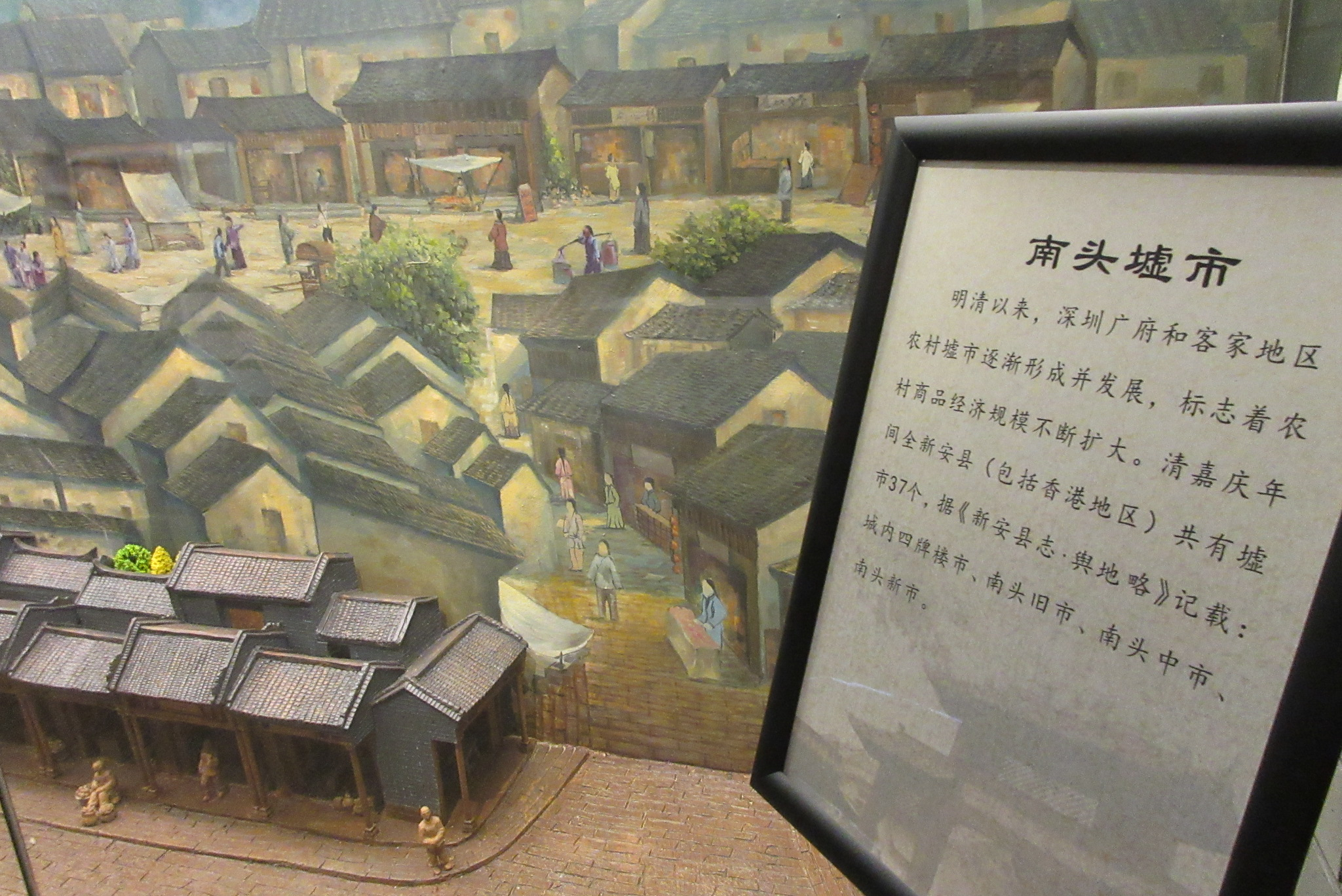
village and wai market

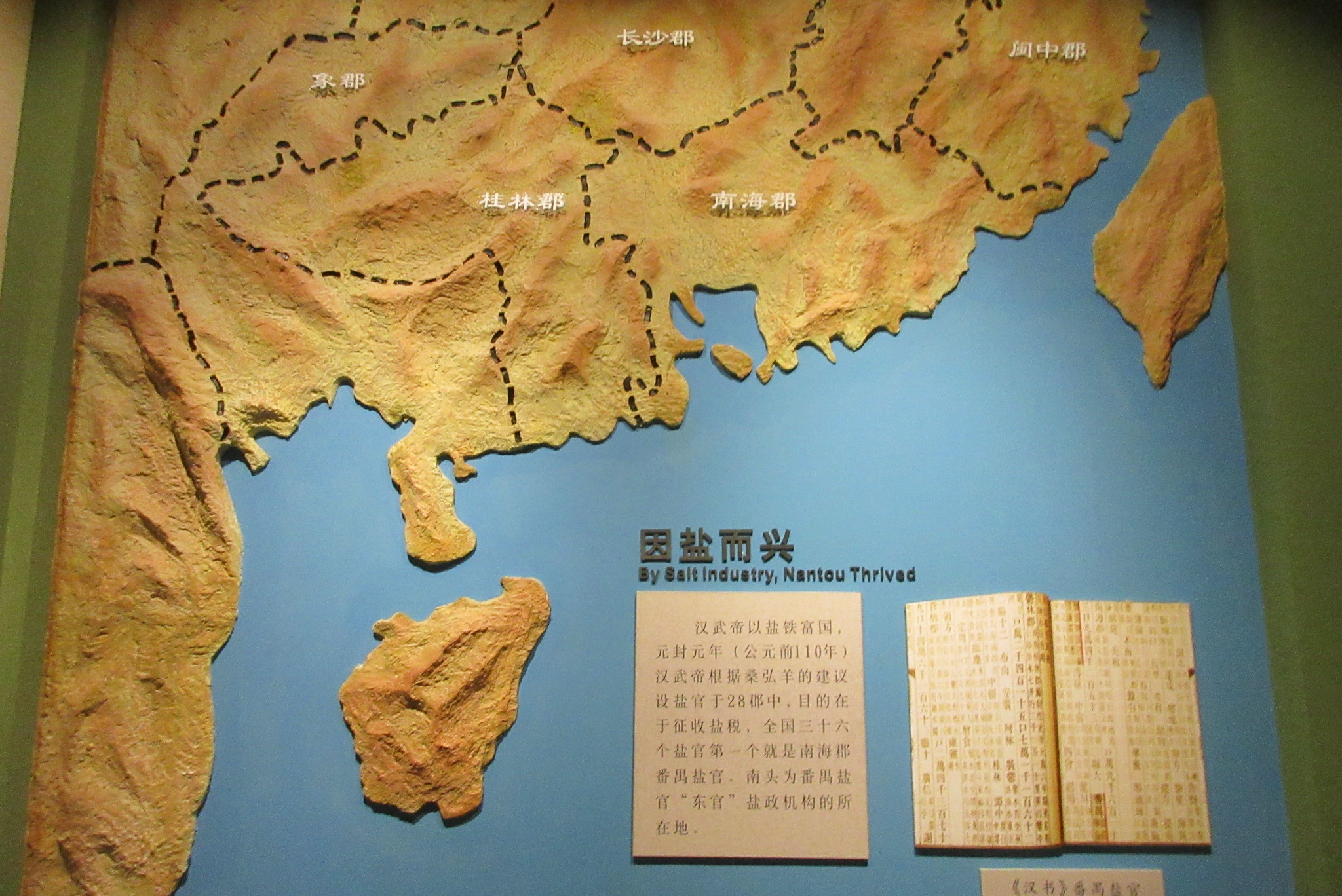
maps of the Nantou ancient city

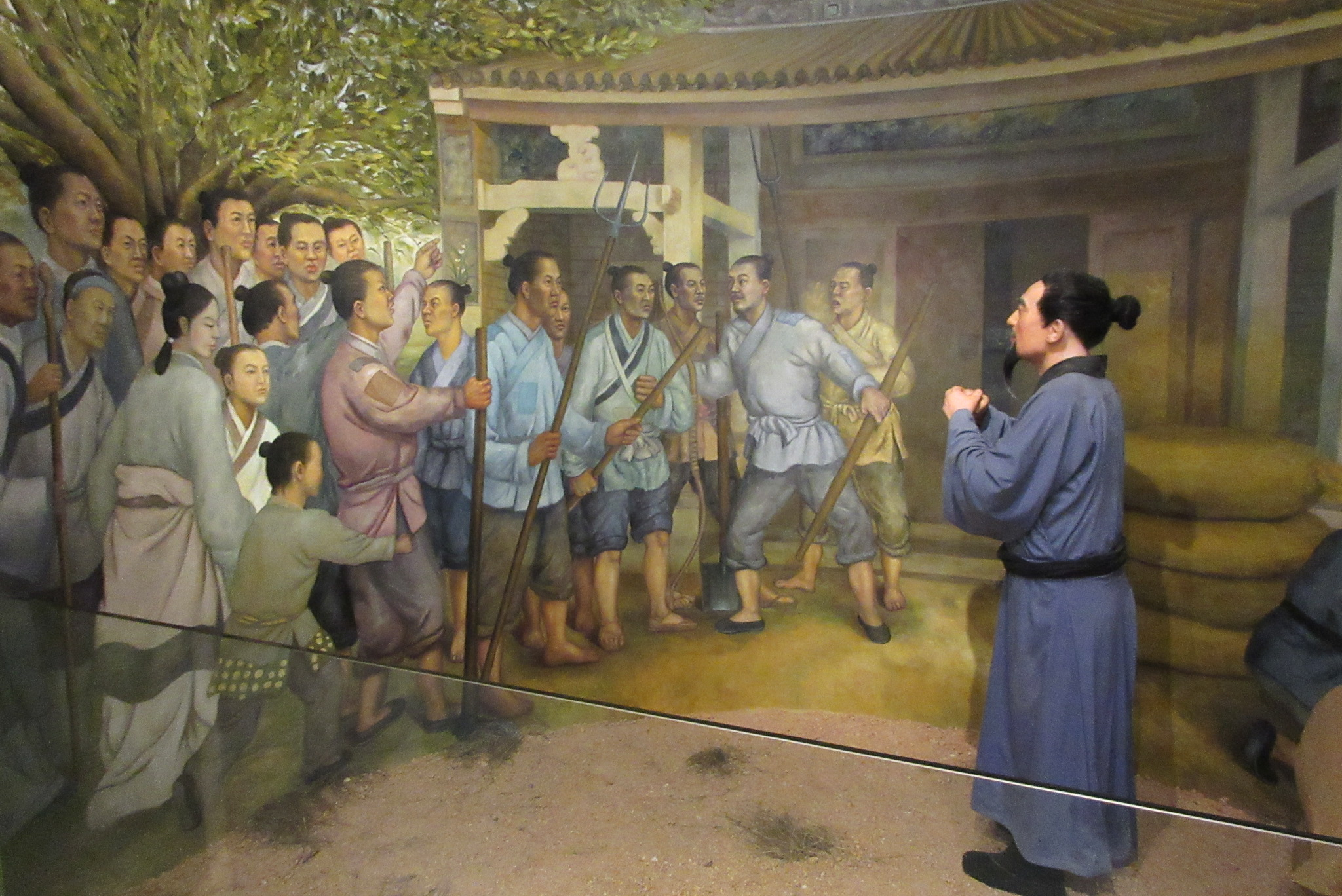
history story of the Nantou ancient city
