= Gazetteer of Xin'an County =

- Traditional Chinese: 新安縣志
- Simplified Chinese: 新安县志
Transcriptions
Standard Mandarin
- Hanyu Pinyin: Xīn'ān Xiànzhì
- Wade–Giles: Hsin-an hsien chih
Yue: Cantonese
- Yale Romanization: sānōn yuhn ji
- Jyutping: san1 on1 jyn6 zi3

A handwritten copy of 1587 version with map. The upper and lower parts of the map shows former locations of Shenzhen and Hong Kong respectively.

Xin'an Xianzhi (Chinese: 新安縣志; literally Gazetteers of Xin'an County), also known as San On County Gazetteer or San On Gazetteer in English, were the chorography of the historical Xin'an County (San-On or Sun-On County; literally New Peace County; known at times as the Po-On County (spelt Bao'an in pinyin)) of Guangdong (then Kwangtung) in southern China. Due to frequent geopolitical changes, the county ceased to exist and became the history and territories of Hong Kong and Shenzhen, metropolises in South China. Versions of the gazetteer are very important records to study in the area.

Six editions were published, the first one in 1587 and the last one in 1819. The last editions were Qing's Kangxi Years (K'ang-hsi; 1661–1722) edition and Jiaqing Years (Chia-ch'ing; 1796–1820) edition.

== See also ==
- Gazetteer
