= Li Ying College =

First recorded academy in Imperial Hong Kong

Coordinates: 22.4619°N 114.0780°E

- Present day Kam Tin, Hong Kong

Information
- Type: Chinese Imperial
- Established: circa 1075 AD
- Head of school: Tang Fu Hsieh

Li Ying College
- Traditional Chinese: 力瀛書院
Transcriptions
Standard Mandarin
- Hanyu Pinyin: Lì Yíng Shū Yuàn
Yue: Cantonese
- Yale Romanization: Lihk yìhng syū yuhn
- Jyutping: Lik6 jing4 syu1 jyun6

Li-Ying College was the first recorded academy in Imperial Hong Kong. It was founded circa 1075 AD during the Song dynasty (960–1279).

== History ==
The school's founder, Deng Fuxie (Cantonese: Tang Fu Heep), was a native of Jiangsu province in mainland China. The school was located in the area known today as Kai Kung Leng (雞公嶺) Kam Tin, New Territories, Hong Kong. The academy was well known for its large library of Chinese classics. In imperial times, academies were designed with a strong emphasis on the imperial examination system used to prepare scholar-officials for government work. By the time of the Qing dynasty (1644–1911), the Chinese government in 1662 and 1664 closed down schools as a strategy to counter Ming dynasty (1368–1644) loyalists. The academy was in ruins by the early 19th century.

== Notable alumni ==
- 1259 – The first jìnshì (进士) degree under the imperial examination system was granted to "Huang Shih".
- 1685 – A descendant of the founder, "Tang Wen Wei" was granted a jìnshì degree and was appointed district magistracy in Zhejiang.
- 1754 – Chiang Shih Yuan from the Tai Po District earned a jìnshì degree and became well known for his literary accomplishments in southern China.
- 1789 – Tang Ying Yuen (Tang Kuen Hin), a well-known local calligrapher, passed his military examination. He later built the "So Lay Yuen Study Hall" at "Shui Tau Tsuen" in Kam Tin.

== See also ==
- History of education in China
- Imperial Hong Kong
- List of the oldest schools in the world
