= Wang Shi =

Wang Shi may refer to:

- Wang Shi (Tang dynasty) (fl. 9th century), Chinese official and general of the Tang Dynasty
- Wang Shi (entrepreneur) (born 1951), Chinese businessman
- Wang Shi (fencer), Chinese fencer
