= Bao'an County =

Historical county in South China

Bao'an County 寶安縣
- County of China
- 331–1979
- Location of modern Shenzhen within Guangdong (in purple).
- Capital: Nantou
- History
  - Established: 331
  - Separation from Dongguan County: 1573
  - Detachment of Hong Kong: 29 August 1842
  - Renamed to Shenzhen: 23 January 1979
  - Bao'an District established: 1 January 1993
Succeeded by
| Tamão |
| British Hong Kong |
| Dongguan |
| Shenzhen |
- Today part of: People's Republic of China (Mainland): Guangdong; Dongguan City; Shenzhen City; Zhuhai City; Hong Kong

Bao'an County
- Traditional Chinese: 寶安縣
- Simplified Chinese: 宝安县
- Postal: Poon County
Transcriptions
Standard Mandarin
- Hanyu Pinyin: Bǎo'ān Xiàn
- Wade–Giles: Pao^{3}-an^{1} Hsien^{4}
Hakka
- Romanization: Bau^{3}on^{1} Hien^{4}
Yue: Cantonese
- Yale Romanization: Bóu ōn yuhn
- Jyutping: Bou^{2} on^{1} jyun^{6}

Xin'an County
- Traditional Chinese: 新安縣
- Simplified Chinese: 新安县
- Postal: Sunon County
- Literal meaning: New peace
Transcriptions
Standard Mandarin
- Hanyu Pinyin: Xīn'ān Xiàn
- Wade–Giles: Hsin^{1}-an^{1} Hsien^{4}
Hakka
- Romanization: Sin^{1}on^{1} Hien^{4}
Yue: Cantonese
- Yale Romanization: San^{1} on^{1} jyun^{6}
- Jyutping: Sān ōn yuhn

Bao'an County, formerly named Xin'an County, was a historical county in South China. It roughly follows the administrative boundaries of modern-day Hong Kong and the city of Shenzhen. For most of its history, the administrative center of the county was in Nantou.

== History ==
During the Three Kingdoms, the later Bao'an County, along with Dongguan and Boluo counties, formed a single large district with the name Boluo (simplified Chinese: 博罗; traditional Chinese: 博羅).

In 331, the Eastern Jin dynasty established Bao'an County, one of six counties under Dōngguān (东官; 東官) Prefecture. This prefecture's area included modern Shenzhen and Dongguan. In the second year of the Zhide of Suzong under the Tang dynasty (757 AD), Dōngguān was renamed to Dōngguǎn (simplified Chinese: 东莞; traditional Chinese: 東莞).

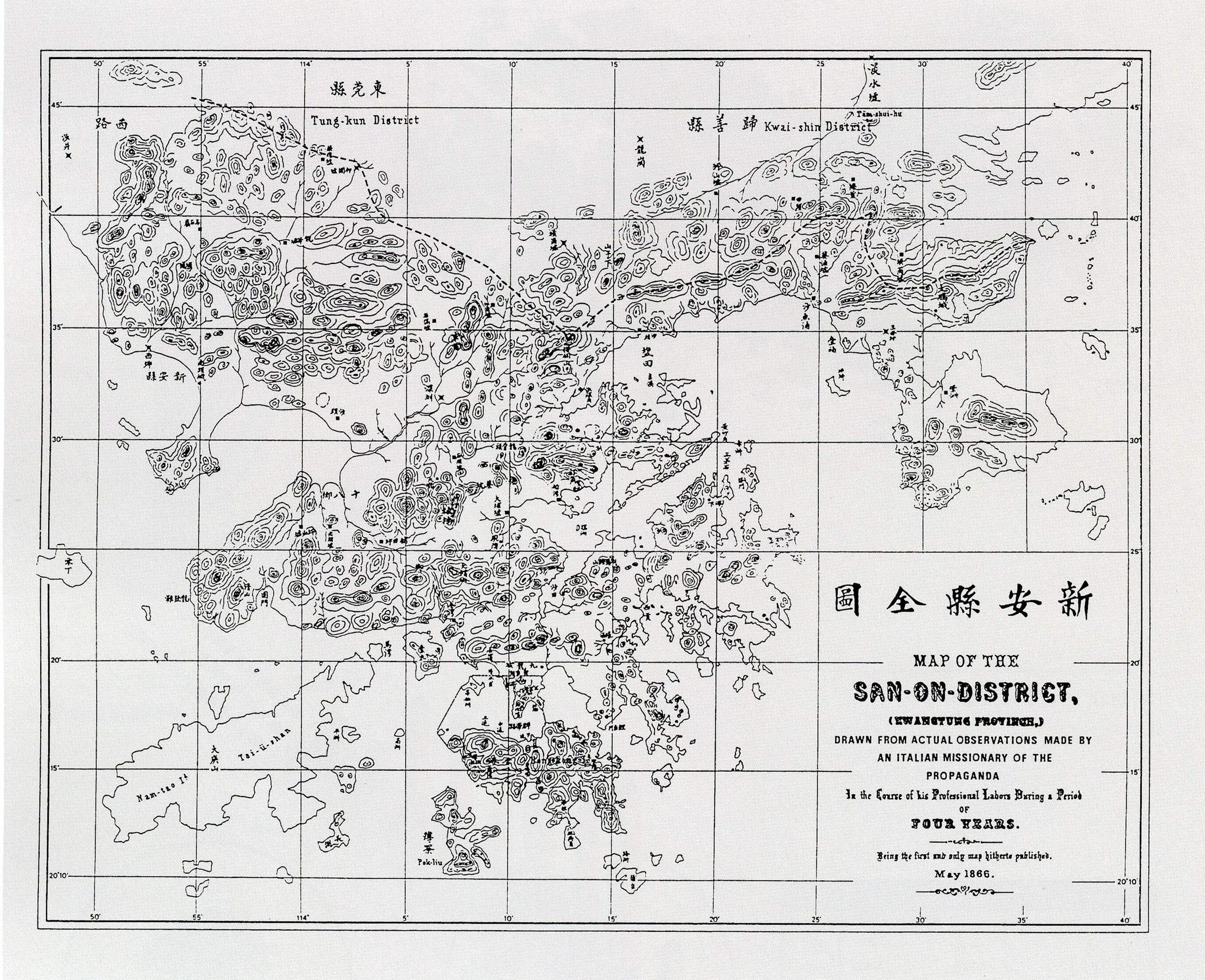
Map of San-On District, drawn from the observations made by the Italian missionary Simeone Volonteri, and published in 1866.

In the 27th year of Hongwu Emperor's (1368–1399, founder of the Ming dynasty) reign, Hongwu appointed an officer with the title Shou-yu-suo (Chinese: 守御所; lit. 'Protector of the region') to protect the local population from robbers and vagabonds which increasingly infested the district.

In 1573, the first year of the reign of Wanli of the Ming dynasty, Xin'an County (sometimes referred to as district) was established as a separate administrative division of Guangzhou Prefecture. The area was then separated from the old Dongguan County due to military reasons.

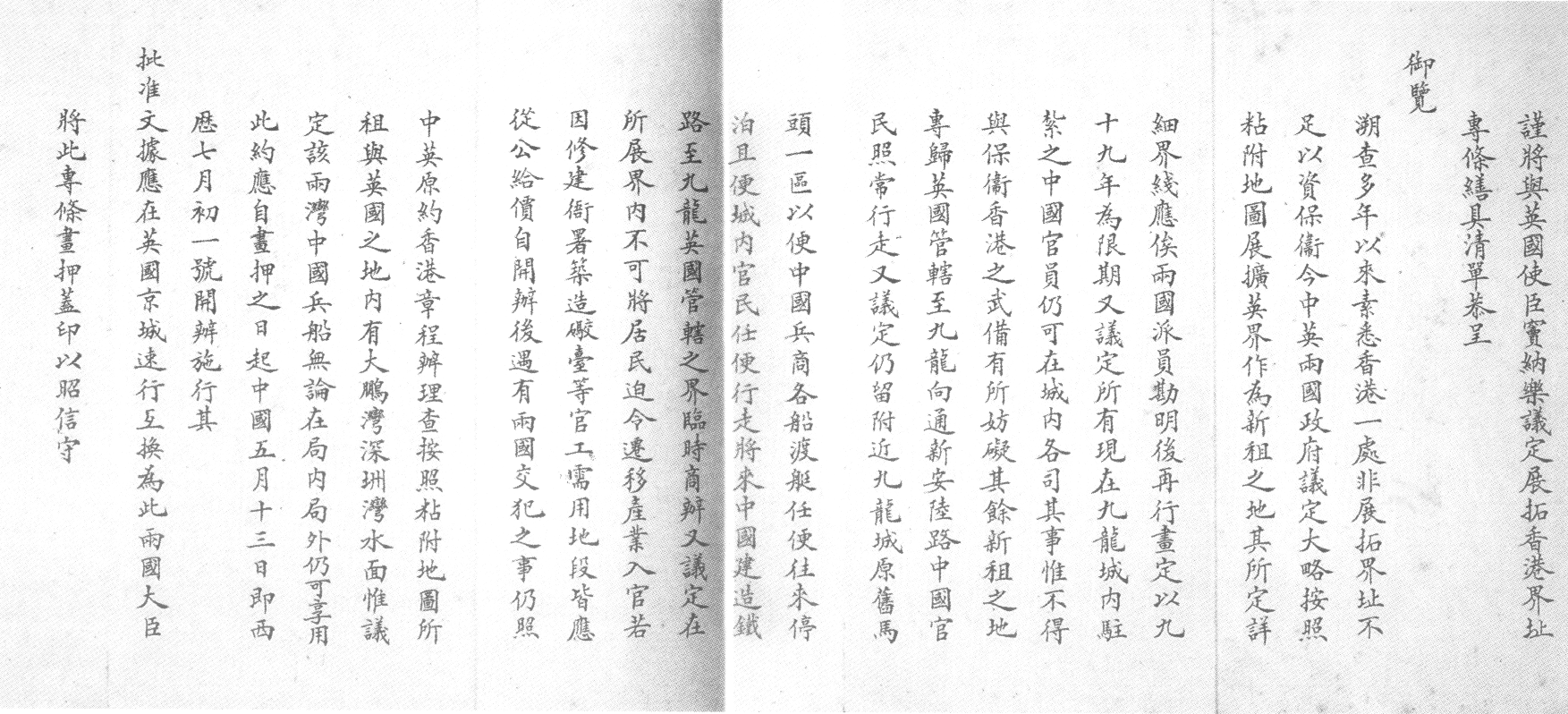
Convention for the Extension of Hong Kong Territory, an unequal treaty signed between Qing China and the United Kingdom in 1898, shows that south of the Sham Chun River of Xin'an County was leased out to British government.

Under the Qing dynasty, Xin'an County was one of the fourteen districts under the department of Guangdong. During the Great Clearance (1661–1669), most of Xin'an County was affected by the coastal evacuation. However Xin'an ceased to be a separate administrative county by the 5th year of Kangxi (1666), and the areas not affected by the evacuation were temporarily absorbed into the adjoining Dongguan County until the lift of the ban in 1669. From 1842 to 1898, 1055.61 km^{2} out of 3076 km^{2} of Xin'an County was ceded to the United Kingdom to form Hong Kong.

=== Population ===
According to the 1819 edition of the Gazetteer of Xin'an County, the population of Xin'an County was about 18,000 people in 1642, just prior to the collapse of the Ming dynasty, and the total population was about 4,000 by 1672, three years after the reoccupation of the area at the end of the Great Clearance.

=== Cession of Hong Kong ===
The area commonly referred to as Hong Kong was successively ceded or leased from the county to Britain in 1842, 1860 and 1898 under the Treaty of Nanking (Hong Kong Island), Convention of Peking (Kowloon), and Convention for the Extension of Hong Kong Territory (New Territories).

=== Republic of China era ===
In 1914, after a nationwide survey of the names of provinces and cities, Yuan Shikai, the President of the Republic of China, restored the ancient name Bao'an County to avoid having the same name as Xin'an County in Henan Province. During World War II, the county was occupied by Japan and the county seat was moved to Shima Town, Dongguan County. The area from the Guangzhou-Kowloon Railway to the west to the Pearl River, as well as the Shenzhen River and Dapeng Bay were the activity areas of the Dongjiang Column led by the Chinese Communist Party (CCP). On June 30, 1946, after the main force of the Dongjiang Column boarded ships at Shayu Creek (Chinese: 鯊魚溪) and retreated northward to Shandong, where they left behind scattered and hidden personnel to continue their activities under the leadership of Lan Zao, secretary of the Ludong County Committee of the CCP. In spring 1947, the Jiangnan Working Committee of the CCP was established, and the Huiyang-Dongguan-Baoan People's Hometown Defense Corps was founded. Lan Zao was the head and political commissar, and the Pingshan and Dapeng Bay coasts were used as guerrilla bases. In April 1948, the Huiyang-Dongguan-Baoan People's Hometown Guarding Corps was changed into the Jiangnan Detachment of the Guangdong People's Liberation Army's Guangdong-Jiangxi-Hunan Border Column. In January 1949, it was renamed the Dongjiang First Detachment of the Guangdong-Jiangxi-Hunan Border Column of the Chinese People's Liberation Army. On October 19, 1949, the Dongjiang First Detachment entered Nantou, and the PLA officially took over Bao'an County.

=== People's Republic of China era ===
In 1953, Shenzhen replaced Nantou as the administrative centre, due to the increasing prominence of the town as the southern terminus of the Chinese section of the Kowloon–Canton Railway.

In 1979, Bao'an County was renamed Shenzhen City after the name of its county town since 1953, and the southern part of Shenzhen became a Special Economic Zone a year later. A diminished Bao'an County remained in the new city of Shenzhen outside the SEZ until 1992, when it was replaced by the Bao'an and the Longgang districts.

== See also ==
- History of Hong Kong under Imperial China
- Gazetteer of Xin'an County
