= Nantou (historic town) =

Historic town in Shenzhen, Guangdong, China

Coordinates: 22.546307°N 113.916456°E

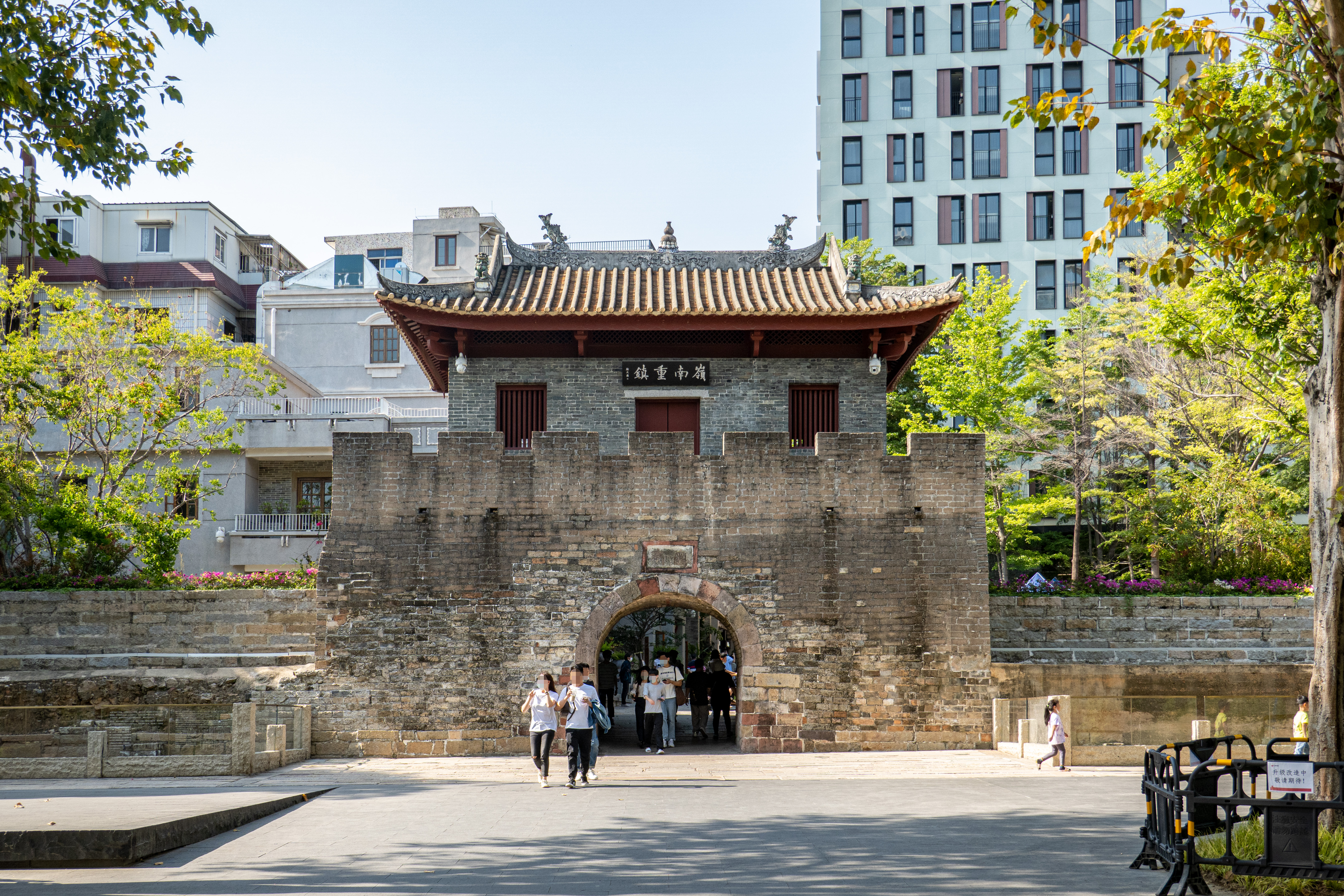
- Simplified Chinese: 南头
- Traditional Chinese: 南頭
- Literal meaning: Southern End
Transcriptions
Standard Mandarin
- Hanyu Pinyin: Nántóu
Yue: Cantonese
- Jyutping: naam^{4} tau^{4}

Nantou (Chinese: 南头) is a historical monument in Shenzhen, China. It was the former administrative centre of Xin'an County.

It was formerly a walled city facing Qianhai Bay. The city was on the sea route in South China and was regarded as the gatekeeper of the Pearl River and Guangzhou. The walled city is also known as Nantoucheng (南头城), "walled city of Nantou". The inhabitants of Nantou extended south along Taishanwan to Chenwuwei (陈屋围), including Guankou (关口) and Shiqiaotou (石桥头).

== History ==
The history of Nantou dates back to 331 CE. It was known as Dongguan (东莞), then the capital of Dongguan Prefecture, in the areas covering present-day Dongguan, Shenzhen, Hong Kong, Huizhou, Zhongshan, Zhuhai and Macau prior to any European settlements. At the same time, it was also the administrative centre of Bao'an, then one of the six counties comprising Dongguan. Since then, it has been repeatedly reported to be prosperous in the salt industry.

In 736 CE, during the Tang dynasty, the city itself was fortified with imperial troops and became known as Tunmen (屯门).

The current walled city was built in 1394, at almost exactly the area of Dongguan, when the government of the Ming dynasty revived the coastal defence after the fall of the Mongol-led Yuan dynasty. It then remained as the administrative centre. Historic reports suggested that the Ming dynasty admiral Zheng He and his crew once sailed pass Nanshan and encountered dangers in the area during the treasure voyages. He went on land and prayed for luck in the Tianhou Temple in Chiwan, which was near to the town itself.

In 1573, 7,608 families, or 33,971 inhabitants, who lived around Dongguan prefecture, moved into the town by the order of the government. Xin'an County was since established.

Nantou gradually lost its prestige as the completion of the Kowloon-Canton Railway made the market town of Shenzhen, east of Nantou more prosperous. The administrative center of the county was moved to Shenzhen in 1953, and remained there until 1979, when the entirety of Bao'an County was renamed Shenzhen and elevated to city status.

== Layout ==
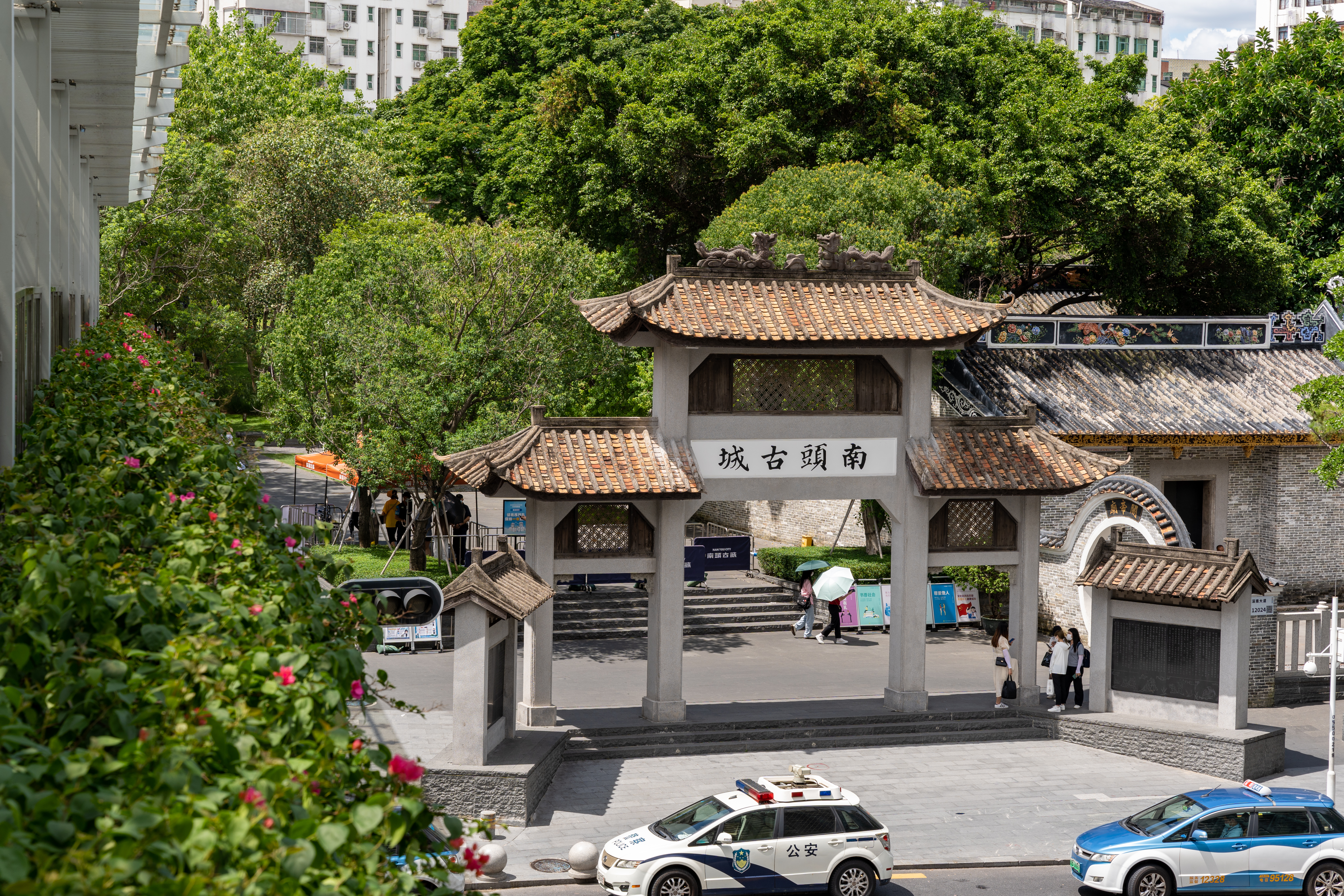
Archway of Nantou Ancient City.

Nantou has an area of roughly 70,000m^{2}. The town is of an irregular quadrilateral shape, with the widest points east to west, and north to south being 680 metres and 500 metres respectively. Eight of the nine streets in the town still exist.

== City walls ==
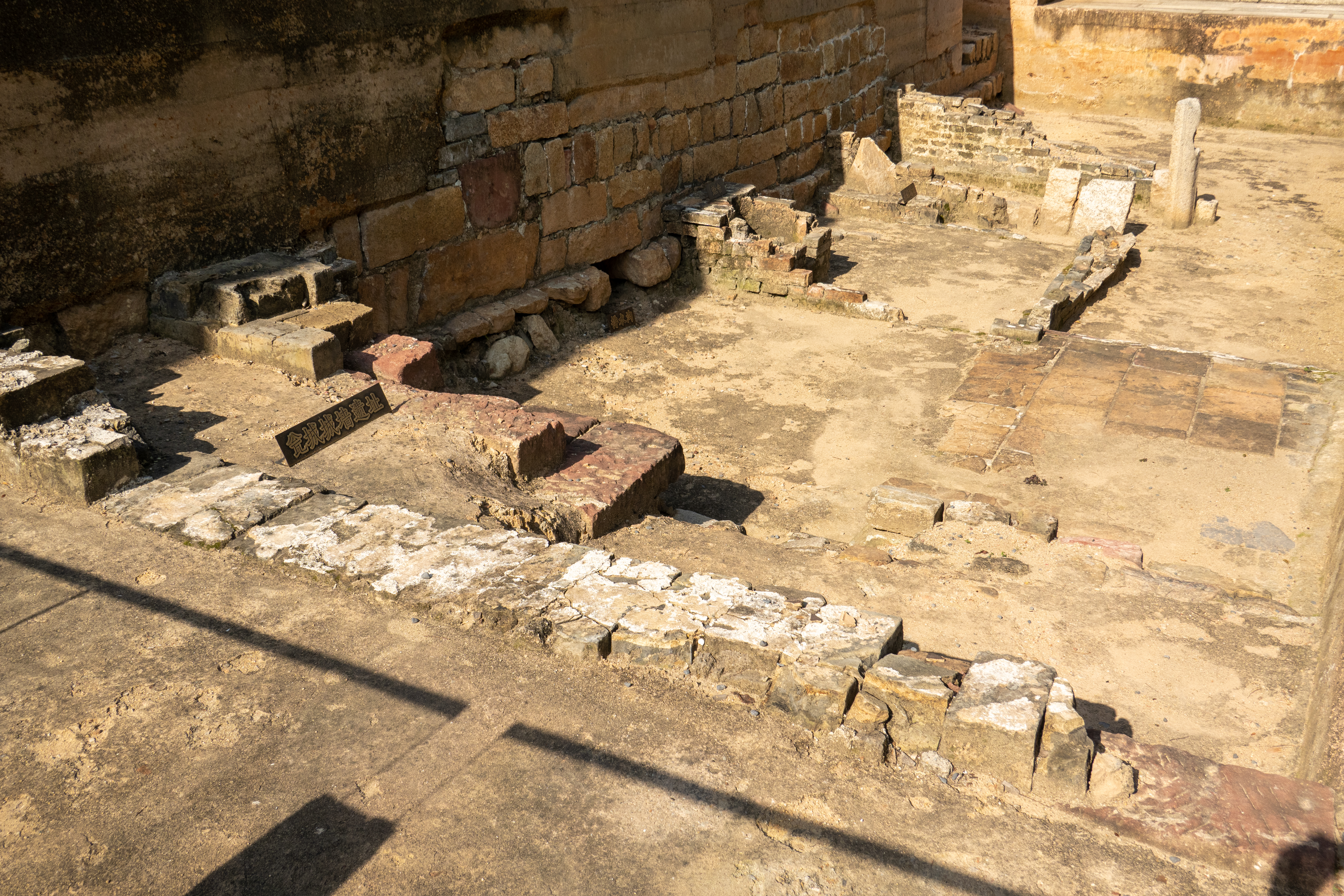
barbican City Wall remains and drainage ditchin in Nantou ancient city

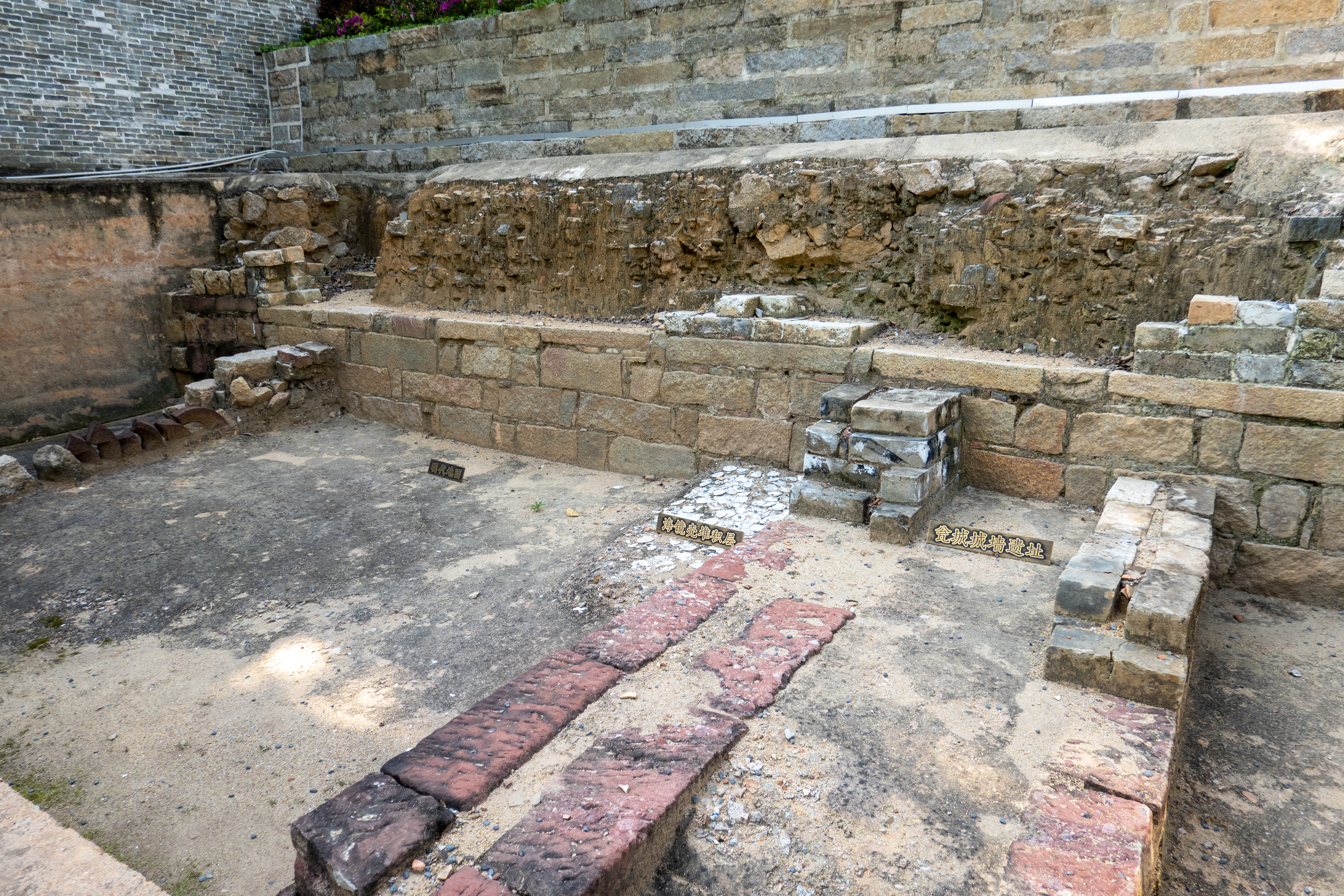
The ruins of the barbican city wall in Nantou ancient city, with the sea mirror shell accumulation layer and the ground of the Ming Dynasty

The foundation of the city walls of Nantou were built using yellow sand. Defensive trenches existed all around the city. Today, almost all of the city walls with the exception of a few sections to the north (currently located within Zhongshan Park), the south gate and the east gate were demolished. The south gate measures 10 metres wide and 4.5 metres tall. A gate tower built atop was destroyed.

== Heritage destruction ==
There were three periods of heritage destruction that took place in Nantou:

The first was during the Kangxi period of the Qing dynasty, during the Great Clearance took place between 1661 and 1669. Xin'an at that time ceased to be a county. Most inhabitants in the town were displaced to other counties to the north. Many buildings in the city and the city walls were destroyed to build a boundary wall 50 li inland.

The second was during the Japanese occupation in the Second Sino-Japanese War when the Japanese built fortifications on the walls.

The third and most recent was after Shenzhen was designated a Special Economic Zone in 1980, when surrounding areas start to be rapidly developed. At this time, large numbers of migrants settled in Nantou. A number of historic buildings, including much of the city walls were again demolished to make way for crammed multi-storied townhouses. Some of these townhouses uses the stone cut off from the city walls. The vast majority of them are unplanned and illegally built (more than 900). The town is gradually turning into what is known as an urban village.

== Restoration efforts and current status ==
A number of historic buildings in the town have undergone preservation efforts. However, the effects were fairly minute. The Shenzhen government renamed the town Xin'an Ancient City (新安故城) and built a museum known simply as Nantou Ancient City Museum in their attempt to revitalize the town as a historic trail. There are still around 40 buildings in the city dating back to the Qing dynasty or the first half of the 20th century.

Nantou District, the official name of Nanshan District between 1983 and 1990, was named after the town. Being then the largest town in the district, Nantou subdistrict also took its name from the town. There are currently more than 20,000 inhabitants living in Nantou.

== See also ==
- Dapeng Fortress
- Fenghuang Village
