= Kat Hing Wai =

Punti walled village of Hong Kong

Coordinates: 22.43971°N 114.064011°E

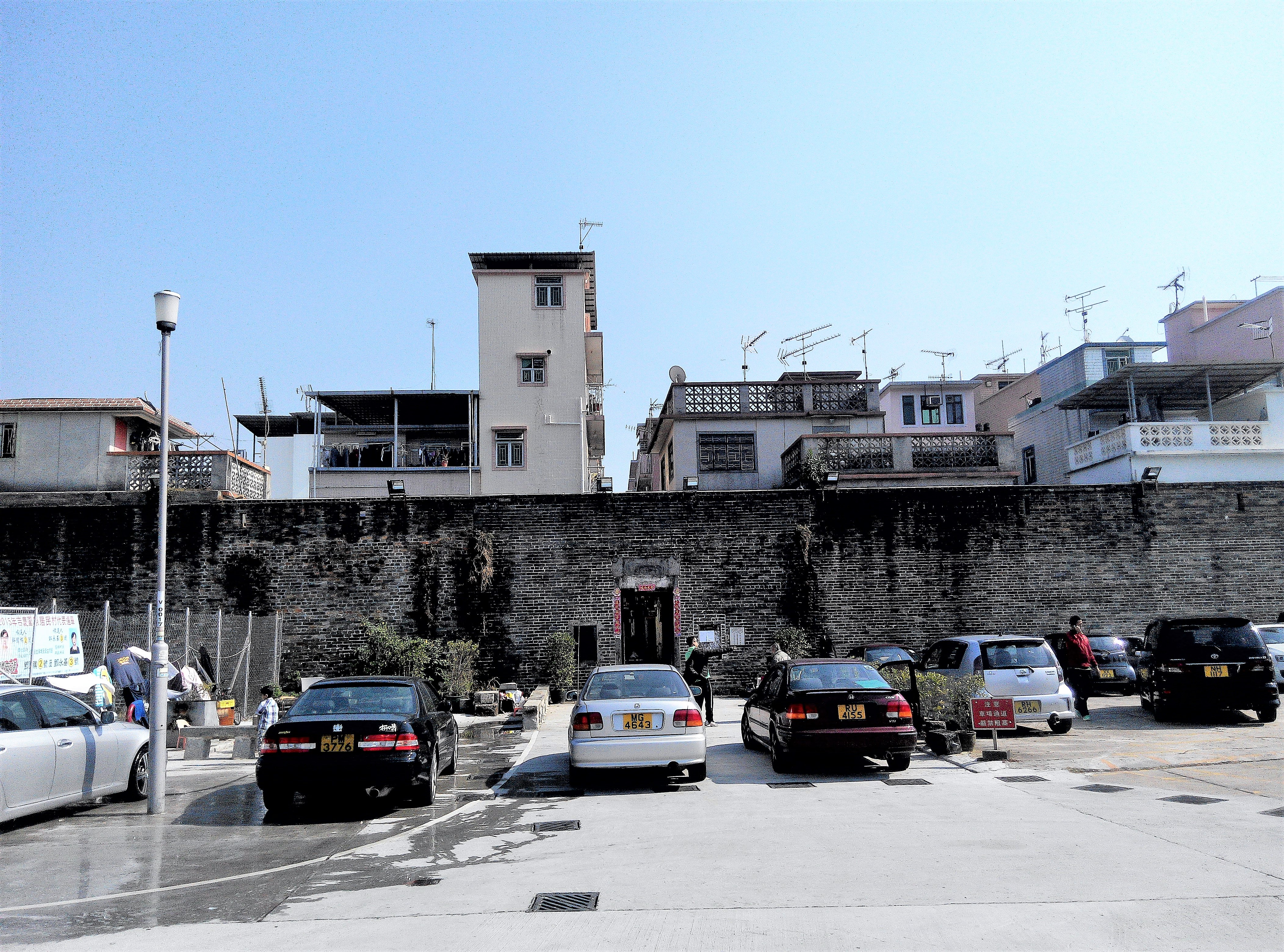
- Western wall and entrance gate of Kat Hing Wai
- Traditional Chinese: 吉慶圍
- Simplified Chinese: 吉庆围
Transcriptions
Standard Mandarin
- Hanyu Pinyin: Jíqìng Wéi
Yue: Cantonese
- Jyutping: gat1 hing3 wai4

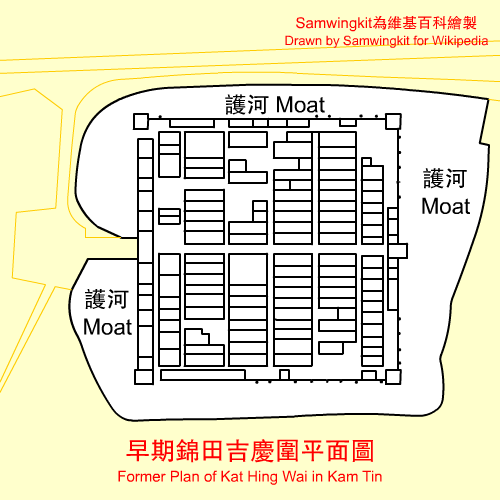
Historic plan of Kat Hing Wai walled village

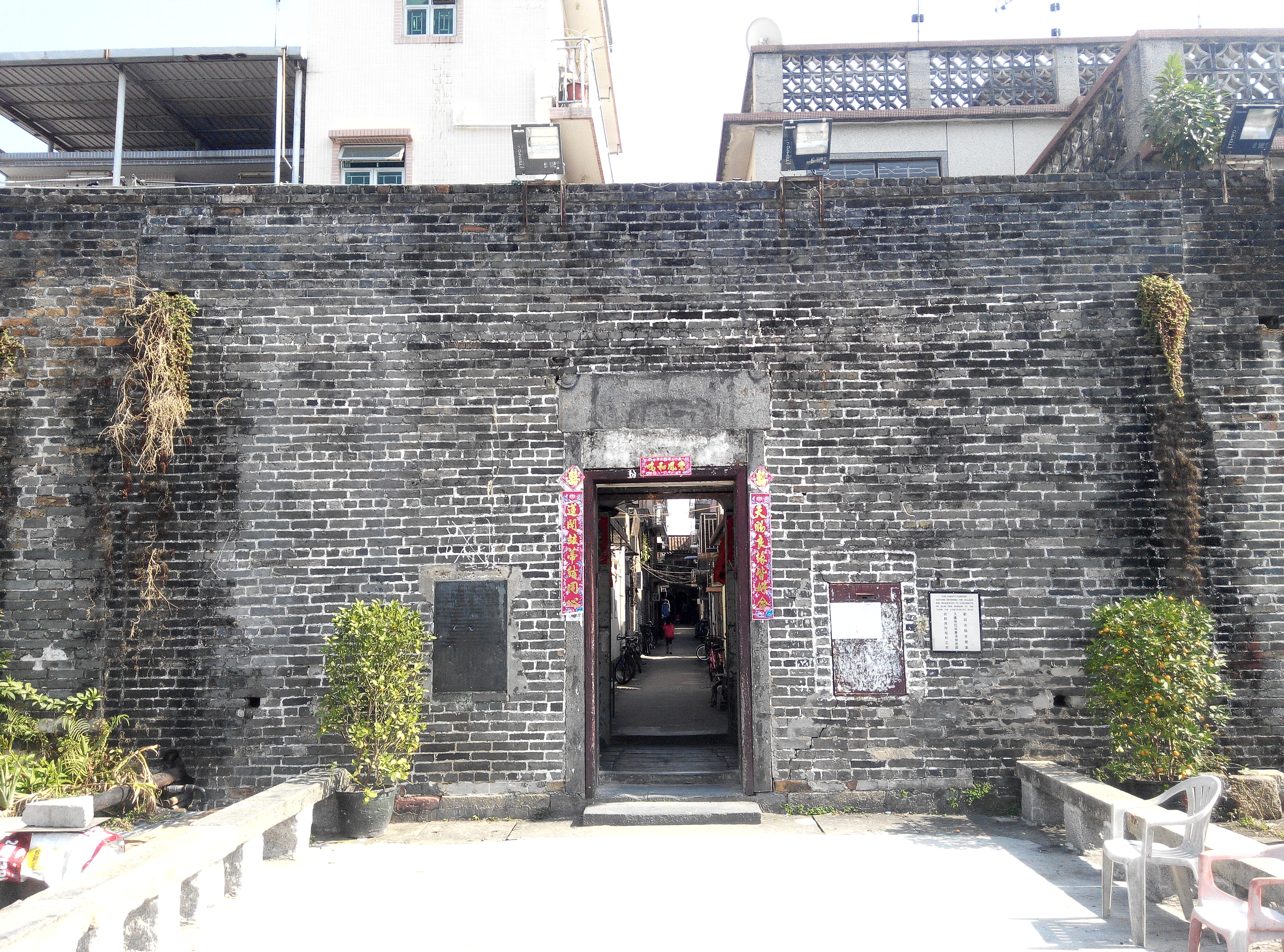
Entrance gate of Kat Hing Wai.

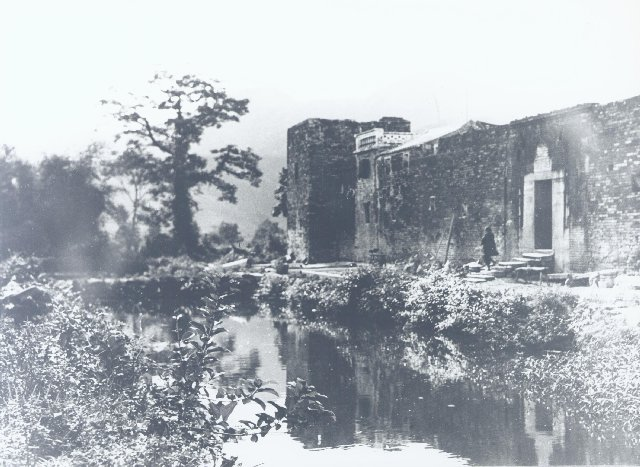
Kat Hing Wai in the 1920s

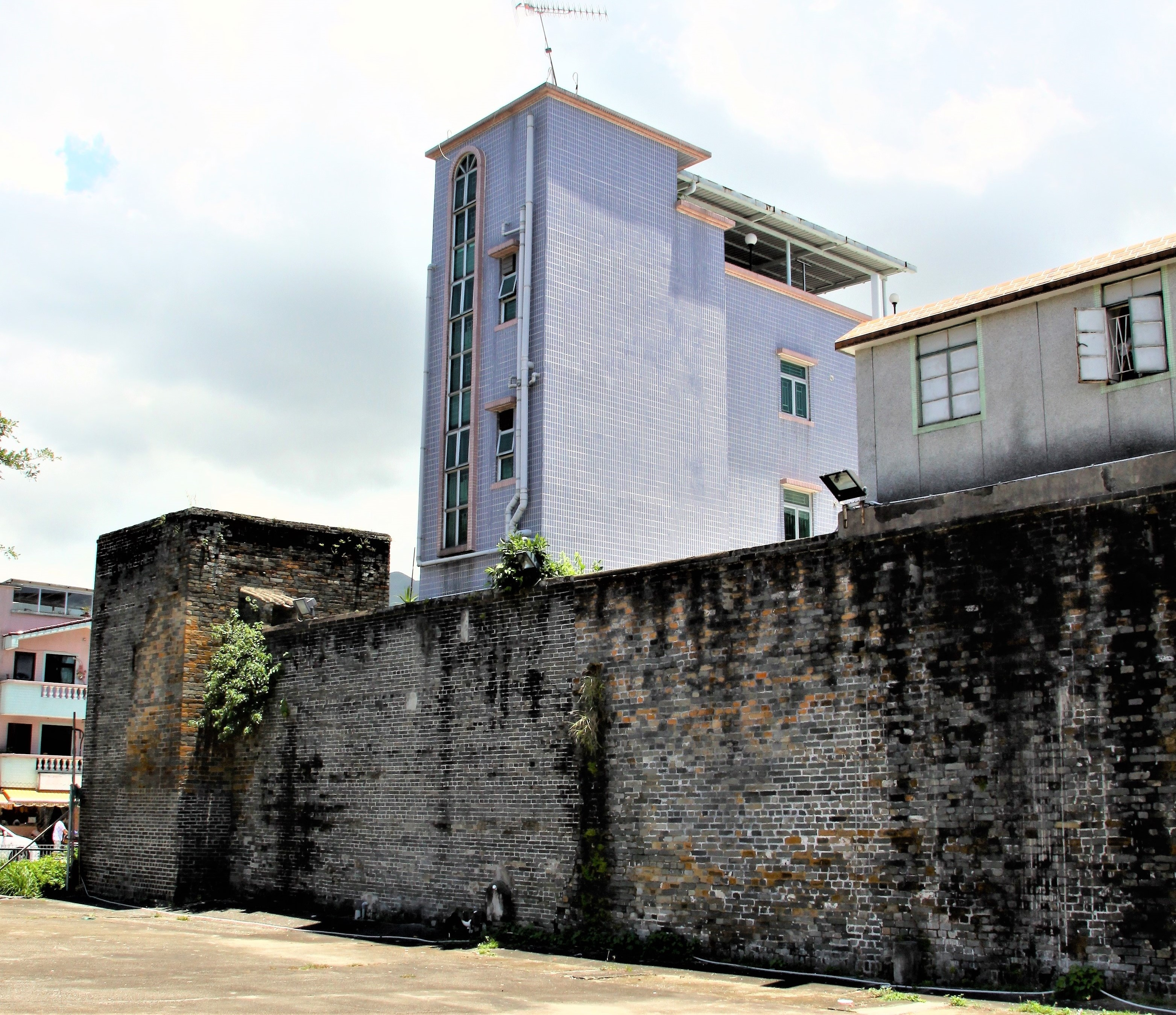
Walls and northwest watchtower in 2013.

Kat Hing Wai (Chinese: 吉慶圍) is a Punti walled village in the Yuen Long District of Hong Kong. The village is popularly known as Kam Tin, from the name of the local area. Kat Hing Wai is home to about 400 descendants of the Tang Clan, one of the "Five Great Clans" of the territory who settled here from China during the Song dynasty. The village walls were added in the 17th century. The Tangs are Punti people descended from Southern China and were the first to settle in Hong Kong. Kat Hing Wai's residents speak the Weitou dialect, a Yue dialect.

Three other walled villages, Wing Lung Wai, Tai Hong Wai, and Kam Hing Wai are located nearby and were built around the same time.

== Administration ==
Kat Hing Wai is a recognized village under the New Territories Small House Policy.

== History ==
Kat Hing Wai was established during the reign of the Ming Chenghua Emperor (r. 1464–1487). The walls enclosing Kat Hing Wai were built by Tang Chue-yin (鄧珠彥) and Tang Chik-kin (鄧直見) in the early years of the Kangxi reign (1661–1722) of the Qing dynasty.

The Six-Day War (1899) was fought between the British Empire and the major punti clans of the New Territories in Hong Kong on 14–19 April 1899. The Tang Clan joined other punti clans in resisting the British takeover of the New Territories and established a defensive position at Kat Hing Wai. After the British defeated the punti clans, the iron gates were symbolically dismantled and shipped to London to be put on display. Following repatriation requests from the Tang Clan in 1924, the gate was eventually returned in 1925 by Sir Edward Stubbs. As a celebration, Kat Hing Wai displays a tablet as an account of this incident by the entrance. Because of this, Kat Hing Wai became a unique place where have a strong icon in both architectural and historical background to be studied.

== Features ==
Kat Hing Wai is a quasi-rectangular (100 by 90 metres (330 by 300 ft)) walled village with seven meters high brick walls, originally used to protect from pirates and another clans' invasion. The village area is about eighty-meter square (i.e. a square with a side length of 80 meters). As a family stronghold, Kat Hing Wai has served the Tangs well through the centuries, protecting the residents against bandits, rival clans, and wild tigers. During the Qing dynasty, a five-metre high blue brick wall and four cannon towers were added to defend against bandits. Today, the village is still completely surrounded by 18-inch-thick walls, outside which are the remains of a moat. However, most houses within the walls have been rebuilt in recent years.

There is only one narrow entrance, with a pair of iron gates that were removed by the British in 1899 and only one was eventually returned in 1924. The current standing gates are a mismatched pair, the left hand side originally belongs to Tai Hong Wai and was given to Kat Hing Wai as a gift when the right gate was returned.

== Conservation ==
Kat Hing Wai is a private property. The Acting Secretary for Home Affairs stated in 2002 that the Antiquities and Monuments Office was negotiating with its owners in order to obtain their agreement to preserve the walled village as a monument. In 2010, the entrance gate, the shrine, the four watchtowers and the enclosing walls of Kat Hing Wai were collectively listed as Grade I historic buildings.

== Education ==
Kat Hing Wai is in Primary One Admission (POA) School Net 74. POA 74 has multiple aided schools and one government school: Yuen Long Government Primary School (元朗官立小學).

== Access ==
Route: West Rail line Kam Sheung Road station or Kowloon Motor Bus bus routes 51, 54, 64K and 251M.

== See also ==
- Walled villages of Hong Kong
