= Tai Hong Wai =

Walled village in Hong Kong

Tai Hong Wai Chinese: 泰康圍
- Village
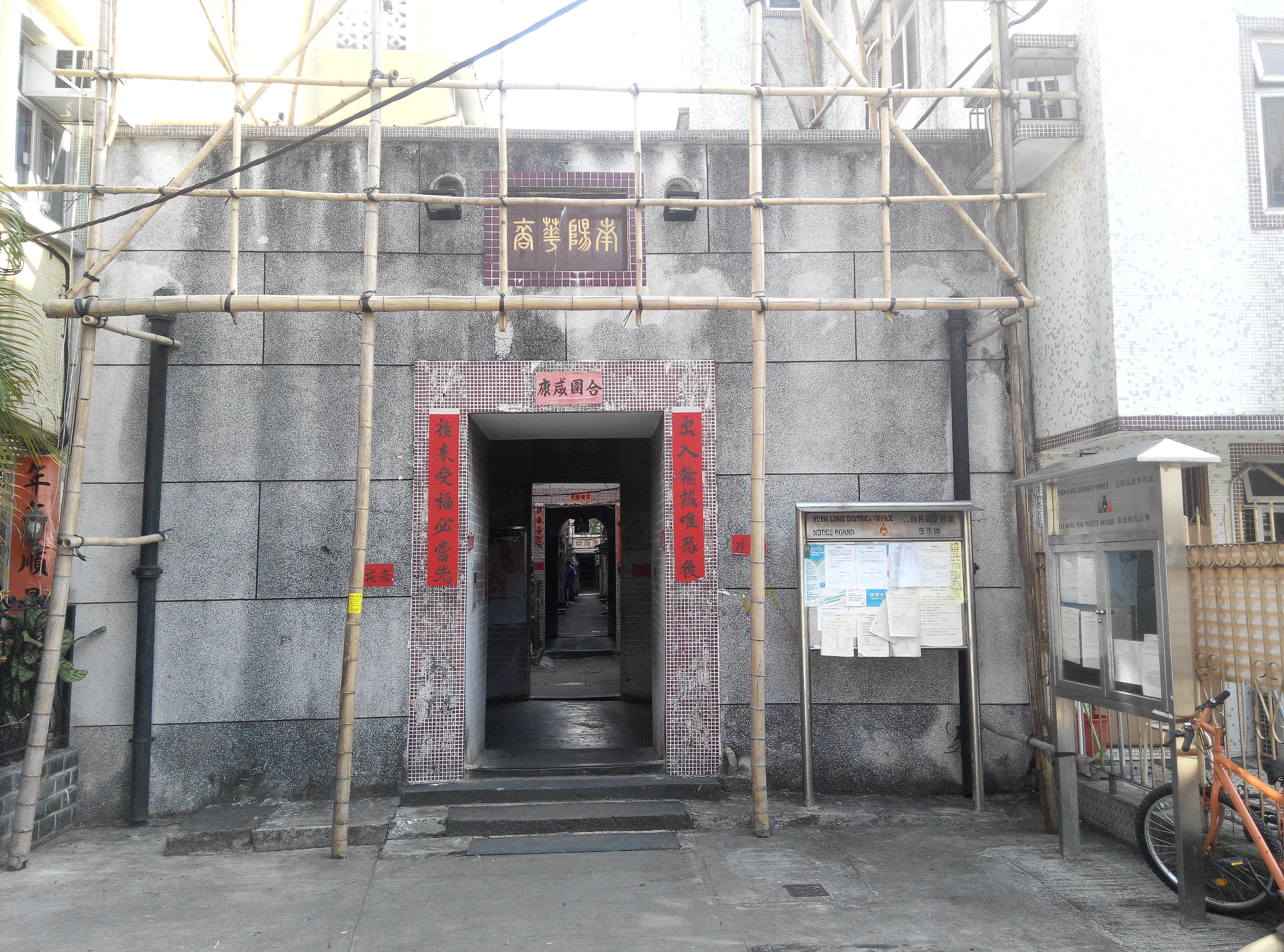
- Entrance gate of Tai Hong Wai in December 2014.

- Location within Hong Kong
- Coordinates: 22.440821°N 114.065154°E
- Country: People's Republic of China
- Special administrative region: Hong Kong
- District: Yuen Long District
- Area: Kam Tin
- Time zone: UTC+8:00 (HKT)

Tai Hong Wai (Chinese: 泰康圍) is a walled village located in the Kam Tin area of Yuen Long District, in Hong Kong. Three other walled villages, Kat Hing Wai, Wing Lung Wai, and Kam Hing Wai are located nearby and were built around the same time.

== Administration ==
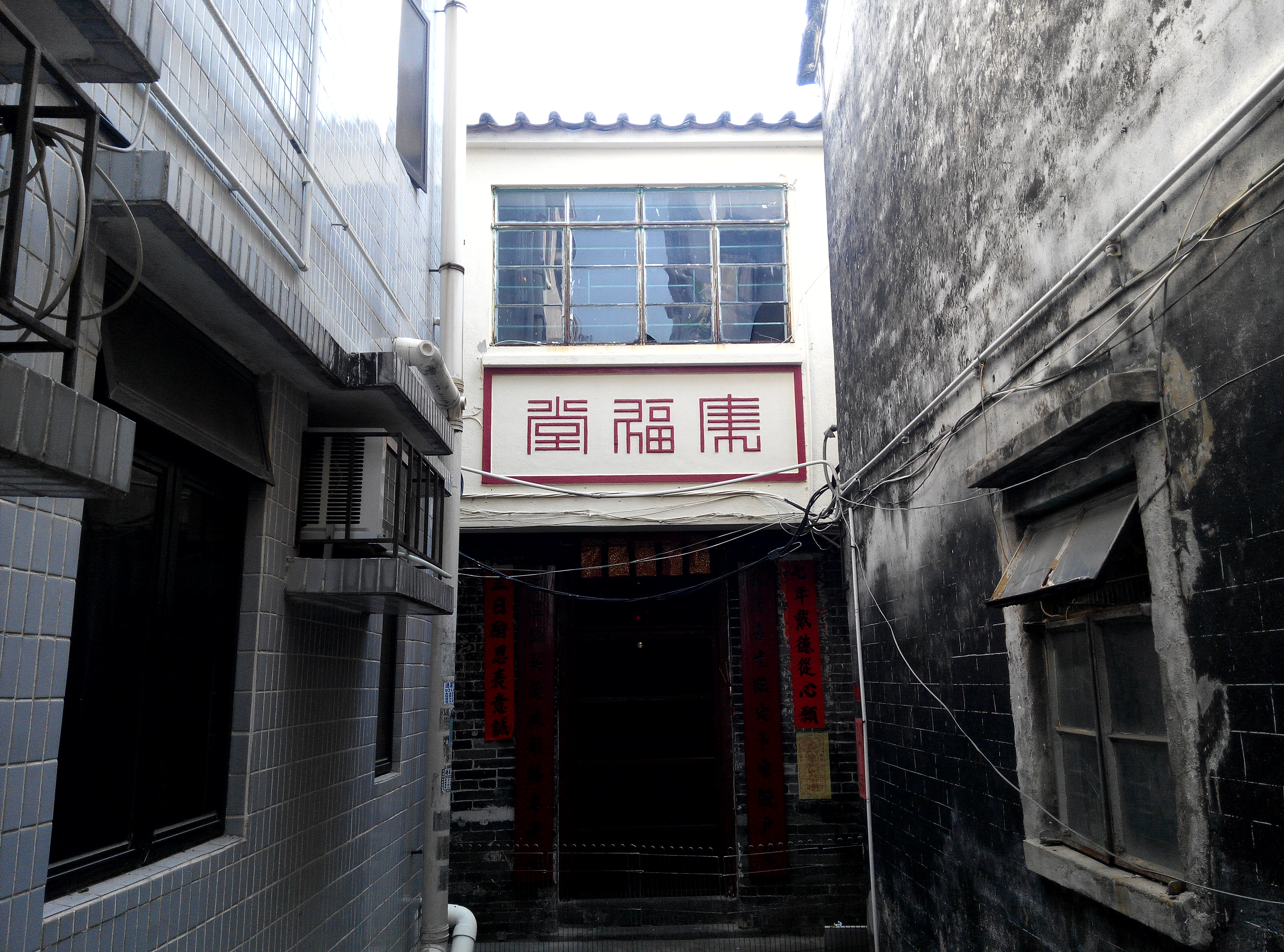
Village shrine of Tai Hong Wai.

Tai Hong Wai is a recognized village under the New Territories Small House Policy.

== Education ==
Tai Hong Wai is in Primary One Admission (POA) School Net 74. POA 74 has multiple aided schools and one government school: Yuen Long Government Primary School (元朗官立小學).

The Tung Tak School (通德學校) is adjacent to Tai Hong Wai. It is an aided school, and is among the aided schools in POA 74.

== Customs ==
In addition to the customs of the Deng people's spring and autumn festivals and lantern festival lighting, Taikangwei also holds a seven-year "reward for the gods and clothes", the most recent of which was held in 2014. Although it is called a Hua Yi, it is actually a mini Jiao Festival, and the ceremony is slightly simpler, and still retains the main part of the general Jiao Festival.

At the beginning of the year, the "Reward God Clothes" first held a cup of "fate first" in the "Qingfu Hall" of the inner shrine hall, and selected 10 fate leaders. At the end of the year, a two-day ritual ceremony was held outside the gate. Before the Jiao Festival begins, a "hero sacrifice" is performed in front of the gate, and then a "water extraction" ceremony is performed at the well outside the wall. The only pole of Jiao will be erected at the intersection in front of the fence. Then from the inner shrine hall to welcome the gods and shrines and other local gods to the Jiao field, in the afternoon first put up the list, then start the "altar" ceremony, and in the evening after the "sacrifice to the small quiet" to end the first day of the ceremony. On the second day, after the "morning class" and "pilgrimage", the "opening ceremony" is carried out. After dinner, the villagers worked together to carry the King of Tuas around Taikang for a circle, and then carried out the ritual of sacrificing the Emperor, and then cremated the King of Tuas after the "sacrifice to the Great You". The next day, there are also "rewarding the gods" and "sending the gods". Taikang Wai did not carry out "walking charms" from house to house, but only distributed "peace charms" to each household for everyone to take home and paste them after the Jiao meeting.

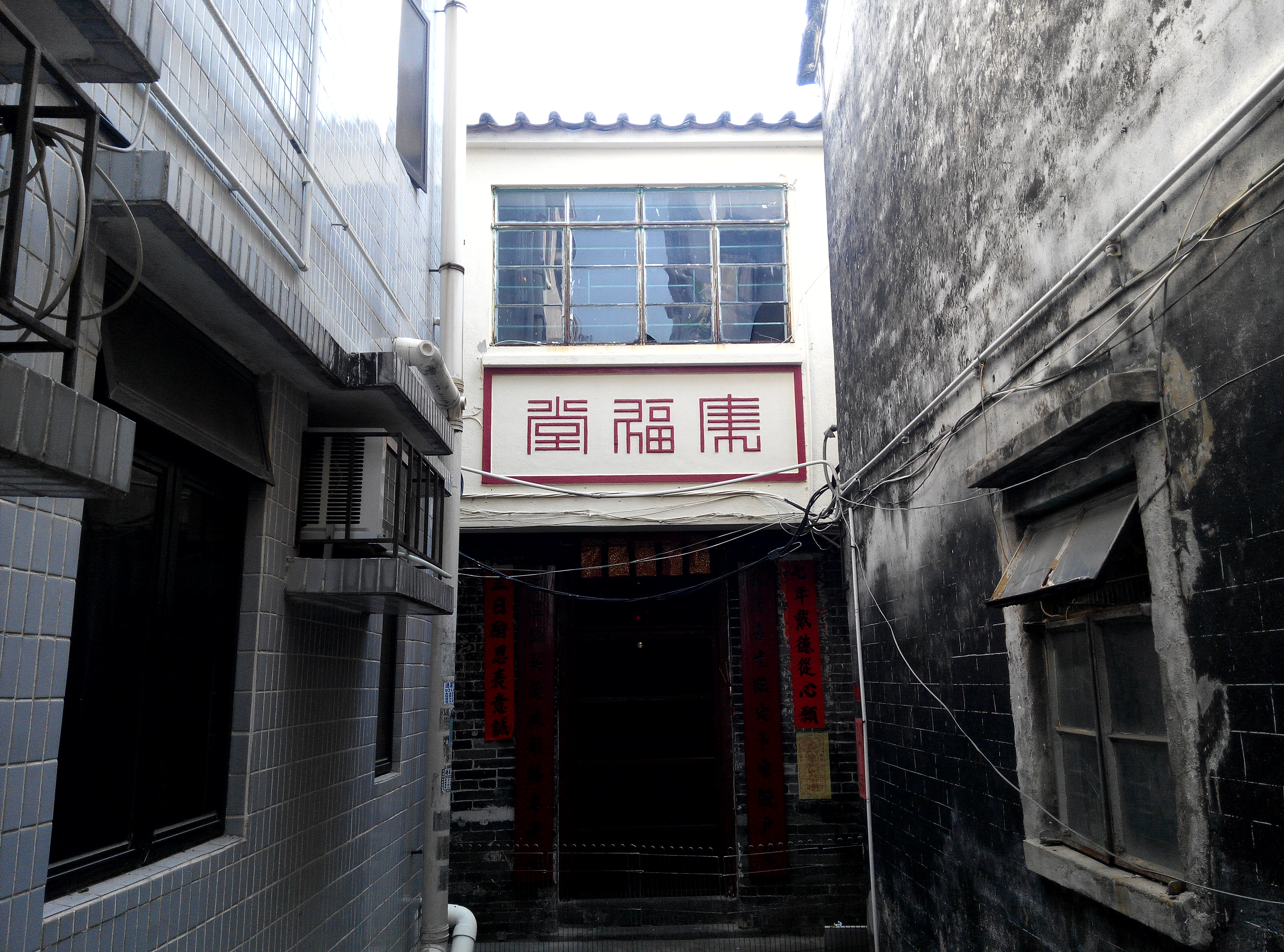

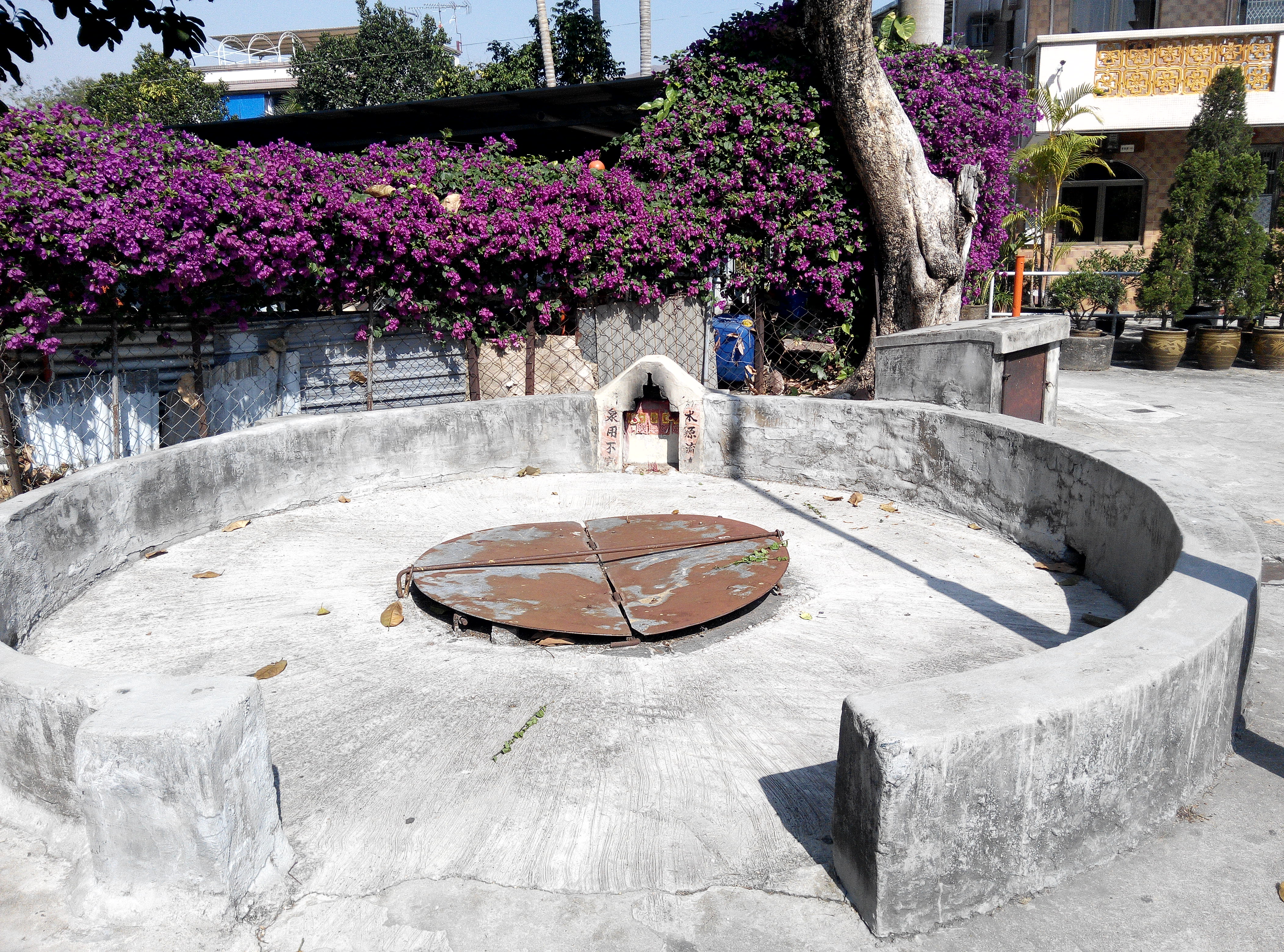
