= Kam Hing Wai =

Kam Hing Wai 錦慶圍
- Walled village
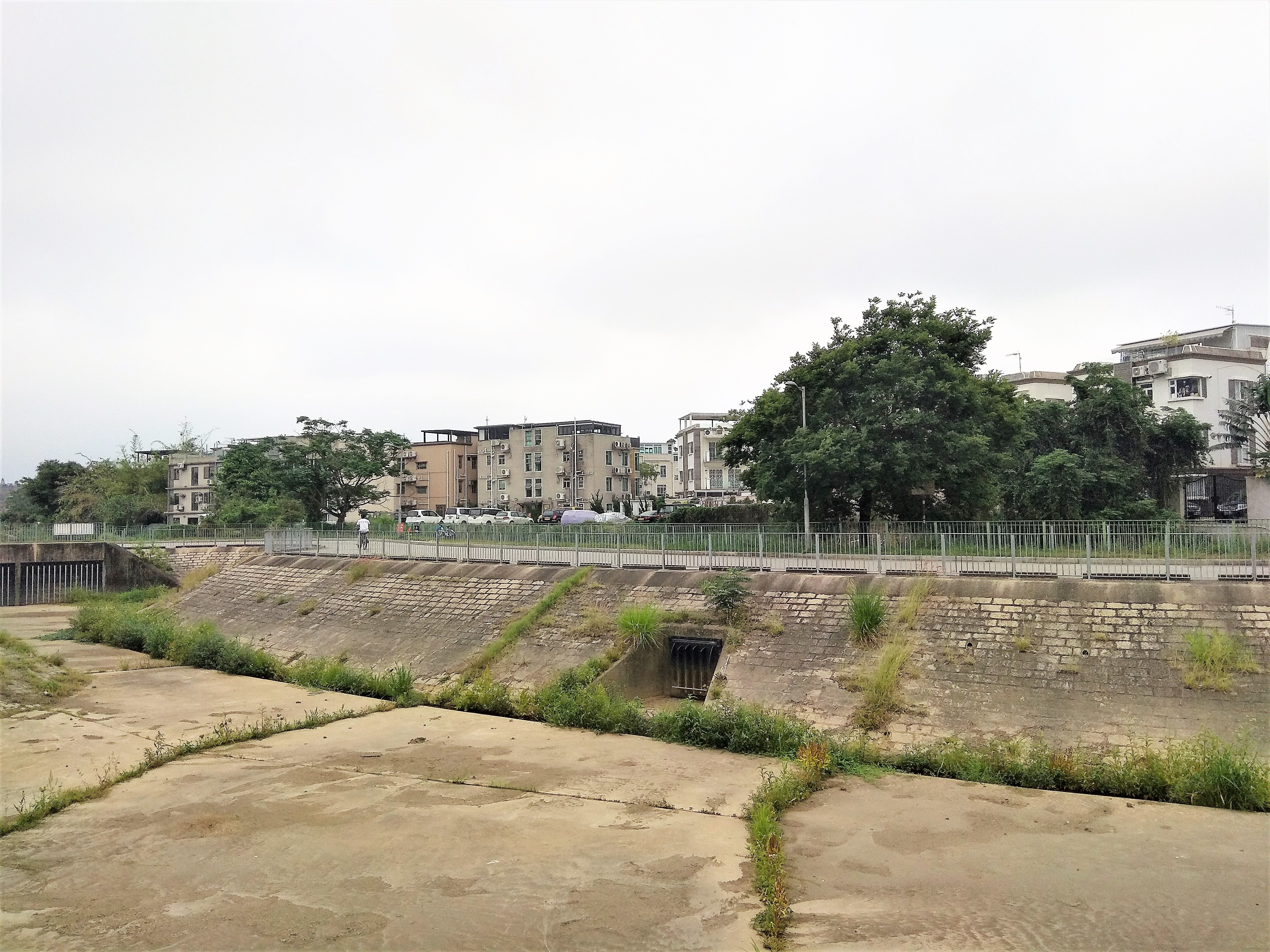

- Location in Hong Kong
- Coordinates: 22.443324°N 114.061466°E
- Country: China
- SAR: Hong Kong
- District: Yuen Long District
- Established: Ming dynasty
- Time zone: UTC+8 (Hong Kong Time)

Kam Hing Wai (Chinese: 錦慶圍) is a walled village located in the Kam Tin area of Yuen Long District, in Hong Kong. Three other walled villages; Kat Hing Wai, Wing Lung Wai, and Tai Hong Wai) are located nearby and were built around the same time.

== Administration ==
Kam Hing Wai is a recognized village under the New Territories Small House Policy.

== History ==
Kam Hing Wai was established by the Tang clan and is probably dated to the Ming dynasty.

== Features ==
Kam Hing Wai was a walled village with a moat surrounding the village; however, the moat was filled and the walls no longer stand. Only 3 to 4 village houses remain in the original traditional architectural style built with grey bricks. Others are replaced by 2 to 3 storey modern buildings. A temple is located at the northeast corner of the village. An Earth God shrine is located at the southeast of the village.

== See also ==
- Walled villages of Hong Kong
