= Wing Lung Wai =

Walled village in Hong Kong

Wing Lung Wai Chinese: 永隆圍; lit. 'Perpetuating Prosperity'
- Village
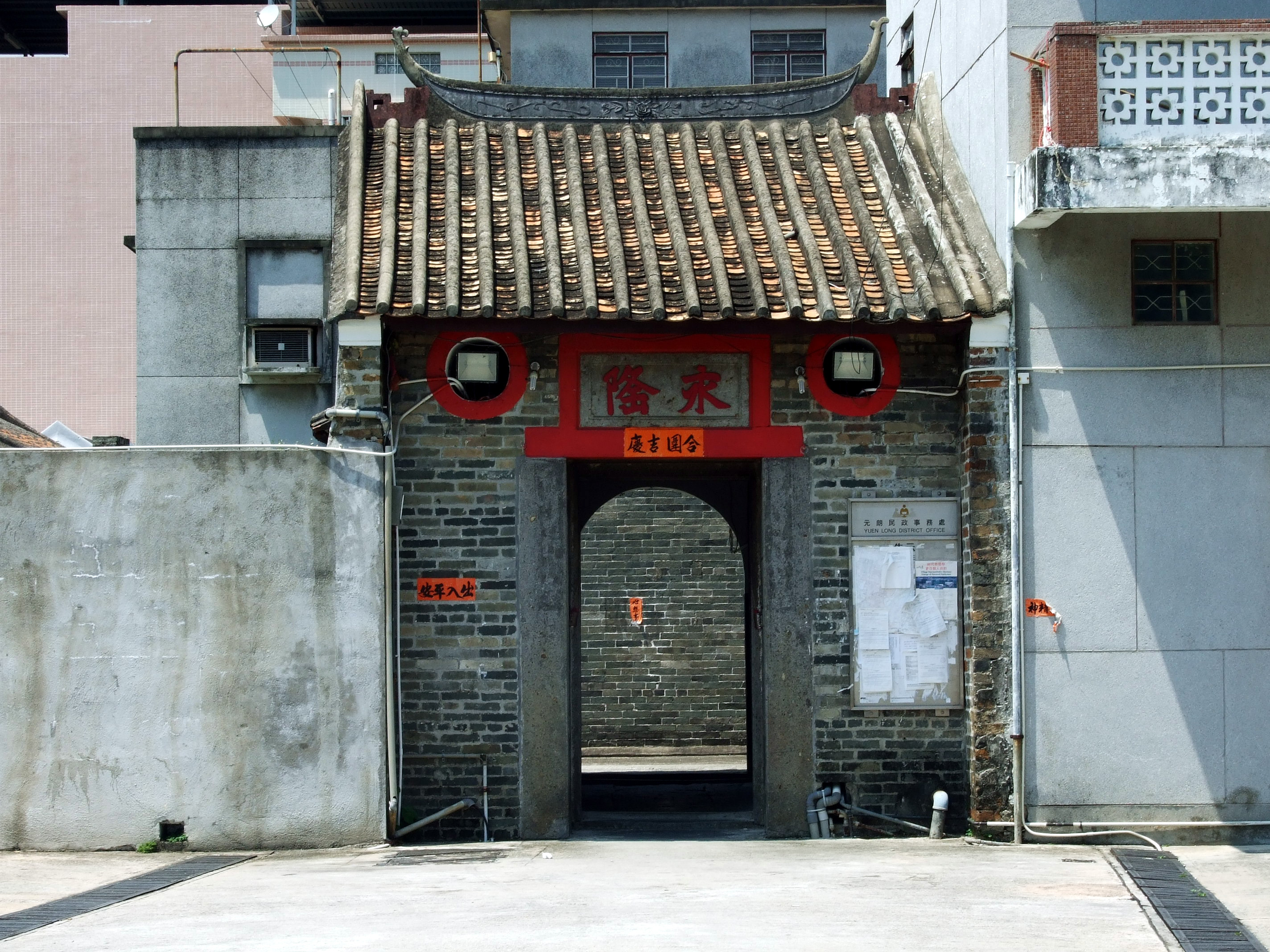
- Entrance gate of Wing Lung Wai.

- Location within Hong Kong
- Coordinates: 22.440042°N 114.067235°E
- Country: People's Republic of China
- Special administrative region: Hong Kong
- District: Yuen Long District
- Area: Kam Tin
- Established: 15th century
- Founder: Tang Siu-kui (鄧紹舉) and his clansmen
- Time zone: UTC+8:00 (HKT)

Wing Lung Wai (Chinese: 永隆圍; lit. 'Perpetuating Prosperity') is a walled village located in the Kam Tin area of Yuen Long District, in Hong Kong. Three other walled villages, Kat Hing Wai, Tai Hong Wai, and Kam Hing Wai are located nearby and were built around the same time.

== Administration ==
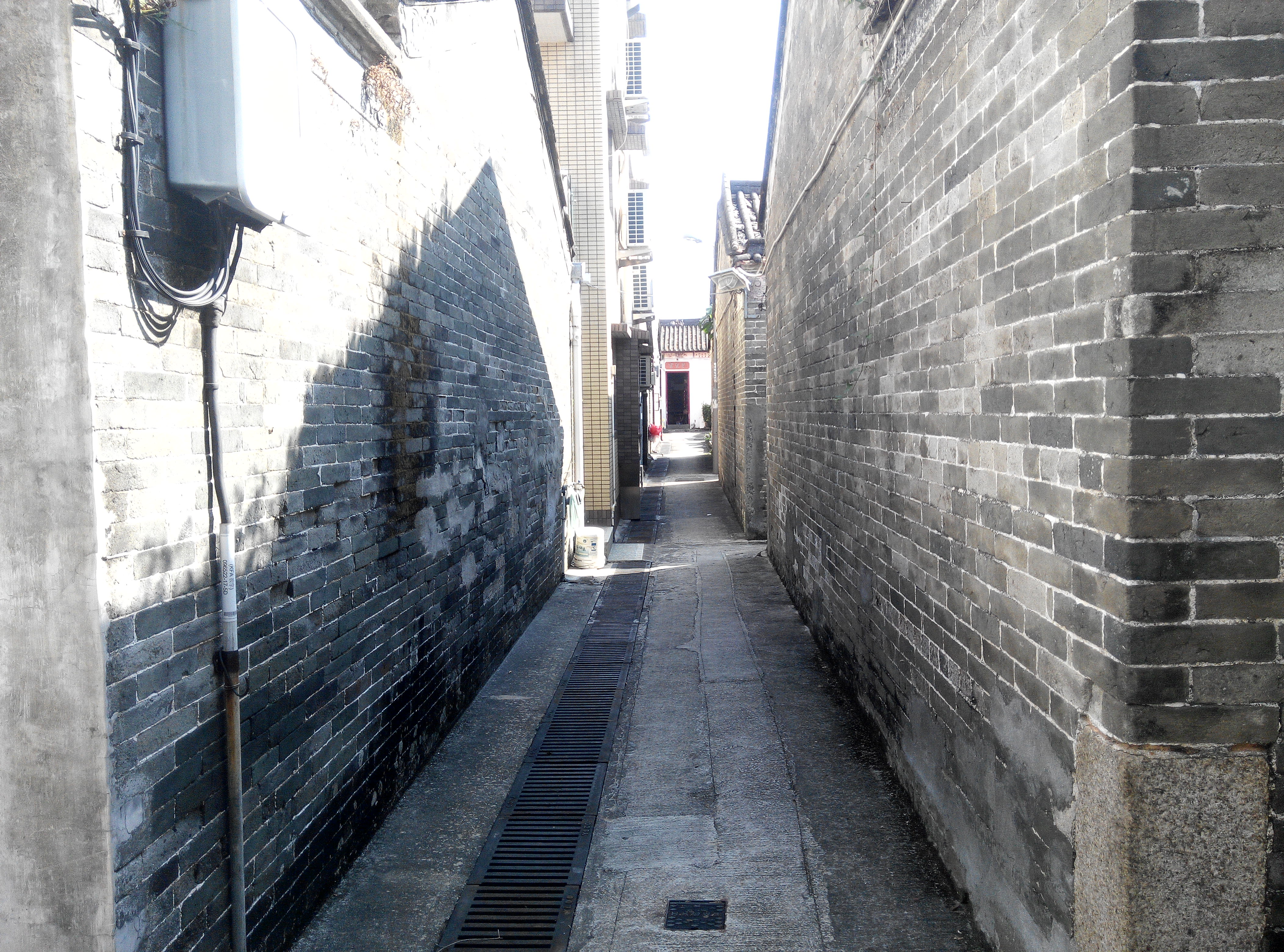
Central axis of Wing Lung Wai, with the Chung Shing Temple at the end.

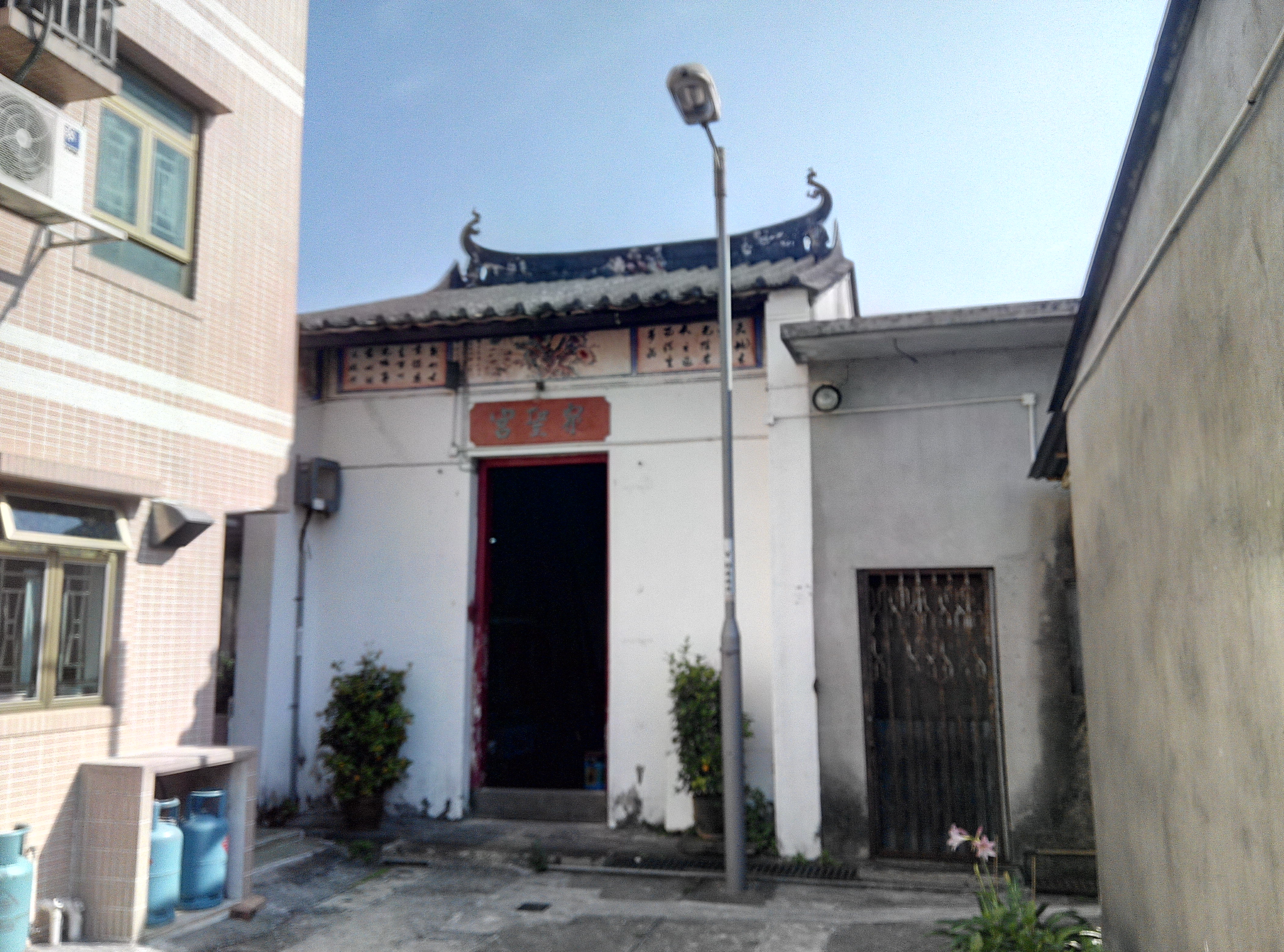
Chung Shing Temple is the village shrine of Wing Lung Wai.

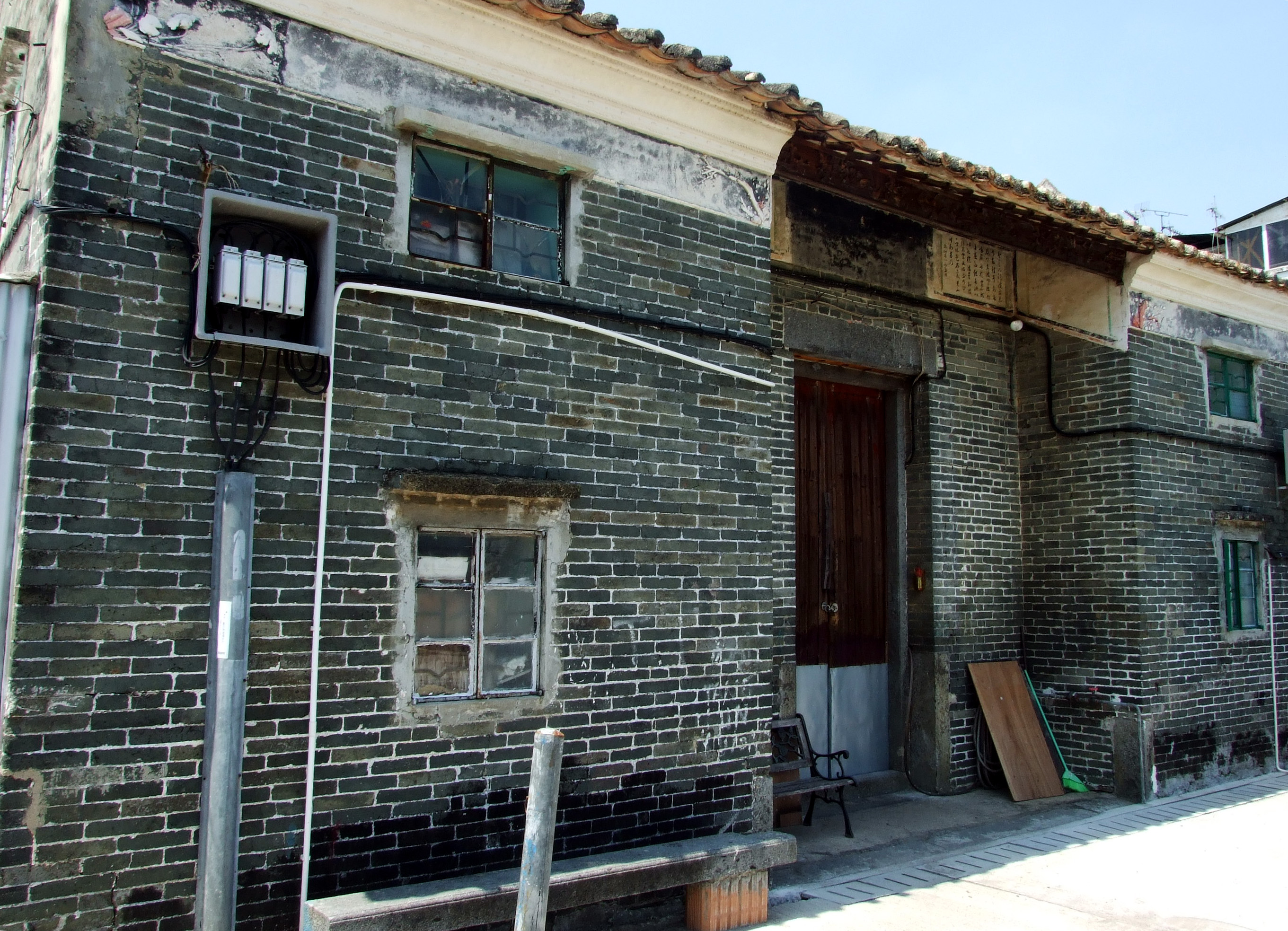
Kang Sam Tong in Wing Lung Wai.

Wing Lung Wai is a recognized village under the New Territories Small House Policy.

== History ==
The village was founded by Tang Siu-kui (鄧紹舉) and his clansmen in the Chenghua reign (1465–1487) of the Ming dynasty. The village was earlier called Sha Lan Mei (沙欄尾) or Wing Lung Wai (永龍圍; 'Everlasting Dragon'). The name was changed into the present name in 1905.

The enclosing wall was built during the Kangxi reign (1661–1722) of the Qing dynasty to safeguard the village from bandits, privates and other enemies. The entrance gate, originally located at the front wall of the village, on its central axis, was later relocated to the south due to feng shui reasons, after establishment of the nearby the walled village Tai Hong Wai. The moat was reclaimed in the 1960s.

== Features ==
In the Chung Shing Temple (眾聖宮; 'Temple of All Saints'), the village shrine, eleven deities are worshiped, including Kwun Yam, Hung Shing and Che Kung.

Kang Sam Tong (耕心堂) was built in Wing Lung Wai in the 1880s. It is an ancestral hall, and it also served as a study hall until 1926.

Although the former watchtowers no longer exist, the northeast watchtower has some base structure left.

== Conservation ==
The entrance gate of Wing Lung Wai is a Grade II historic building. The Chung Shing Temple and the Kang Sam Tong are both Grade III historic buildings.

== Transportation ==
Kowloon Motor Bus (KMB)

- 54 Yuen Long (West) Bus Terminus – Sheung Tsuen (Circular)
- 64K Yuen Long (West) Bus Terminus – Tai Po Market Railway Station
- 77K Yuen Long (Fung Cheung Road) Bus Terminus – Sheung Shui Bus Terminus
- 251B Pat Heung Road Bus Terminus – Sheung Tsuen (Circular)

Green Minibus (GMB)

- 602 Yuen Long (Fung Cheung Road) – Tai Kong Po

MTR

- Kam Sheung Road
