= Tung Lin Kok Yuen =

Coordinates: 22.266941°N 114.185613°E

- 東蓮覺苑
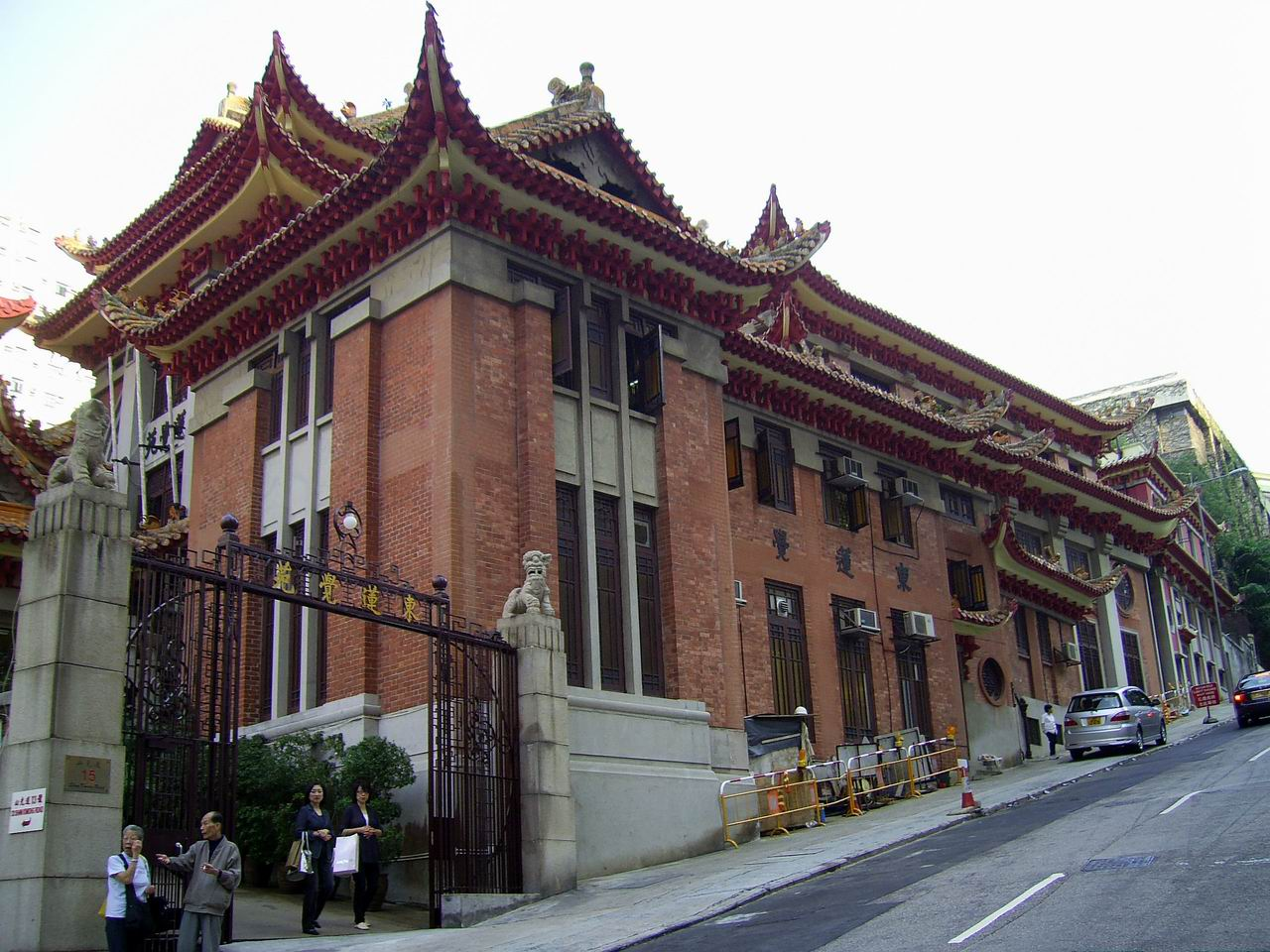
- Exterior of Tung Lin Kok Yuen along Shan Kwong Road.
- Interactive map of Tung Lin Kok Yuen

Monastery information
- Order: Mahayana Buddhism
- Established: 1935

People
- Founder: Lady Clara Ho-Tung,

Architecture
- Heritage designation

Declared Monument of Hong Kong
- Designated: 17 October 2017
- Reference no.: 115

Site
- Location: Happy Valley, Hong Kong
- Website: https://www.tlky.org/

Tung Lin Kok Yuen
- Traditional Chinese: 東蓮覺苑
Transcriptions
Yue: Cantonese
- Yale Romanization: Dūng lìhn gok yún
- Jyutping: Dung1 lin5 gok3 jyun2

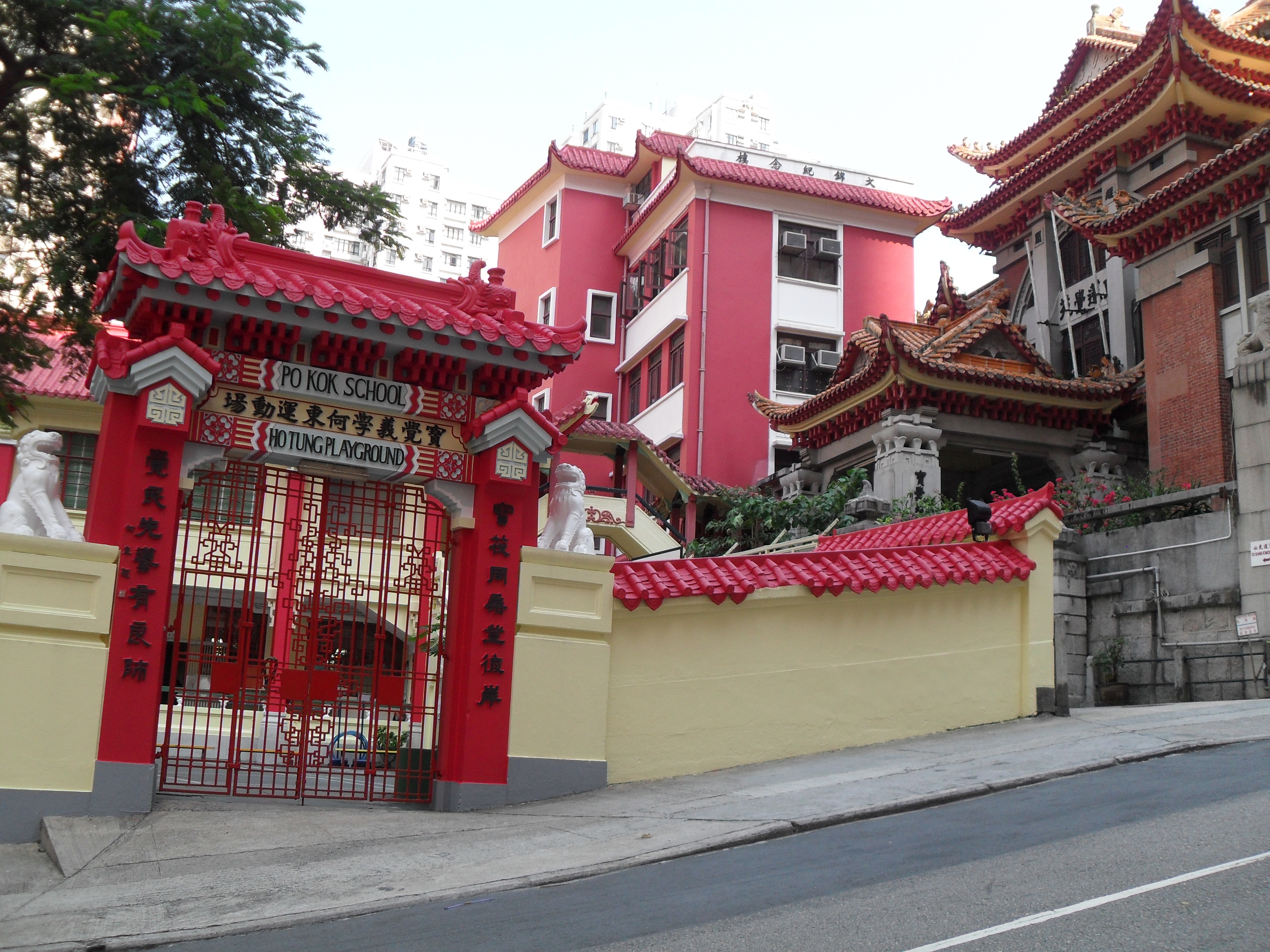
Exterior of Tung Lin Kok Yuen along Shan Kwong Road. Po Kok Primary School is on the left.

Tung Lin Kok Yuen is a Buddhist nunnery and educational institution located at No.15 Shan Kwong Road in Happy Valley, Hong Kong. Founded in 1935 by Lady Clara Ho-Tung, it is home to approximately 30 nuns and 50 lay devotees.

It is the only seminary for Buddhist nuns in Hong Kong and provides an 8-year curricular programme in Mahayana Buddhism. It contains both a primary day and primary night school, the Po Kok Vocational Middle School, and a separate branch of primary schools in the New Territories. In all institutions a study of Buddhist Sutras is given, but other subjects, depending on the location, include Mathematics, English, Chinese and History. All said institutions are female-only, and the total enrolment is 1,256.

A large draw to Tung Lin is its two halls housing memorial tablets for the deceased. Each Remembrance Day, Tung Lin hosts a public service for the souls of the dead there. Similarly, there have been famous courses offered several times a year at the seminary, taught by authorities from the Sangha. These courses last several weeks each session. Both events are sponsored by the Hong Kong Buddhist Association.

== History ==
In 1931, Lady Clara Cheung Lin Kok (wife of Sir Robert Ho Tung) received a sum of $100,000 from her husband as a gift for their 50th wedding anniversary. During that period, China faced civil war and social disputes, causing many tragedies and chaos in the society. Lady Clara Lin Kok, who was a faithful believer in Buddhism, decided to use the anniversary gift to establish a base for the propagation of Buddha's teaching. Her vision and goals are to promote social harmony and to build a school so as to allow children of poverty to receive education with Buddhism teachings.

The location was selected to be in vibrant Happy Valley. The twelve thousand square feet plot of land where now the temple stands, was purchased from the Hong Kong Government by Lady Clara. She had also invited Ven. Aiting (靄亭法師), who had retired as the abbot of the Bamboo Grove Monastery, also called Zhulin Temple (鎮江竹林寺), to supervise the construction project. Ven. Aiting at the same time was invited to give dharma talks to the community. The temple is named after Lady Clara and Sir Robert Ho Tung, in memory for her husband's support of her charity work and also his virtuous acts.

Tung Lin Kok Yuen's construction was finally completed in 1935, comprising a Buddhist temple and Po Kok Free School, first free Buddhist school for girls in Hong Kong. As the number of students outgrew the spaces available in the temple building, a new school building was built next to Tung Lin Kok Yuen in 1951 which held the Po Kok Vocational Middle School.

== Lady Clara Lin Kok ==
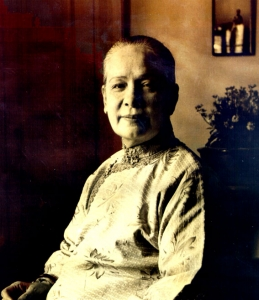
Lady Clara Lin Kok

Lady Clara Lin-Kok (1875–1938) was the second of two wives of Sir Robert. She married him in 1895. She was the mother to ten children, 7 daughters and 3 sons. Lady Clara Lin-Kok, supported by Sir Robert, invested a considerable amount of time and energy in her life to the establishment of diverse charitable activities aimed at assisting and alleviating the sufferings of the infirmed, disadvantaged and underprivileged. Her charitable acts were largely inspired by her belief in, and devotion to, the Buddhist faith.

=== Realization of Buddhism ===
The suffering that Lady Clara experienced in her life has made her devotion to Buddhism stronger as she held on to her faith while going through the tough times. The early death of her eldest son, serious illness contracted by her immediate family, such as Sir Robert Ho Tung contracting a serious case of pneumonia, her parents' death and her throat condition had energised her faith greatly. She sought relief of suffering by continually reciting the name of Buddha and found herself in a state of peace, comprehending the realities of human suffering.

=== Dedication to Buddhism ===
Lady Clara made the Bodhisattva vow – that she would commit her life to help alleviate the sufferings of all sentient beings at Putuo Shan, when she was there with her eldest daughter, who had then just recovered from post natal depression. Her husband supported her fully in her decision. After returning to Hong Kong, Lady Clara contacted followers to promote Dharma activities in the colony. Some of these activities include a seven-day retreat in 1922, where she invited many reputable and prominent monks to Hong Kong to spread teachings of Dharma and a series of talk on Mahayana Buddhism, lasting three months in 1925, addressing the misconceptions and misrepresentation of the Buddhist teachings in the colony. All the events attracted many believers and the response was positive. Lady Clara travelled widely to visit esteemed monasteries to pursue her journey to truth. She visited in total twenty one famous mountains and other famous monasteries such as Mount Wutai and Mount Lao.

=== Contribution to society ===
Lady Clara herself did not have much education and she did not want the future generation to follow her footsteps. She believed that education for women is essential for advancement of social stability. She founded the Po Kok First Free school in Hong Kong in 1930 and soon after Po Kok Second Free school was started in Macau too. The primary purpose of these schools was to provide practical education to women in the society so as to promote greater independence. Lady Clara Lin-Kok wholly dedicated the latter part of her life to promoting Buddhist education at Tung Lin Kok Yuen. She worked diligently until the day of her death in 1938. To continue her mission in posterity she nominated successors to posts in Tung Lin Kok Yuen's board of directors in her will.

== Construction and design ==
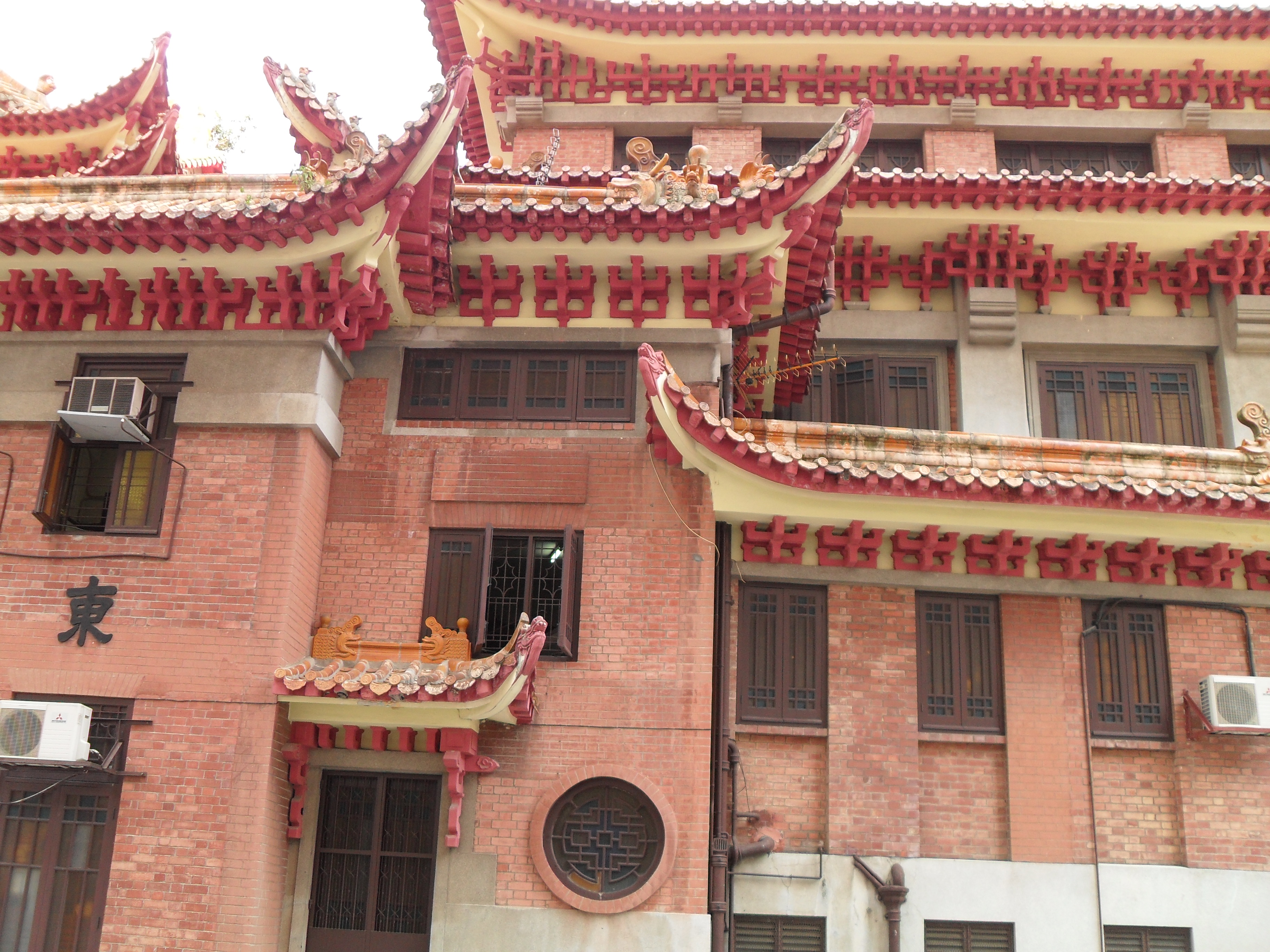
Blended Sino-British architecture style.

In 1935 the same year that Tung Lin Kok Yuen was completed, the Po Kok School and the Society for the Study of Buddhism were merged under the one roof and operated out of the temple premises. The building itself while not very old, is of special interest because many of the religious images, furniture and fittings survived the Japanese occupation when very little else in the colony did.

=== Interior design and style ===
Tung Lin Kok Yuen contains a dharma hall, lecture theatre, library, sutra hall, dining hall, ancestral hall and dormitories. One main feature of Tung Lin Kok Yuen is the amazing and valuable collection of calligraphy and Chinese-style couplets written by renowned personages.

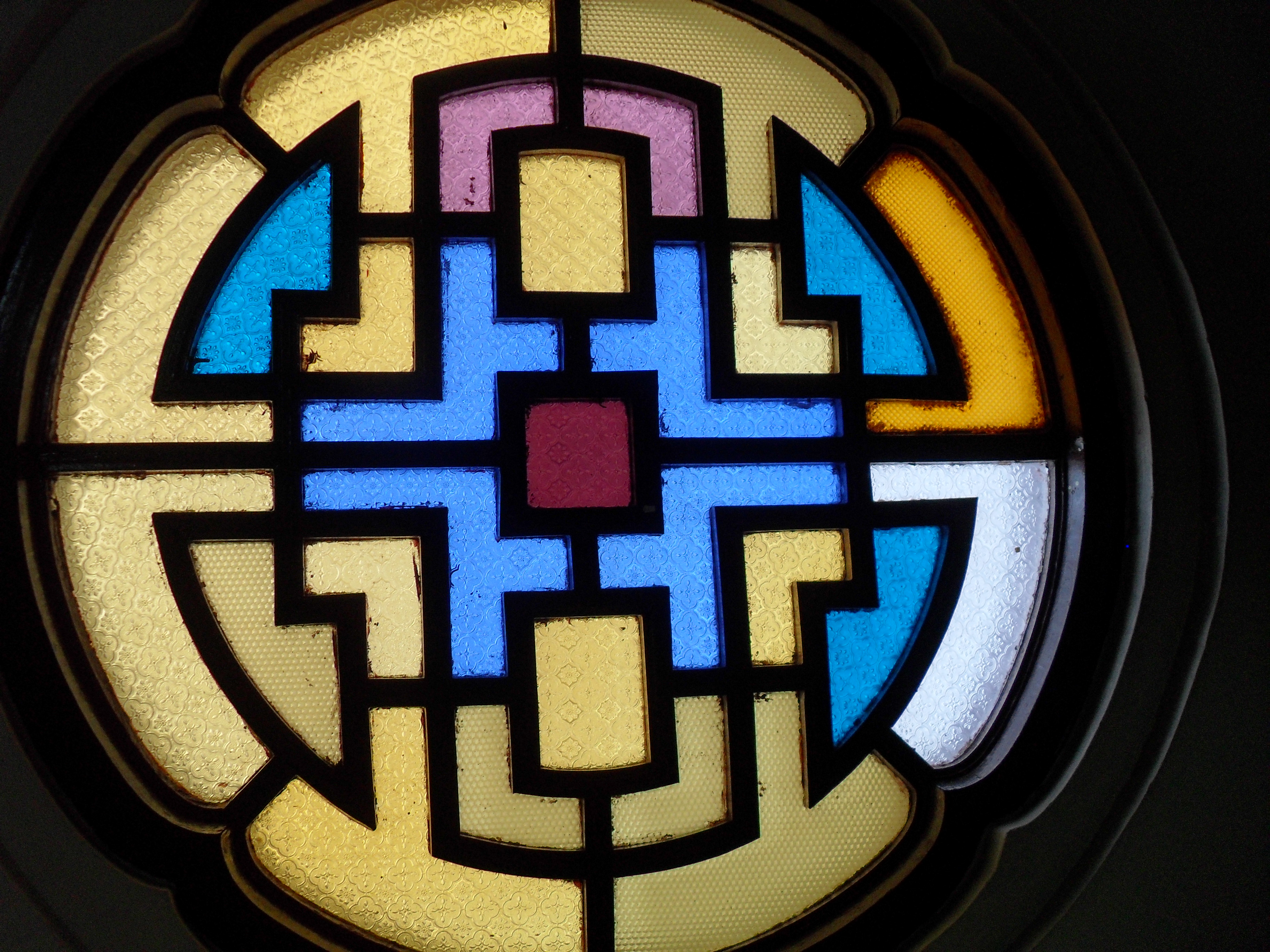
Italian stained glass window in Tung Lin Kok Yuen.

The fittings inside the building were mostly carried out by Shanghainese craftsmen who also worked on Sir Robert Hotung's house on the Peak. Within the Yuen there are two halls which are devoted to the maintenance of memorial tablets for the dead. One of these is part of the original building and the other was made later as an extension in 1959.

The construction style of Tung Lin Kok Yuen is a fusion between the traditional oriental elegance and classical western construction elements. The imported Italian stained windows resemble those typically used in churches. Conventional architectural features of imperial palaces such as curved ceramic tiled roofs are prominent and the mixture of different styles give Tung Lin Kok Yuen its own unique characteristics. The appearance of the entire temple is shaped like a boat, which matches with the symbolism that Buddha will guide the people in the sea of suffering to the way of light.

=== Classification as Historical Building ===
Historical buildings, site and ancient structures in Hong Kong may be legally protected under the Antiquities and Monuments Ordinance. The procedure for declaring a building or site to be protected is fully contained in the legislation. In brief, the Antiquities Authority may, after consulting the Antiquities Advisory Board, with the approval of the Chief Executive and publication of notice in the government gazette to declare protection of a place. In practice, the Chief Executive will also consult the Executive Council in controversial case.

Tung Lin Kok Yuen has been classified as a Grade I Historical building in Hong Kong. According to the guidelines issued by Antiquities Advisory Board and the Antiquities and Monuments Office, Grade I is defined as "Buildings of outstanding merit, which every effort should be made to preserve if possible."

When a building is selected to be classified, extensive repairs and restoration work would be conducted if needed by the government in order to preserve the historical heritage. Tung Lin Kok Yuen, although only 70 odd years old, suffers from groundwater infiltration, which degenerates the teak floor layer. The conservation work performed in the temple include recovering of concrete foundation and teak flooring; insertion of plastic between ground and concrete foundation; and adding of underground drainage system. All these work aim to facilitate the discharge of underground water and prevent infiltration.

Tung Lin Kok Yuen was declared a monument on October 13, 2017.

== Present uses ==
Tung Lin Kok Yuen is currently used to advance the cause of Buddhism and managing the respective schools under the Po Kok team. The temple is also concerned with the practical needs of the community and social projects which will benefit it. Examples of these projects include the publication of the Lin Kok Quarterly Journal and the "Lin Kok Collection" which uses both Chinese and non-Chinese scholars to discuss and reflect on the true meaning of life. The Yuen also contributes financial aid toward the Hong Kong Society for the Aged and the construction of an aged care facility and also the Mental Health Association of Hong Kong and its work on mental health rehabilitation. Regular classes in advanced studies of Buddhism, classes in Buddhist hymns, classes in meditation and so forth are also offered at the Yuen.

== Po Kok Schools ==
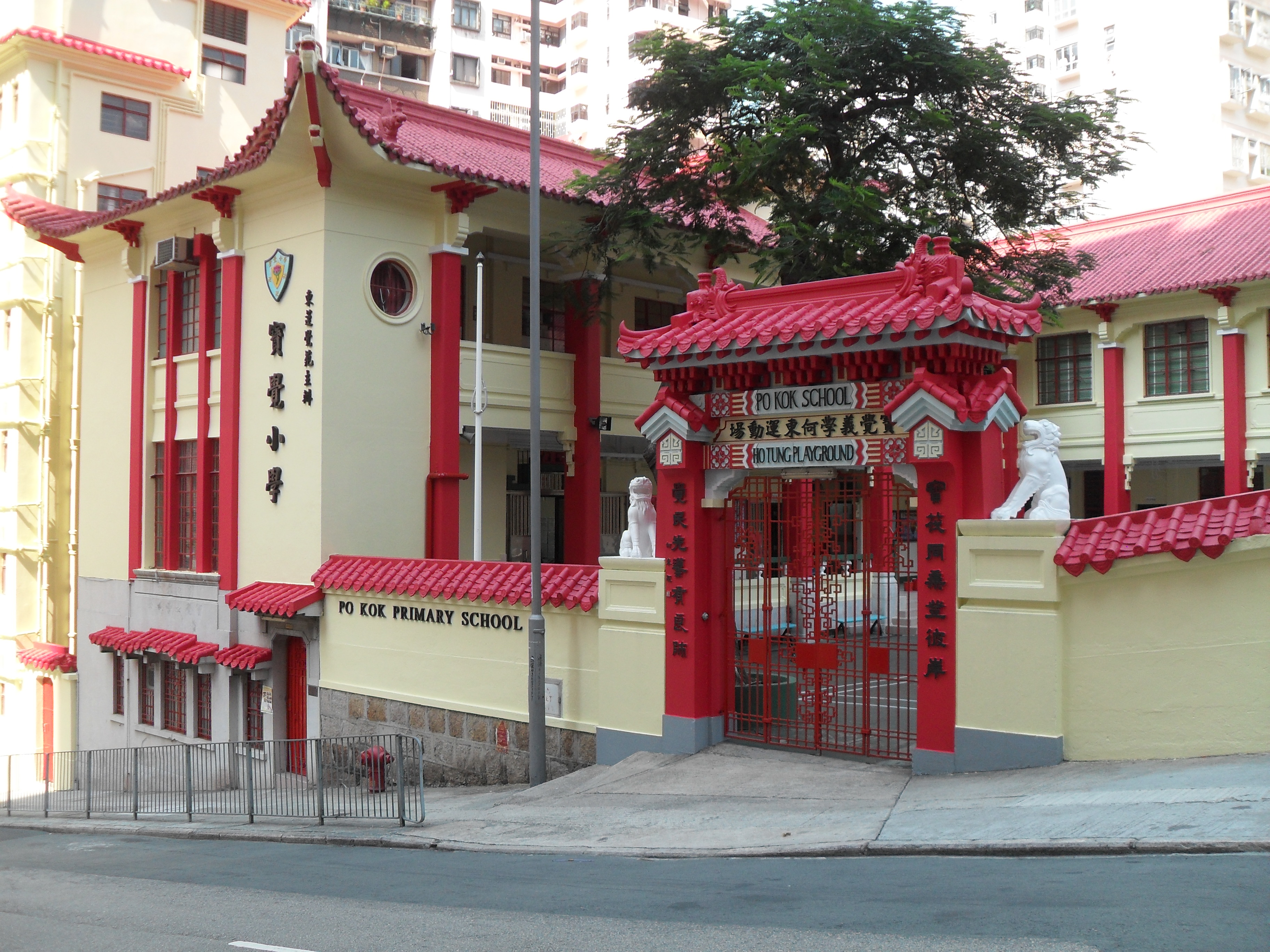
Po Kok Primary School.

Lady Clara Ho Tung officially established the Po Kok Free School for Girls in Causeway Bay in Hong Kong and Macau in 1931. In 1935 the school was moved to a temple also founded by Lady Clara in Happy Valley, next to its present site in Tung Lin Kok Yuen. The school facilities aimed to provide women with the opportunity to receive education and also promote Buddhism. In 2004 the Po Kok Primary School faced trouble and was ordered to cease operating its Primary One class due to lack of enrolment, however after an out-of-court settlement the school was allowed to continue the class with its own funding In 2005 the school met the threshold of 23 student needed for operation. Overall the Temple has three schools in its management: the Po Kok Secondary School in Tseung Kwan O, Po Kok Primary in Happy Valley and Po Kok Branch School in Hung Shui Kiu, Yuen Long. Historical figures show that education standards are high at Po Kok Schools, in 1959 and 1960 over 90 per cent of each graduating class of the middle school passed the Chinese School- leaving certificate examination and nearly a third of those achieved a distinction.

== Tung Lin Kok Yuen, Canada Society ==
Tung Lin Kok Yuen, Canada Society is a non-profit charitable organisation registered with the Government of Canada in Ottawa, Ontario. It was established in Vancouver, British Columbia by current chairman of the board of directors of Tung Lin Kok Yuen, Robert H. N. Ho. in 1994, aiming to promote Buddhist education internationally.

=== Location ===
The Tung Lin Kok Yuen, Canada Society headquarters is on Victoria Drive, not far from downtown Vancouver. Vancouver was chosen as an ideal location for the first international branch of Tung Lin Kok Yuen because of the large number of immigrants, many of Chinese ethnicity there. Tung Lin Kok Yuen, Canada Society was therefore founded to meet the religious needs of the population as well as to provide an accessible venue for Buddhists and general public to come together and share the value of Buddhism. Indeed, the establishment of the Canada society coincided with a period of marked increase in the number of Buddhists residing in Vancouver – official figures recording a rise of 84% in the ten-year period spanning 1991 to 2001.

=== Structure and facilities ===
The temple is a contemporary building of over twenty thousand square feet and consists of two main sections. One houses a Worship Hall, Longevity Hall (Hall of the Medicine Buddha), Meditation Hall, Memorial Hall, library, offices, living quarters, vegetarian kitchen and a Multi-Purpose Hall which can be used for conferences, exhibitions, cultural performances, lectures and seminars. This section also houses a retail shop selling Buddhist artefacts. Another section houses an ancestral hall, a function hall, small meditation rooms as well as a garden.

=== Tung Lin Kok Yuen Foundation ===
In 2004, the Tung Lin Kok Yuen Foundation was established. The aim of the establishment is to promote Buddhist education to the tertiary education sector in Canada and since 2005, several Canadian universities have been sponsored by the foundation for their Buddhist programs.

Robert Hung-Ngai Ho established the foundation aiming to form a "global network" of Buddhist studies scholars and institutions, making maximum use of modern communication technologies. His goal is to establish Centres of Buddhist Studies at major universities in the globe which can share and exchange information according to each speciality in the school. Such centres have already been established in Hong Kong and Canada, and there has been plans to expand such network to universities in the U.S. and Europe.
