= List of the oldest buildings and structures in Hong Kong =

The following is a list of the oldest buildings and structures in Hong Kong.

== Before 1800 ==
Although Hong Kong was sparsely populated prior to the arrival of the British, the area has a number of historic structures:

Building	Year completed	Builder	Source	Location
Lei Cheng Uk Han Tomb Museum	25-220AD			Sham Shui Po District
Tung Chung Fort	1174–1189			Tung Chung
Tin Hau Temple, Joss House Bay	1266			Sai Kung District
Tsui Sing Lau Pagoda	15th century			Ping Shan
Tang Ancestral Hall	14th century			Ping Shan
Yu Kiu Ancestral Hall	16th century			Ping Shan
Sau Choi Mansion				Ping Shan
Law Uk Folk Museum	18th century			Chai Wan
Tung Lung Fort	1719–1724			Sai Kung District
Fan Lau Fort	1729			Lantau
Entrance Tower of Ma Wat Wai				Fanling
Kun Lung Gate Tower	1744			Fanling
Sam Tung Uk	1786			Tsuen Wan

== 19th century ==
Most of the buildings built during this period was by the British and mostly on Hong Kong Island and the Kowloon Peninsula:

Building	Year completed	Builder	Style	Source	Location
Yeung Hau Temple	1811				Ha Tsuen
Tung Chung Battery	1817				Tung Chung
Stanley Fort	1840s?		Victorian		Stanley
Victoria Barracks, Hong Kong	1840s–1874		Victorian		Central
Victoria Prison	1841		Victorian		Central
Murray House	1844	Major Aldrich and Lieutenant Collinson of the Royal Engineers	Classical		re-located to Stanley from Central
Flagstaff House	1846		Colonial		Central
remains of the Kowloon Walled City and Yamen Building	1847				Kowloon
St. John's Cathedral, Hong Kong	1847		Victorian Gothic		Central
Bishop's House	1848		Tudor Revival		Central
Government House, Hong Kong	1855	Charles St George Cleverly	Colonial / Japanese		Central
Old Stanley Police Station	1859	Victorian			Stanley
University Hall (University of Hong Kong)	1861		Tudor and Gothic	Douglas Lapraik	Pok Fu Lam
Central Police Station – Barracks block	1864		Colonial		Central
Fat Tong Chau Old Chinese Customs Station	1868				Junk Island, Sai Kung
Cape D'Aguilar Lighthouse	1875				Cape D'Aguilar
Green Island Lighthouse Compound	1875, 1905				Green Island, Hong Kong
Hong Kong Observatory	1883		Colonial		Tsim Sha Tsui
Former Marine Police Headquarters Compound	1884		Colonial		Tsim Sha Tsui
Lei Yue Mun Fort	1887				Lei Yue Mun
Cathedral of the Immaculate Conception (Hong Kong)	1888	Crawley and Company	Gothic Revival		Mid-Levels
Old Dairy Farm Depot	1892	Danby & Leigh	Eclectic architectural		Central
Waglan Lighthouse	1893				
Old Tai Po Police Station	1899				Tai Po

== Early 20th century ==
Building	Year completed	Builder	Style	Source	Location
Ohel Leah Synagogue	1901–1902		Colonial Sephardic		Mid-levels
Former Kowloon British School	1902		Victorian		Tsim Sha Tsui
Gate Lodge	1902–1904		Renaissance		Victoria Peak
Old British Military Hospital	1903				Mid-Levels
Old Pathological Institute	1905				Mid-Levels
Western Market	1906		Edwardian		Central
St. Andrew's Church (Kowloon)	1906		Victorian-Gothic		Tsim Sha Tsui
Old District Office North	1907				Tai Po
Signal Hill Tower	1907				Tsim Sha Tsui
Clock Tower, Hong Kong	1910		Greek-revival		Tsim Sha Tsui
Central Police Station – HQ Block, Blocks A-D	1910				Central
University of Hong Kong Main Building	1910–1912	Leigh & Orange			Mid-levels
Legislative Council Building	1912	Sir Aston Webb	Neo-Classical		Central
Old Wan Chai Post Office	1912–1913		Greek-revival		Wan Chai
Former Central Magistracy	1913–1914		Greek-revival		Central
Elliot Hall, University of Hong Kong	1914		Edwardian		Mid-Levels
Ex-Commodore's House	1914		Neoclassicism		Central
Dr. Sun Yat-sen Museum	1914		Greek-revival		Central
May Hall, University of Hong Kong	1915		Edwardian		Mid-Levels
The Main Building, The Helena May	1916				Central
Former French Mission Building	1917		Neoclassical		Central
Hung Hing Ying Building, the University of Hong Kong	1919		Neoclassical		
North Block of St. Joseph's College	1920				Central
Old Kowloon Fire Station	1920				Tsim Sha Tsui
Main Building at St. Stephen's Girls' College	1923				Mid-Levels
Pedder Building	1923				Central
Sham Shui Po Police Station	1924				Sham Shui Po
Central Police Station Stable Block	1925				Tsim Sha Tsui
West Block of St. Joseph's College	1925				Central
Yau Ma Tei Police Station	1925				Yau Ma Tei
The Church of Christ in China Hop Yat Church 合一堂	1926				Tsim Sha Tsui
The Peninsula Hong Kong	1928				Tsim Sha Tsui
Tang Chi Ngong Building, the University of Hong Kong	1929				
Diocesan Boys' School	1929				Mongkok/ Ho Man Tin
Shum Residence (General House, Hip Wai House, & Shum Ancestral Hall)(上將府主樓)	1932		Mixed		Fung Kat Heung, Kam Tin, Yuen Long, New Territories
Fanling Lodge	1934	Public Works Department	Mixed		Fanling
The Haw Par Mansion	1935		Chinese Renaissance		Tai Hang
Tung Lin Kok Yuen	1935		Chinese Renaissance		Happy Valley
Morrison Building in Hoh Fuk Tong Centre	1936				Tuen Mun
King Yin Lei	1937	A.R. Fenton-Rayen	Chinese Renaissance		Mid-Levels
Holy Trinity Cathedral	1937		Chinese Traditional		Kowloon City

== Post-World War II ==
Building	Year completed	Builder	Source	Location
Bank of China Building	1952			Central
City Hall, Hong Kong	1962			Central
Edinburgh Place Ferry Pier	1957			Central
Tsim Sha Tsui Ferry Pier	1957			Tsim Sha Tsui
Queen's Pier	1957	Ron Phillips and Alan Fitch		Central
Central Government Offices	1957			Central

== See also ==
- Declared monuments of Hong Kong
- Heritage conservation in Hong Kong
- Old Industrial Buildings Revitalization in Hong Kong
