= State Theatre (Hong Kong) =

Former cinema in Hong Kong

Coordinates: 22.290377°N 114.195446°E

- 皇都戲院
- State Theatre Building was activation in November 2026.

General information
- Classification: Grade I historic building
- Location: North Point, 277-291 King's Road, Hong Kong
- Opened: 1952
- Closed: 1997

State Theatre
- Traditional Chinese: 皇都戲院
Transcriptions
Yue: Cantonese
- Yale Romanization: Wòhng dōu hei yún
- Jyutping: Wong4 dou1 hei3 jyun2

Empire Theatre
- Traditional Chinese: 璇宮戲院
Transcriptions
Yue: Cantonese
- Yale Romanization: Syùhn gūng hei yún
- Jyutping: Syun4 gung1 hei3 jyun2

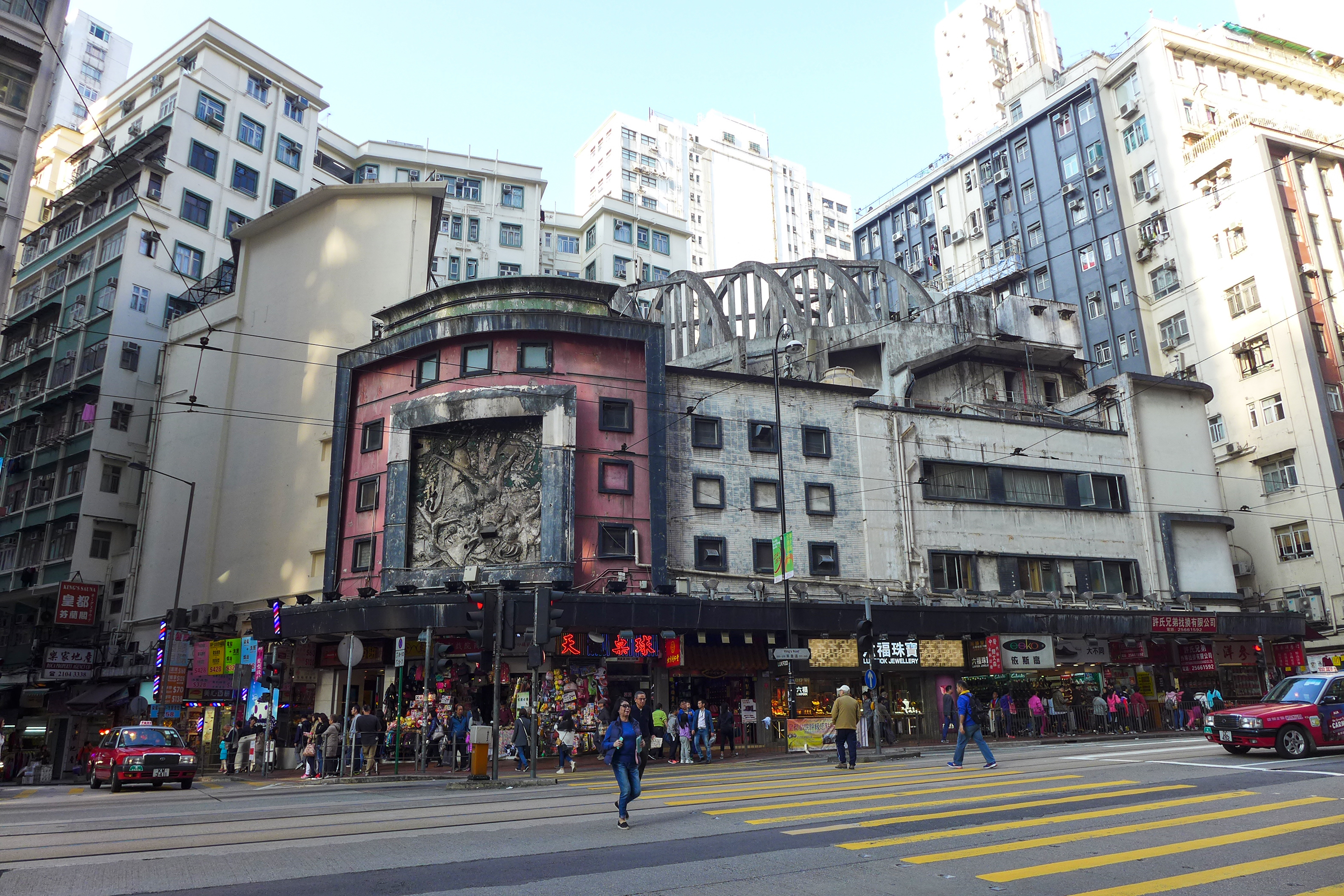
State Theatre Building along King's Road in January 2017.

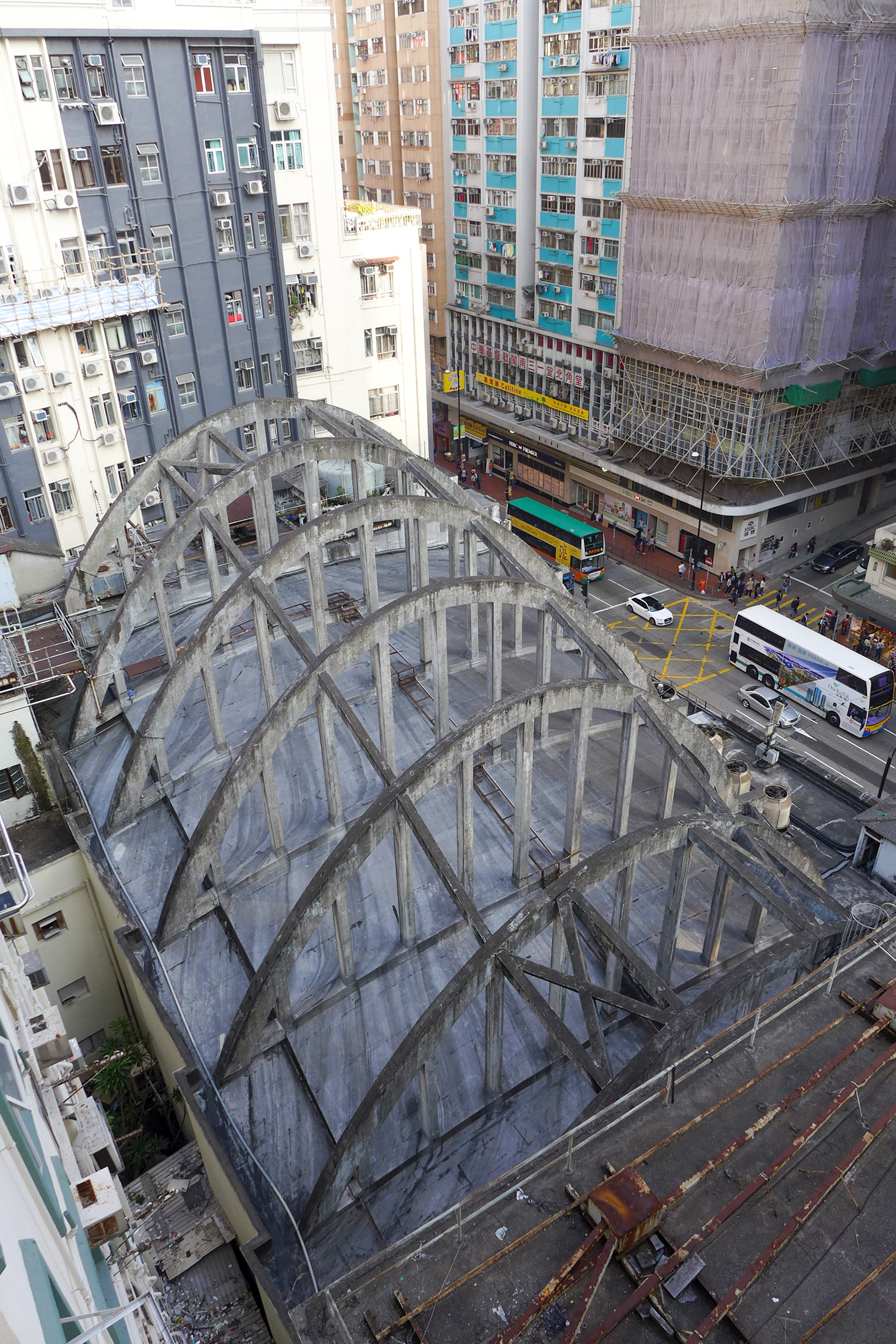
The special features of the roof

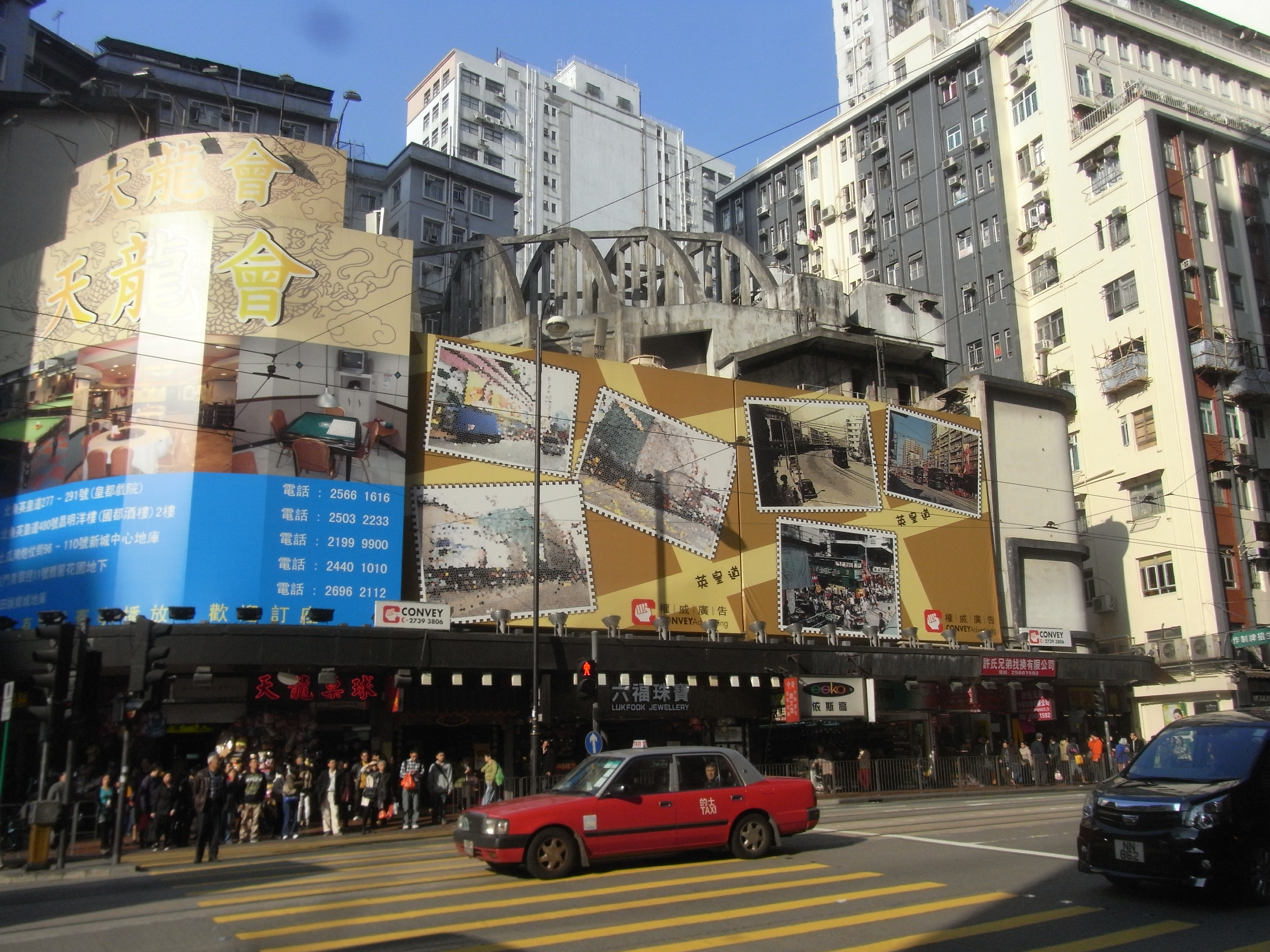
State Theatre Building along King's Road in 2013.

The State Theatre is a former cinema in Hong Kong. It is located in the North Point area along King's Road (nos. 277–291). Concerns were raised in 2015 that it may be demolished in the near future. The building was listed as a Grade I historic building in March 2017.

== History ==
The design of the State Theatre was overseen by architects George W. Grey and Liu Sun-fo (Chinese: 劉新科). The cinema opened in December 1952 as the Empire Theatre. It closed in 1957, and reopened in 1959 as the State Theatre, following extensive renovations. The State Theatre closed in 1997.

== Redevelopment and conservation ==
Since July 2015 New World Development has been progressively buying out the numerous shops on the ground floor of the former theatre, with a view of demolishing the building for redevelopment. In response Docomomo International has included the building on its 'Heritage in danger' list since 23 March 2016, in particular citing its unique "parabola-like" concrete arches above its roof.

On 23 March 2016, Docomomo International, an international non-profit organization on conservation, published a "Cultural Heritage Danger Warning", stating that since State Theatre is an important modern architectural building with a unique rooftop structure, it should not be demolished. The news caught the attention of the public. Heritage conservation organisations, such as Walk in Hong Kong, Docomomo Hong Kong and Conservancy Association, published a joint statement, urging the Antiquities Advisory Board (AAB) to grade the State Theatre as, at the very least, a Grade I Historic Building. The AAB convened a meeting on 18 April 2016, discussing the grade of State Theatre. Before the convention of the meeting, some organisations handed in petition letters to Andrew Lam Siu-lo, the chairman of the AAB, demanding the AAB to grade the State Theatre as a Grade I Historic Building. During the meeting, the AMO stated that the internal structure of the Theatre was changed to a large extent, losing the original function of the Theatre and having a relatively low value. Therefore, it believed that the |State Theatre should be graded as a Grade III Historic Building. However, other members believed that it should be assessed with higher grades. The AAB finally decided to postpone the motion.

Walk in Hong Kong later wrote several times, criticising that the AMO's grading was unprofessional and non-transparent. During the meeting on 18 April 2016, after being asked follow-up questions by other members, the AMO admitted that it did not fully understand the internal structural change of State Theatre and only made a guess. Later, Walk in Hong Kong invited heritage conservation experts to check the records related to the Theatre's internal structural change and visit the Theatre, proving that the internal structure of the Theatre was intact.

On 8 December 2016, the AAB believed that State Theatre had unique value. It overruled suggestions of the Antiquities and Monuments Office, a government department, after voting by other members and graded the Theatre as a Grade I Historic Building.

On 9 March 2017, the AAB declared State Theatre as a Grade I Historic Building. In December 2017, Walk in Hong Kong suggested that the central ventilation corridor could be moved to 16 meters above the Theatre so that the Theatre could be preserved while the developers could build a multi-storey building of 22 floors. Walk in Hong Kong also suggested that the Theatre could be altered as an indoor sports ground for activities such as rock climbing, skiing and zip lining. Another suggestion is to turn the Theatre into a living room, providing citizens with shared stress-relieving space.

On 8 October 2020, New World Development which was granted ownership rights hired 3 architectural firms to draft proposals related to conservation for and development of State Theatre: (1) Purcell, the British architectural firm which won the UNESCO Asia Pacific Heritage Awards for its design for Tai Kwun; (2) Wilkinson Eyre, the British architectural firm which was responsible for construction alteration projects of the Weston Library of the University of Oxford and King's Cross Gasholder in London; and (3) AGC Design Ltd., the local firm that was part of Lui Sun Chun's conservation project.

In April 2021, New World Development held an exhibition called "Finding your, my, his or her State" for one month before the implementation of the conservation project of State Theatre. The entry became a vintage ticket office. The staff would distribute generic tickets and tickets with advanced booking to visitors. The internal shops became exhibits of historic products related to the building, including generic Theatre seats, old tickets, movie posters etc. The developer also preserved one of the historic shops called "State Hair Salon".

== In films ==
The State Theatre was featured in the 1978 film Game of Death starring Bruce Lee and in the 1998 film The Longest Summer, directed by Fruit Chan.

== See also ==
- List of cinemas in Hong Kong
