= Ho Tung Gardens =

Villa on the Peak, Hong Kong

Ho Tung Gardens 何東花園
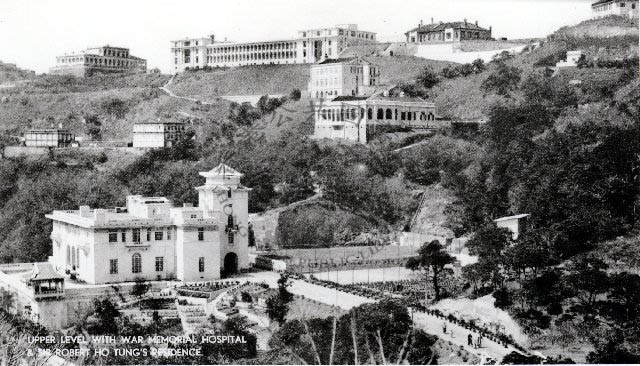
- Ho Tung Gardens (foreground left)

- Location within Hong Kong
- Alternative names: Hiu Kok Yuen (曉覺園)

General information
- Type: Villa + gardens with pagoda
- Architectural style: Chinese Renaissance
- Location: The Peak, Hong Kong, 75 Peak Road, Hong Kong
- Coordinates: 22.2640°N 114.1525°E
- Construction started: 1927
- Completed: 1937
- Renovated: 1946
- Demolished: 24 October 2013
- Owner: Ho Min-kwan

Technical details
- Floor count: 2 (villa); 5 (pagoda)

Design and construction
- Architecture firm: Palmer and Turner Architects

Hong Kong Graded Building – Grade I
- Designated: 2011-01-25

Ho Tung Gardens, also known by its Cantonese name 'Hiu Kok Yuen', was a villa on the Peak, Hong Kong. It was built by Robert Hotung and his wife Clara in 1927. They referred to it as "The Falls", but it later became known as Ho Tung Gardens.

In 2011, it was listed as a Grade I historic building by the Antiquities Advisory Board (AAB). Invoking the relevant section of the Antiquities and Monuments Ordinance for the fourth time in history, it was declared a "proposed historic monument" by the Government of Hong Kong in 2011. Negotiations between the owner and the government to save the mansion failed, and demolition work was completed in October 2013.

== Etymology ==
While the property is known by the name of 'Ho Tung Gardens' in Chinese (何東花園) after its original owner, the property's alternative given Chinese name is "Hiu Kok Yuen" (曉覺園) – an amalgam of names of Ho and his second wife, Clara. Hotung's alternative Chinese name Hiu-sang (何曉生); his wife was Cheung Lin-kok (何張蓮覺).

== History ==
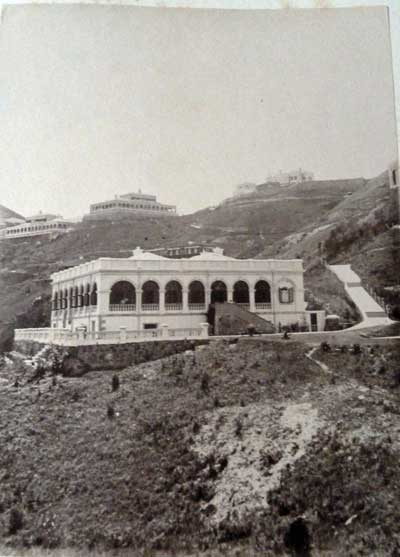
The Fall (1887–1927) – precursor to Ho Tung Gardens

=== Plot history ===
The site, reported to be a 120,000-square-foot (11,000 m^{2}) lot, was originally known as "The Falls", because of a stream in the vicinity. Originally owned by C.D. Wilkinson, the site was sold to Ho in about 1923 or 1924. Its street address at the time was 82 Aberdeen Road, RBL No. 28. and was changed in 1924 to No. 254. Later, it became No. 75 Peak Road. Lease plans of 1923 and 1928 indicate that the mansion of Ho Tung Gardens was built on the foundations of "The Falls".

=== Construction ===
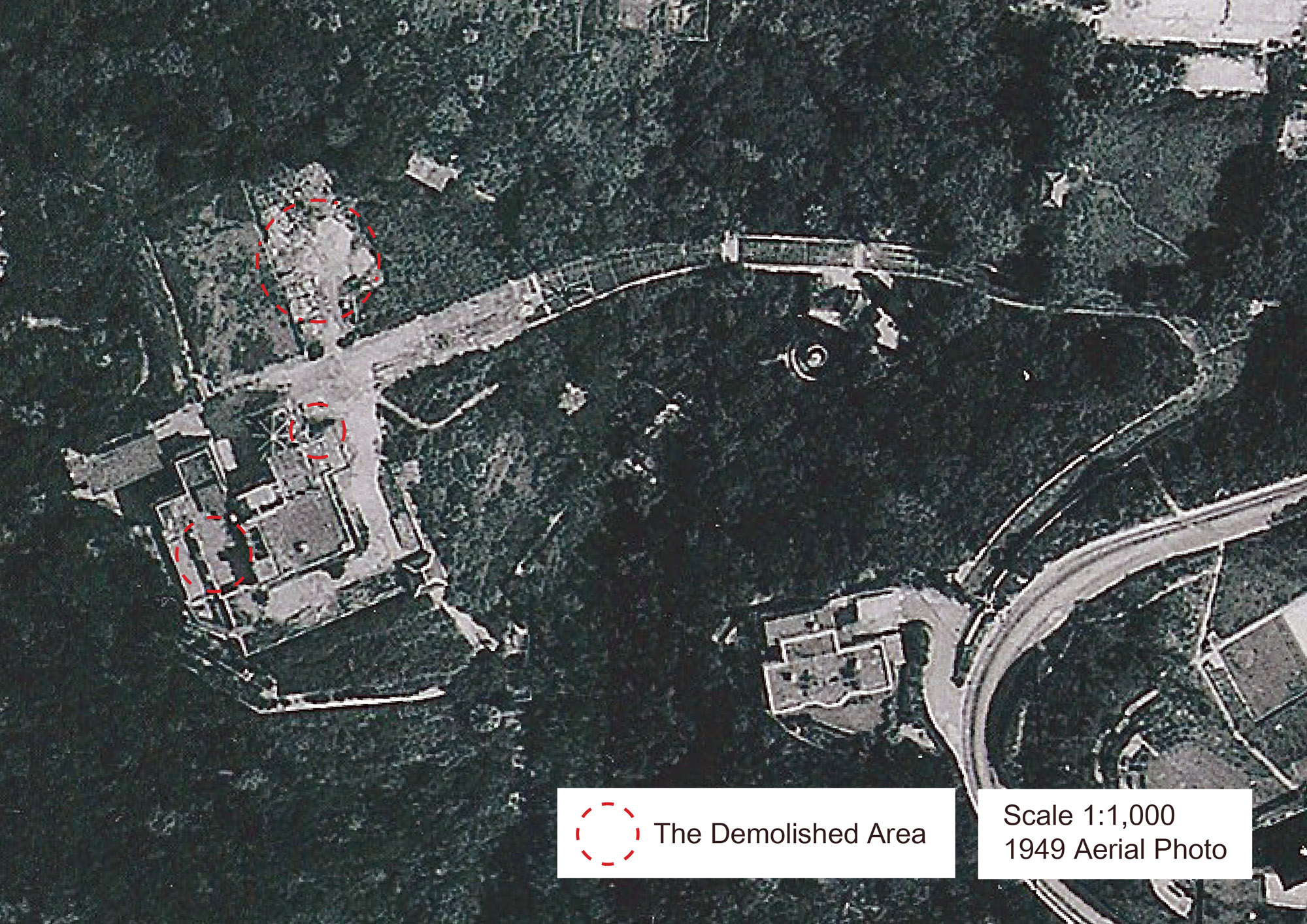
Aerial photograph of the site in 1949

The 4,000 square feet residence was constructed between 1927 and 1938. The compound was designed by Palmer and Turner Architects, a noted architectural practice, in a Chinese Renaissance style. It is known that the 2-storey main building was built in 1927, whilst parts of the gardens, in particular the ornamental gateway, were completed in 1938, after the death of Lady Hotung. Within the extensive gardens are a pavilion and a 5-storey pagoda, built with reinforced concrete and Chinese roof-tiles. One of the pavilions in the gardens also house calligraphy by Qing Dynasty officials, Zeng Guofan and Zuo Zongtang.

=== Uses and visitors ===
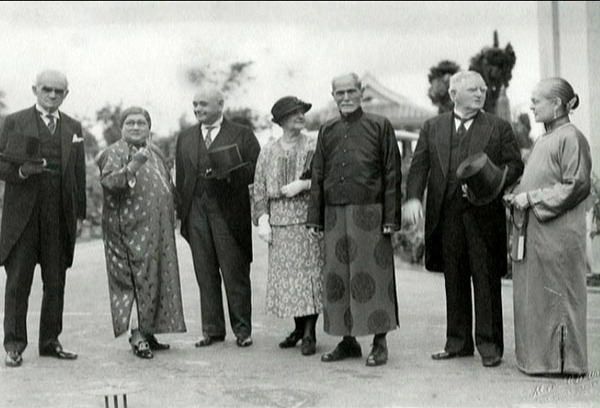
Robert Hotung (3rd right) with John Nance Garner (2nd right) at Ho Tung Gardens in 1935; wives Margaret (2nd left) and Clara (1st right) both in cheongsam

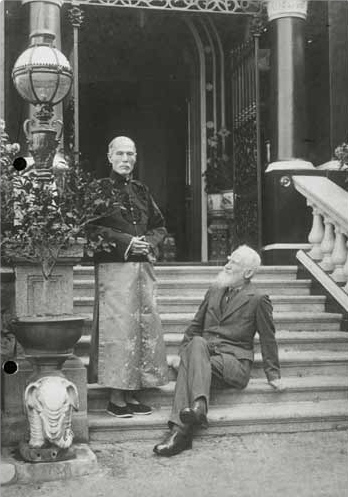
Hotung (left) with George Bernard Shaw (right) in Hong Kong in 1933

According to the Peak Reservation Ordinance, only Europeans were allowed to live on Victoria Peak. Hotung, who was half-European and half-Chinese, was already living on the Peak when the law was enacted. Ho had a retreat on The Peak named "The Neuk", at 48 Aberdeen Road, but he primarily lived at a property named "Idlewild" at 8 Seymour Road in the city. Ho never lived in Ho Tung Gardens.

As a prominent businessman at the time, Hotung received many famous visitors at the villa, including George Bernard Shaw; US Vice President John Nance Garner visited in 1935. It was commandeered as a military base to fight the Japanese Imperial Army in 1941. Parts of the structure, including the roof, were damaged in heavy fighting and the building became dilapidated thereafter. In 1946, Hotung sought compensation from the government for the damage; the building was then renovated several times. The property has been extensively modified.

Hotung's son, Robert, lived on the property between the 1960s and 1990s, and ownership passed onto granddaughter Ho Min-kwan in 2003.

== 2010s ==
The owner, Hotung's granddaughter, applied for permission to redevelop in mid-2010; technical approval was gained from the Buildings Department in December 2010 as it satisfied planning requirements. According to building plan submitted – by the original firm that designed the villa, 11 blocks of four-storey houses would be built; a total floor area would be 60,000 square feet. The case came before the Antiquities Advisory Board in July 2010, where it was listed as a Grade I historic building, although such declaration does not confer statutory protection. In late January 2011, the Government of Hong Kong invoked the Antiquities and Monuments Ordinance for the fourth time in history, declared it a "proposed historic monument", thus imposing a 12-month moratorium on redevelopment of the site, pending negotiations with the owner. In October 2011, two government consultancy reports, by experts at the University of Hong Kong and submitted to the Antiquity Advisory Board, concluded that it has high historical and architectural value. On 24 October 2011, the Antiquities Advisory Board approved the government proposal to declare the Ho Tung Gardens on the Peak a monument. Bernard Chan, Chairman of the AAB argued to preserve the mansions because "The choice of a very Chinese-looking style of architecture for the new house in 1927 ... was a statement that a racial barrier was being broken. It was also a declaration by Hotung that he was different from his neighbors, who were only living in the colony temporarily before going home." However, some other architectural historians believe that the mansion is an ordinary piece of architecture at the time that cannot be compared with other examples of "Chinese Renaissance" architecture such as King Yin Lei and Haw Par Mansion.

In December 2011, the government announced that it would declare Hotung Gardens a protected monument prior to the expiry of the temporary injunctive declaration made in January. This put the government at loggerheads with the site's owner, who insisted on retaining the site and living in one of the ten units she wished to have built there. Ho Min-kwan argued that the existing main building is "unexceptional ... does not have the requisite historical or architectural value or authenticity; it is not a rare example of an architectural style, and it is not a distinctive building structure." She also noted that her grandfather never lived there, and that the main building had already been converted into six apartments.

The government announced in early December 2012 that it would not declare the house a monument after all. The secretary for development, Paul Chan admitted a policy failure and said the government believed that "not everyone would agree with spending billions of dollars of public money on private heritage sites" – the valuation was between HK$3 billion and 7 billion. Demolition work of the principal building started in July 2013 and was completed in late October, paving the way for construction of a series of town houses on the site.

Ho Tung Gardens was sold in February 2015 for a sum of HKD5.1 billion. At HKD82,258 per sq.ft of buildable area, this marks the most expensive residential plot sold by private tender in Hong Kong. The sale also shone the global spotlight on the property, with the deal placing Peak Road atop the list of 'The World's Top 10 Most Exclusive Streets' in survey results released in July 2015 by Billionaire.com – notably above Upper Fifth Avenue in the United States and Knightsbridge in London. The new buyer is alleged to be Cheung Chung Kiu, Chairman of C C Land Holdings Ltd. The 120,000 sq.ft site is expected to be redeveloped, and as per Cap 117 Part IIIA Division 5 of the Stamp Duty Ordinance, will grant the buyer a refund of HKD980 million in stamp duty should the redevelopment go ahead.

== See also ==
- Ho Tung Lau
