= Antiquities Authority, Hong Kong =

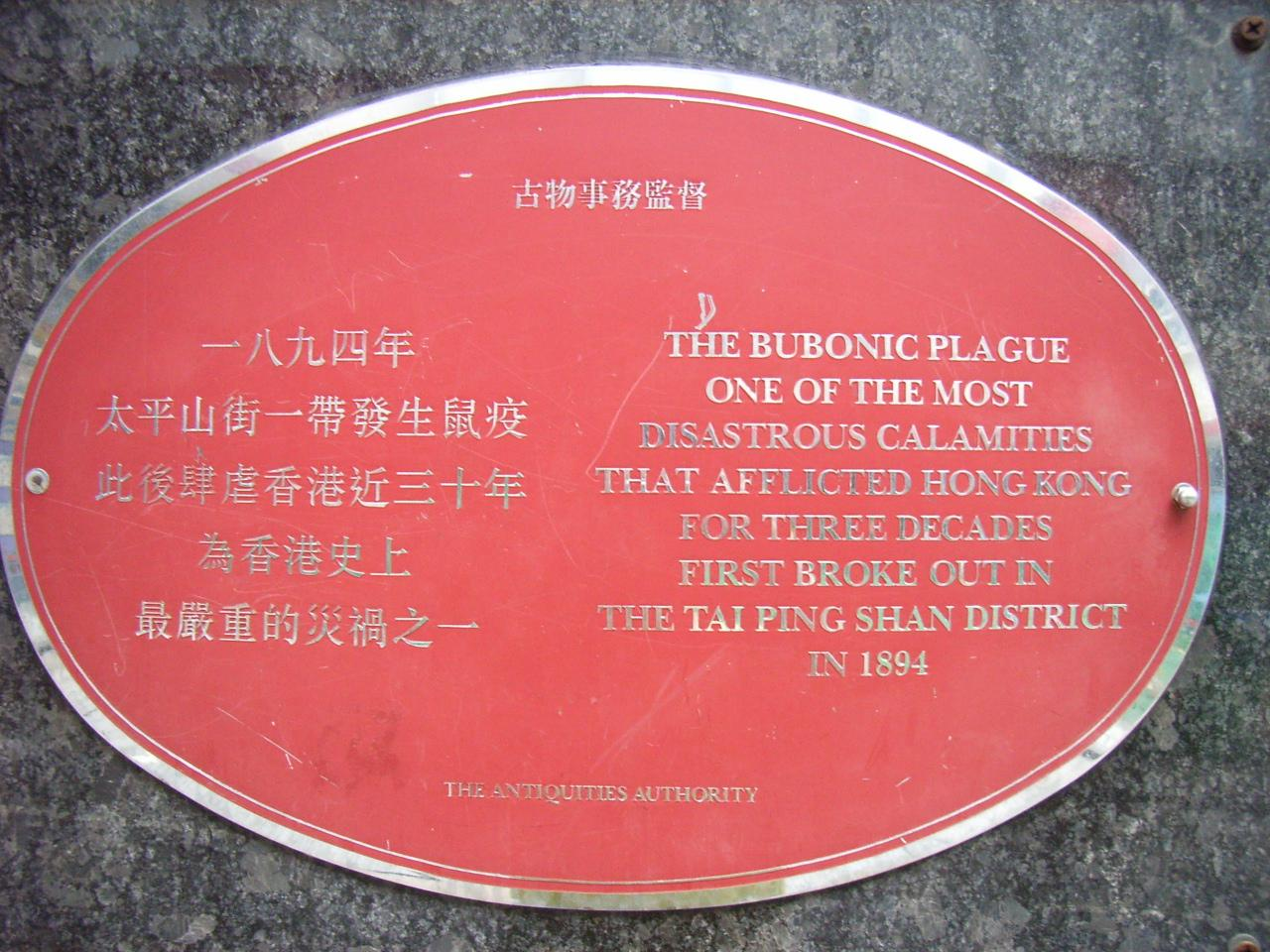
Plaque of the Antiquities Authority at Blake Garden

The Antiquities Authority (Chinese: 古物事務監督) is a statutory role under the Antiquities and Monuments Ordinance, Cap. 53, enacted in 1971, and effective since 1976. Since 2007, the Antiquities Authority is the Secretary for Development.

== History ==
The Antiquities Authority has been attached to different senior government posts over time:

- 1976-1982: Secretary for Home Affairs in respect of Hong Kong and Kowloon, and the Secretary for the New Territories in respect of the New Territories
- 1982-1985: Director of Urban Services
- 1985-1989: Secretary for Municipal Services
- 1989-1996: Secretary for Recreation and Culture
- 1996-1998: Secretary for Broadcasting, Culture and Sport
- 1998-2007: Secretary for Home Affairs
- Since July 2007: Secretary for Development

== Connection to other entities ==
The Antiquities Advisory Board is an independent statutory body established under section 17 of the Antiquities and Monuments Ordinance to advise the Antiquities Authority on any matters relating to antiquities, proposed monuments or monuments or referred to it for consultation.

The Antiquities and Monuments Office is the executive arm of the Antiquities Authority.
