= Antiquities Advisory Board =

Hong Kong antiquitarian organization

- 古物諮詢委員會

Statutory body overview
- Formed: 1976; 50 years ago
- Jurisdiction: Hong Kong
- Headquarters: 136 Nathan Road, Tsim Sha Tsui, Kowloon
- Minister responsible: SO Cheung-tak, Douglas (zh), Chairman
- Parent Statutory body: Antiquities Authority (Secretary for Development)
- Website: aab.gov.hk

Antiquities Advisory Board
- Traditional Chinese: 古物諮詢委員會
- Simplified Chinese: 古物谘询委员会
Transcriptions
Standard Mandarin
- Hanyu Pinyin: Gǔwù Zīxún Wěiyuánhuì
Yue: Cantonese
- Yale Romanization: Gú maht jī sēun wái yùhn wúi
- Jyutping: Gu^{2} mat^{6} zi^{1} seon^{1} wai^{2} jyun^{4} wui^{2}

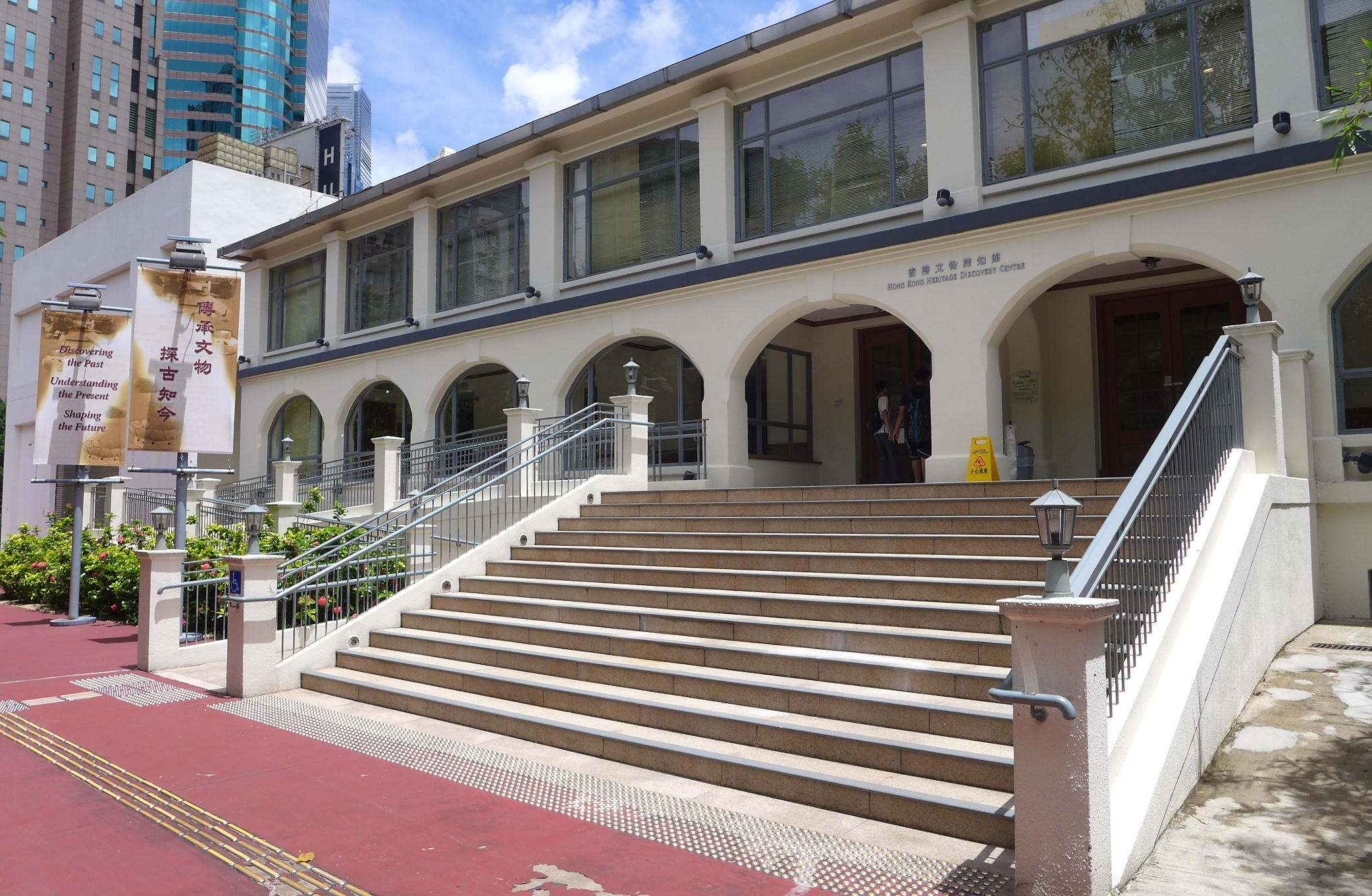
Meetings of the AAB are held in the conference room of the Hong Kong Heritage Discovery Centre in Kowloon Park, Tsim Sha Tsui.

The Antiquities Advisory Board (AAB) is a statutory body of the Hong Kong Special Administrative Region with the responsibility of advising the Antiquities Authority on any matters relating to antiquities and monuments. The AAB was established in 1976 along with the Antiquities and Monuments Office (AMO) when the Antiquities and Monuments Ordinance (Cap. 53) was enacted, and comprises members appointed by the Chief Executive. The corresponding governmental ministry is the Development Bureau, and executive support for the AAB is provided by the AMO which is under the Development Bureau.

== Formation ==
The Antiquities and Monuments Ordinance (Cap. 53) was passed in 1971. However, the ordinance was not "give[n] life" and the AAB was not constituted until February 1977.

According to section 17 of the Antiquities and Monuments Ordinance (Cap. 53), the AAB consists of members the Chief Executive may appoint, with one being appointed chairman by the chief executive. The ordinance does not mandate a minimum number of members, nor the qualifications to become a member.

Many of the members of the board are neither archaeologists nor historians, but are instead architects, academics, and former officials. The board consists of 20 members with effect from 1 January 2023 to 31 December 2024, as follows:

Member	Profession
SO Cheung-tak, Douglas (chairman)	Solicitor of Hong Kong
IP Chung-man, Tony	Architect
FU Chin-shing, Ivan	Architect
HO Kui-yip	Surveyor
YEUNG Wing-shan, Theresa	Urban planner
YUEN Siu-bun, Edward	Certified public accountant
YIP Ka-ming, Alice	Certified public accountant
SHUM Ho-kit	Solicitor and Chairman of the Yuen Long District Council
CHEUNG Tih-lin, Vanessa	Managing Director of Nan Fung Development Ltd
SEE Sau-mei, Salome	Executive Director of Hong Kong Economic Times Holdings
TSANG Chiu-tong, Brian	Entrepreneur
CHAN Chun-hung, Vincent	Senior Managing Director of Investment Group
Dr YEUNG Wai-shing, Frankie	Senior District Director at AIA International Ltd
Dr LEE Ching-yee, Jane	Social entrepreneur
SU Yau-on, Albert	Chief Executive for Tung Wah Group of Hospitals
Professor LI Chi-miu, Phyllis	Adjunct professor of geography at the University of Hong Kong
Professor CHEUNG Sui-wai	Professor of history at the Chinese University of Hong Kong
Dr LAM Weng-cheong	Assistant professor of anthropological archaeology at the Chinese University of Hong Kong
Professor CHU Hoi-shan	Professor of architecture at the Chu Hai Institute of Higher Education
Professor CHAN Ching, Selina	Professor of sociology at the Hong Kong Shue Yan University

== Role ==
The AAB advises the Antiquities Authority, double-hatted by the Secretary for Development since 2007, on: historical items to be declared as monument or a proposed monument under of the Antiquities and Monuments Ordinance (Cap. 53), how to restore and conserve the historical items, and promote the conservation of Hong Kong's heritage. In this role, it is responsible for "grading" historical buildings in Hong Kong according to a grading mechanism.

From the outset, the AAB was faced with difficulty in its work: problems arise when the AAB wishes to declare a proposed monument or monument in government properties which the government wish to develop, and private properties which the owners who felt that such declaration would "reduce their rights of ownership". The lack of transparency and enforcement power of the grading system also sparked controversy.

== Relationship with other government agencies ==
=== Relationship with the Antiquities and Monuments Office (AMO) and the Leisure & Cultural Services Department (LCSD) ===
The AMO offers secretarial and executive assistance to the AAB in preserving historic places with great archeological or historical importance. The AMO executes the advice made by the AAB, including executing the Chief Executive's decision to declare monuments, and thus is an important executive arm of the Antiquities Authority (i.e. Secretary for Development).

Both the AMO and the LCSD undergo identification, records, and research on crucial historical buildings, as well as organize and coordinate surveys and excavations in related areas. They provide professional advice regarding the protection of historical relics to the AAB by sitting on the AAB's regular meetings every 3 months.

=== Relationship with the Development Bureau and the Antiquities Authority ===
The Development Bureau is responsible for heritage conservation, while the Secretary for Development acts as the Antiquities Authority under s.2 of Antiquities and Monuments Ordinance (Cap. 53).

Under s.18 of the Antiquities and Monuments Ordinance (Cap. 53), the AAB gives a recommendation for the Antiquities Authority on matters relating to antiquities, proposed monuments or monuments under s.2A(1), s.3(1), and s.6(4) of the Antiquities and Monuments Ordinance (Cap. 53). Those matters include the declaration of proposed monuments, declaration of monuments, and exemptions of forbidden acts relating to certain monuments.

=== Relationship with the Chief Executive (CE) ===
S.17 of the Antiquities and Monuments Ordinance (Cap. 53) states that all members of the AAB, including the chairman, shall be appointed by the Chief Executive. Also, most AAB's advice made to the Antiquities Authority needs to seek the approval of the Chief Executive before execution. These decisions involve the extension of the duration of declared proposed monuments, declaration of monuments, and exemptions of prohibited actions concerning specific monuments according to s.2B(2), s.3(1), and s.6(4) of the Antiquities and Monuments Ordinance (Cap. 53) respectively.

== Controversies ==
=== Formation of the board ===
Members of the AAB have mainly been drawn from architects, academics and former officials. Amidst the demolition of the Edinburgh Place Ferry Pier in 2006, the AAB was criticized by conservationists on allegations that members did not thoroughly discuss proposals for preserving the Pier. In a subsequent review of conservation policy, the Home Affairs Bureau reviewed the composition of the AAB and increased the number of board members from 21 to 28. The Government also pledged to diversify the background of appointees and create a balanced mix of board members from various sectors and professions.

Criticisms of board membership resurfaced in the 2010s under accusations that the AAB was politicised amidst pro-government decisions. In June 2012, then-Chairman Bernard Chan gave a casting vote amidst a tie on the provisional grading of the West Wing of the Former Central Government Offices, leading to its classification as a grade II historical building. Chan was criticized for his tie-breaker vote that favoured the Government's position in demolishing the West Wing; Chan eventually resigned, citing a need to preserve the credibility of the board. Then-Secretary for Development Carrie Lam responded by arguing that conservation groups rallied irrational criticisms against board members. Criticisms continued after appointment of board members by then-Chief Executive Leung Chun-ying in 2013; the Conservancy Association voiced concerns over potential conflicts of interest as some appointees were considered supporters of Leung.

Critics also observed an inadequate degree of expertise in antiquities conservation among board members. Professor Ho Pui Yin, a former board member and socio-economic historian at the Chinese University of Hong Kong, made criticisms that some board members had little connection to the conservation of historical buildings and monuments; she observed that some appointed members had political stances and were conservative by considering antiquities in terms of economic values. Former member Ko Tim-keung also observed that the board had been oblivious to locations of military heritage. He criticized members that he perceived were inclined to grade historical buildings based on architectural appearance without paying due attention to the historical use of antiquities. In response to controversies over mistreatment of the Former Sham Shui Po Service Reservoir in 2021, board chairman Douglas So also indicated the possibility of reviewing the appointment mechanism of board members.

=== Problems of the Grading Mechanism ===
Currently, grades for historic buildings are defined as stated in the following:

- Grade I: "Buildings of outstanding merit, which every effort should be made to preserve if possible."
- Grade II: "Buildings of special merit; efforts should be made to selectively preserve."
- Grade III: "Buildings of some merit; preservation in some form would be desirable and alternative means could be considered if preservation is not practicable."

The AAB's grading system is criticized for its lack of power and transparency.

==== Grading Mechanism Lacking Power ====
The AAB and the AMO were accused that they only have the structural composition but not actual power. When it comes to the demolition of historic buildings, this important decision wholly depends on the government's discretion. The reasons are the AMO only distinguishes, records, and investigates different historic sites, while the AAB provides professional opinion to the Antiquities Authority as to whether a historic building should be declared as a monument. The Antiquities Authority reflects the advice for the Chief Executive and waits for his approval for declaration. The final and major decision power about the declaration of monuments rests on the Chief Executive and the Government. Grading of historical buildings is not binding the government regarding the monument's declaration and its demolition and serves only as a reference for the government to consider.

In the case of the Queen's Pier, although it was listed as a Grade I historic building, the government decided not to declare it as a monument due to various reasons, including the economic and urban development, as well as the lack of public support. The government also stated that the grading of Queen's Pier could not stop it from being demolished. At last, Queen's Pier was closed on 26 April 2007 to enable land reclamation and demolished in February 2008.

==== Grading Mechanism Being Non-transparent ====
While deciding the grading for these historic buildings on six main assessment criteria, namely historical interest, architectural merit, group value, social value, and local interest, authenticity, and rarity, the Assessment Panel considers the in-depth research, records, and analysis of the AMO on the heritage value of these structures.

However, whether or not the Assessment Panel follows these criteria is uncertain. The public could not get access to the AMO's "marking sheet" on the grading for the historic buildings. The public can barely look for the clues from clues. It is difficult to monitor the authorities. In the case of State Theatre, experts in the Assessment Panel showed varied interpretations of the grading criteria in a media interview: on historical interest, Hong Kong historian Professor Siu Kwok-kin questioned the worth of State Theatre when comparing other architectures, such as the Han dynasty tombs in the interview. On social value, Siu commented in the interview that "only people 50 years ago would go and see dramas". As for group value, architect Lor Hing Hung Louis questioned in the interview if the State Theatre was still worth having any collective memories, as even his son does not know Teresa Tang, a famous singer, anymore. Moreover, Lor even said ~~t~~hat he did not pay attention to the references. The disregard of the research materials conducted by the AMO creates further worries on the experts' ability to evaluate the historic importance of each building.

After the AAB has endorsed the suggested grading of the historic sites, the relevant information and proposed grading will be uploaded to the website of the AAB for a one-month public consultation. The AAB will consider all materials and opinions received during the public consultation before the confirmation of the proposed grading. While interest groups such as Walk in Hong Kong repeatedly sent letters to the AAB requesting a review of the grading, or to meet and communicate with the Assessment Panel, or to let more experts join the assessment process for the State Theatre, they received merely general bureaucratic replies and all their suggestions are rejected. The effectiveness and the transparency of the review mechanism is questionable.

== Notable cases ==
=== Queen's Pier (2006–2007) ===
The second-generation Queen's Pier was constructed on the Central harbourfront between 1953 and 1954 in a modern utilitarianist style. Its opening was officiated by the wife of then-Governor Sir Alexander Grantham on 28 June 1954. The Pier has since served as a ceremonial pier officiating landing ceremonies of members of the British royal family, including Queen Elizabeth II, Prince Philip and Prince Charles. The Pier has also been open for public use as a spot for social gathering and civic-political functions.

In conjunction with the proposed demolition of the Queen's Pier and the adjacent Edinburgh Place Ferry Pier necessitated by Phase III of the Central Reclamation project, the AMO commissioned a heritage impacts survey in 2001. The AAB, in two separate meetings in March 2002 and December 2006, reached the same view of not raising objections as to the demolition of the Queen's Pier. Instead, the board asked the government to preserve relics of the Queen's Pier for reconstruction on the reclaimed harbourfront.

The demolition of the adjacent Edinburgh Place Ferry Pier in December 2006 sparked public concerns over heritage conservation policies in Hong Kong. On 6 March 2007, the AAB agreed on a review of the Pier's grading and commissioned the AMO to conduct a study on the historic and heritage value of the Pier. Subsequently, the board convened an open meeting on 9 May 2007, in which the board adopted the AMO's report. The AAB by simple majority recommended the Pier to be graded as a grade I historic building on the grounds of historical significance and social value. In spite of conservationist campaigns and the AAB's grading recommendation, then-Secretary for Housing, Planning and Lands Michael Suen stated that the Pier must be removed from site before relocation; Suen further stated that the AAB's recommendation had no bearing on the Government's action. The Pier was closed at midnight on 26 April 2007. Amidst judicial reviews and a conservationist hunger strike, the Government applied for Legislative Council fundings to demolish the Pier and repossessed the Pier by 1 August. Demolition concluded in December 2007.

=== Ho Tung Gardens (2009–2020) ===
On 19 March 2009, the AAB announced that the expert panel completed the assessment on the heritage value of 1,444 buildings in Hong Kong. Ho Tung Gardens was assessed as a proposed Grade 1 building. Public consultation on the proposed grading for a 4-month period was commenced after the announcement. In July 2010, the sole owner of Ho Tung Gardens – Ho Min-kwan, wrote to express her disagreement on the proposed Grade 1 assessment and provide additional information for explanation. Her reasons were Sir Robert Ho Tung did not live in the Ho Tung Gardens and the interior of the building had already undergone considerable alterations. The expert panel still maintained the original view that Ho Tung Gardens warranted the Grade 1 status with its high heritage value since the Gardens was the only remaining local residence relating to Sir Robert Ho Tung and the Chinese Renaissance architectural style was rare in Hong Kong. The panel concluded by inviting the AAB to confirm the Grade 1 status.

In the latter part of 2010, the AAB was notified by the Buildings Department (BD) that the building and demolition plans regarding Ho Tung Gardens submitted by Ho Min-kwan were approved. Since the administrative Grade 1 status of Ho Tung Gardens did not afford it any statutory protection from demolition, the Secretary for Development in the capacity of Antiquities Authority, Carrie Lam, declared Ho Tung Gardens as proposed monument on 28 January 2011 with immediate effect for 12 months due to its high historic and architectural value. Being a proposed monument, Ho Tung Gardens was legally protected under the Antiquities and Monuments Ordinance (Cap. 53) prohibiting any building or other works on, or any actions to demolish, remove, obstruct, deface or interfere with the proposed monument unless a permit is granted by the Antiquities Authority. Ho Min-kwan then expressed the objection and submitted a petition to the Chief Executive according to the Antiquities and Monuments Ordinance (Cap. 53).

On 4 December 2011, then-Secretary for Development, Paul Chan, announced the final decision of the Chief Executive in Council that the declaration of Ho Tung Gardens as a monument shall not be made after considering the objection raised by the owner. The reasons were that the government had to strike a balance between private property rights and heritage conservation, and had to consider the potential consequences of resulting in litigation and a great amount of compensation. It subsequently failed to reach an agreement with the owner. This means that the building and demolition plans approved by the BD before can be carried out after Ho Tung Gardens ceases to be a proposed monument.

With the refusal to declare Ho Tung Gardens as a monument, the demolition work of the main building was completed in 2013. Subsequently, in 2015, Ho Tung Gardens was sold at HKD5.1 billion to a developer and half of the site was further sold at HKD3.3 billion in 2020.

=== State Theatre (2016–2020) ===
On 23 March 2016, Docomomo International, an international non-profit organization on conservation, published the "Cultural Heritage Danger Warning", stating that since State Theatre is an important modern architectural building with a unique rooftop structure, it should not be demolished. The news caught the attention of the public. Heritage conservation organisations, such as Walk in Hong Kong, Docomomo Hong Kong and Conservancy Association, published a joint statement, urging the AAB to grade the State Theatre as, at the very least, a Grade I Historic Building. The AAB convened a meeting on 18 April 2016, discussing the grade of State Theatre. Before the convention of the meeting, some organisations handed in petition letters to Andrew Lam Siu-lo, the chairman of the AAB, demanding the AAB to grade the State Theatre as a Grade I Historic Building. During the meeting, the AMO stated that the internal structure of the Theatre was changed to a large extent, losing the original function of the Theatre and having a relatively low value. Therefore, it believed that the State Theatre should be graded as a Grade III Historic Building. However, other members believed that it should be assessed with higher grades. The AAB finally decided to postpone the motion.

Walk in Hong Kong later wrote several times, criticising that the AMO's grading was unprofessional and non-transparent. During the meeting on 18 April 2016, after being asked follow-up questions by other members, the AMO admitted that it did not fully understand the internal structural change of State Theatre and only made a guess. Later, Walk in Hong Kong invited heritage conservation experts to check the records related to the Theatre's internal structural change and visit the Theatre, proving that the internal structure of the Theatre was intact.

On 8 December 2016, the AAB believed that State Theatre had unique value. It overruled the AMO's suggestion after voting by other members and graded the Theatre as a Grade I Historic Building.

On 9 March 2017, the AAB declared State Theatre as a Grade I Historic Building. In December 2017, Walk in Hong Kong suggested that the central ventilation corridor could be moved to 16 meters above the Theatre so that the Theatre could be preserved while the developers could build a multi-storey building of 22 floors. Walk in Hong Kong also suggested that the Theatre could be altered as an indoor sports ground for activities such as rock climbing, skiing and zip lining. Another suggestion is to turn the Theatre into a living room, providing citizens with shared stress-relieving space.

On 8 October 2020, New World Development which was granted ownership rights hired 3 architectural firms to draft proposals related to conservation for and development of State Theatre: (1) Purcell, the British architectural firm which won the UNESCO Asia Pacific Heritage Awards for its design for Tai Kwun; (2) Wilkinson Eyre, the British architectural firm which was responsible for construction alteration projects of the Weston Library of the University of Oxford and King's Cross Gasholder in London; and (3) AGC Design Ltd., the local firm that was part of Lui Sun Chun's conservation project.

In April 2021, New World Development held an exhibition called "Finding your, my, his or her State" for one month before the implementation of the conservation project of State Theatre. The entry became a vintage ticket office. The staff would distribute generic tickets and tickets with advanced booking to visitors. The internal shops became exhibits of historic products related to the building, including generic Theatre seats, old tickets, movie posters etc. The developer also preserved one of the historic shops called "State Hair Salon".

=== Ex-Sham Shui Po Service Reservoir (2021) ===
The Sham Shui Po Service Reservoir was a circular underground reservoir built at Bishop Hill, a hill to the north of Kowloon Tong, to service residents of Kowloon Tong, Sham Shui Po, and Tai Hang Tung. The Reservoir was completed on 10 August 1904 with a Romanesque architecture, a building style which was thought to have arrived in Hong Kong from Britain who inherited it from ancient Rome. The Reservoir terminated its service in 1970 when the larger Shek Kip Mei Fresh Water Service Reservoir, which had a larger storage, replaced its functions.

In 2017, the Water Supplies Department (WSD) realised the top of the underground Reservoir was cracked and tree roots breached the dome of the Reservoir, posing structural hazard to the entire establishment. After confirming the Reservoir was no longer in use and consulting the AMO who did not voice any objection, the WSD decided to demolish the Reservoir and redesignate the government land for general use by the Lands Department.

The AMO explained that it did not raise any objection in 2017 when the demolition was brought to its attention in a meeting because the WSD described the Reservoir as a disused "water tank". The WSD made no mention of its historic arches and cavernous architecture, and Heritage officials thought it was "just a normal tank".

The demolition work began in October 2020. By December 2020, the disused Reservoir was revealed to contain brick arches and a cement roof of a Romanesque architectural style. On 28 December 2020, a concerned group of citizens noticed the imminent destruction of the Reservoir. Determined to halt the demolition, some citizens approached the site and demanded the workers to stop the drilling, one even physically blocking the drilling machines from progressing. After much public outcry, the demolition was suspended the next day.

In June 2021, the Ex-Sham Shui Po Service Reservoir was accorded a Grade I historical building status by the AAB. The government currently organises guided and virtual tours through the Water Supplies Department. It has since been revealed that two other century-old reservoirs – the Hatton Road Service Reservoir and the Magazine Gap Road Service Reservoir – were demolished in 2011 and 2010 respectively, with no objection from the AMO.

=== Lui Seng Chun (2020–2022) ===
In 2000, the descendants of Lui Leung suggested donating Lui Seng Chun to the government. The AAB declared Lui Seng Chun as a Grade I Historic Building. On 7 October 2003, the government formally took over Lui Seng Chun.

In 2008, Lui Seng Chun became one of the 7 historic buildings under the Revitalizing Historic Buildings through Partnership Scheme. On 17 February 2009, the government of Hong Kong announced that the proposal of Hong Kong Baptist University was selected out of the 30 proposals regarding revitalizing the Lui Seng Chun plan.

The revitalization project was successfully completed in April 2012. Hong Kong Baptist University was granted a subsidy to develop Lui Seng Chun into "Hong Kong Baptist University Chinese Medicine Health Protection Center – Lui Seng Chun Hall" that combined Chinese medical services, public health education and historical culture. The first floor consists of the reception, manufacturing room and medicine storage room. The second and third floors consist of 3 clinics, 2 acupuncture and medical massage rooms. The corridors of all floors are used for exhibitions showing different themes. There is also a rooftop herbal garden for teaching and learning.

The Hall was formally opened to the public on 25 April 2012. Out-patient clinical services include internal medicine, orthopedics and traumatology, acupuncture and medical massage. There would also be regular free out-patient services for the needy. 20% of the quota of out-patient services would be reserved for applicants for the Comprehensive Social Security Assistance. In addition, the center would provide internship and training courses. In connection with the exhibitions of Hong Kong Baptist University Dr. & Mrs. Hung Hin Shiu Museum of Chinese Medicine, the center would provide tour services for different organisations at Lui Seng Chun Hall.

During revitalization, the original features of the building were preserved deliberately, such as the doors, windows and floors. In March 2022, the AAB recommended the declaration of Lui Seng Chun Hall as a statutory monument under the Antiquities and Monuments Ordinance.

== Timeline ==
Selected cases of heritage conservation are arranged in accordance with their latest development:

Year	Event
1970–1978	Kowloon Station Due to the rising demand of railway service, the railway terminus had to be expanded and relocated to Hung Hom. With protests and petition for preservation, the terminal building was still demolished in 1978. The Clock Tower retained was declared as a monument in 1990.
1977–1981	Hong Kong Club Building Demolition decision was made due to the deterioration of the building. With the preservation campaign, AAB recommended to declare the building as a monument while the Executive Council subsequently refused to endorse the recommendation. Hong Kong Club Building was demolished in 1981.
1980–2002	Murray House Murray House was originally assessed as a Grade 1 historic building. To accommodate the construction of the Bank of China Tower, Murray House was demolished in 1982. In 1988, the Housing Department resettled it in Stanley being the first resettlement project in Hong Kong. The rebuilt House was not qualified to be graded due to the international standard for heritage preservation.
1982 –	Nga Tsin Wai Village Since 1982, houses in the village were acquired and demolished separately by the developer. From 1994 to 2006, despite the demand from the public and the Wong Tai Sin District Council for the preservation of the Village, the AAB raised 4-time no objection to the redevelopment project. It was started in 2007 and the targeted completion is by 2023/24.
1989 –	Former French Mission Building The Former French Mission Building was declared a monument in 1989. In consultation with the AAB, the Architectural Services Department converted the building for use by the Court of Final Appeal to commence upon the handover of Hong Kong on 1 July 1997. The Building is currently pending adaptive reuse.
1995–2018	Central Police Station Compound, the Former Central Magistracy and the Victoria Prison Compound The three sites on Hollywood Road were declared as monuments in 1995. A revitalisation project on the sites began in 2011, during which the former Married Inspectors' Quarters partially collapsed. The AAB accepted a plan to demolish the collapsed section and reconstruct them with modern architecture. The sites re-opened as heritage and arts complex Tai Kwun in May 2018.
2001–2006	Edinburgh Place Ferry Pier The report of built heritage impact assessment 2001 recommended the reprovision of the Edinburgh Place Ferry Pier with no objection from AAB. It was demolished in 2006 since the pier was not a declared monument or a graded historical building.
2006–2007	Queen's Pier
2004–2008	King Yin Lei With the land exchange proposal, the owner surrendered the whole site of King Yin Lei to the government. It was declared as a monument in July 2008, and was included in Batch VI of the Revitalisation Scheme to explore the most suitable use of the building in 2019.
2007–2011	Wing Lee Street In 2007, the row of tenement buildings on the street was included in the redevelopment plan of the Urban Renewal Authority for demolition as they were not graded as historic buildings and regarded as having no architectural merits. While in 2010, after a local movie was filmed at Wing Lee Street and the public called for preservation in-situ, the Development Bureau announced that the street would be completely conserved.
2009–2011	West Wing of the Central Government Offices Subsequent to the relocation of the Government Secretariat to Tamar, the initial proposal of preserving the Main and East Wing while demolishing the West Wing of the former Central Government Office was recommended. There was controversy as to the grading of the West Wing. AAB confirmed the historical significance of the West Wing by conducting a Heritage Impact Assessment and eventually graded it as a Grade 1 historic building. The final decision was made in 2012 that the West Wing would also be preserved for the use of Department of Justice.
2014	To Kwa Wan relics (Shatin to Central Link construction site) Relics from Song-Yuan period were discovered during the construction of the new Sung Wong Toi station. With AAB's consultation, modification and relocation of the station ventilation facilities were made to allow the preservation in situ of these archaeological features.
2013–2015	Tung Tak Pawn Shop With criticisms on the reasons of grading suggested by AAB, the Grade 3 status of Tung Tak Pawn Shop still remained after the re-consideration of the decision. The demolition and reconstruction plans of a 23-story commercial building submitted by the landlord were approved by the Buildings Department. The building was finally demolished in 2015.
2017	The Red House ('Hung Lau') Hung Lau has been Grade 1 historic building since 1981. In 2017, the owner carried out some demolition works in the House without prior approval from the Buildings Department. Due to the immediate demolition threat, Hung Lau was declared as a proposed monument while it was not declared as a monument since AAB held that it did not reach the high threshold. Agreement to conduct renovation was reached between the government and the owner yet it has still not been commenced.
2009–2020	Ho Tung Gardens
2016–2020	State Theatre
2021	Ex-Sham Shui Po Service Reservoir
2021	Hong Kong Cemetery Experts urged the government to review the grading system and the Hong Kong Cemetery should have been graded as a historic building. It was pointed out that the nearby Hong Kong Cemetery Chapel was listed as Grade 1 building while the Hong Kong Cemetery, having a longer history than the chapel, was still not graded.
2000–2022	Lui Seng Chun
2022 –	Hong Kong City Hall In March 2022, AAB published a proposal to seek advice on declaring the City Hall as a monument. The City Hall will then be the first post-war monument in Hong Kong. Not only taking into account the historical value of the City Hall, the officials also rarely prioritised citizens' collective memory. The proposal was approved by AAB and the declaration progress will proceed accordingly.

== See also ==
- Antiquities and Monuments Office
- Heritage conservation in Hong Kong
- Antiquities and Monuments Ordinance
- Declared monuments of Hong Kong
- List of Grade I historical buildings in Hong Kong
- List of Grade II historical buildings in Hong Kong
- List of Grade III historical buildings in Hong Kong
