= Antiquities and Monuments Ordinance =

Legislation of Hong Kong

Legislative Council of Hong Kong
- Long title: An Ordinance to provide for the preservation of objects of historical, archaeological and palaeontological interest and for matters ancillary thereto or connected therewith.
- Citation: Cap. 53
- Passed by: Legislative Council of Hong Kong
- Passed: 1 December 1971
- Commenced: 3 December 1971

Legislative history
- Introduced by: Secretary for Home Affairs Donald Collin Cumyn Luddington
- Introduced: 29 October 1971
- First reading: 3 November 1971
- Second reading: 17 November 1971
- Third reading: 1 December 1971

Amended by
- 1974, 1981, 1982, 1983, 1985, 1986, 1989, 1993, 1995, 1996, 1997, 1998, 2000, 2002, 2007, 2012, 2019
- Status: Current legislation

Antiquities and Monuments Ordinance
- Traditional Chinese: 古物及古蹟條例
- Simplified Chinese: 古物及古迹条例
Transcriptions
Standard Mandarin
- Hanyu Pinyin: Gǔwù jí Gǔjì Tiáolì
Yue: Cantonese
- Jyutping: gu2 mat6 kap6 gu2 zik1 tiu4 lai6

The Antiquities and Monuments Ordinance, in Hong Kong Law (Cap. 53), was enacted in 1976 to preserve the objects of historical, archaeological and palaeontological interest and for matters ancillary thereto or connected therewith. It is administered by the Antiquities Authority (Secretary for Development), with the executive support of the Antiquities and Monuments Office under the Development Bureau, since 2007.

== Constitution of the Antiquities Advisory Board ==
Section 17 of the Ordinance establishes the Antiquities Advisory Board (AAB), which consists of members the Chief Executive may appoint, with one being appointed Chairman by the Chief Executive. The Ordinance does not mandate a minimum number of members, nor the qualifications to become a member.

Under s.18 of the Ordinance, the AAB gives a recommendation for the Antiquities Authority on matters relating to antiquities, proposed monuments or monuments under s.2A(1), s.3(1), and s.6(4) of the Antiquities and Monuments Ordinance (Cap. 53). Those matters include the declaration of proposed monuments, declaration of monuments, and exemptions of forbidden acts relating to certain monuments.

== Antiquities ==
Under the Ordinance, "Antiquities" are defined as "places, buildings, sites or structures erected, formed or built by human agency before the year 1800 and the ruins or remains of any such place, building, site or structure, whether or not the same has been modified, added to or restored after the year 1799" and "relics". The word, "relics" is defined as the movable objects made, shaped, painted, carved, inscribed, created, manufactured, produced or modified by human agency before the year 1800 or those have not been modified, added to or restored after the year 1799. Fossil remains or impressions are also considered as "relics" under the Ordinance.

=== Archaeological sites ===
All archaeological relics in Hong Kong are considered as properties of the Government under the Ordinance. This includes ancient architecture, kilns, hearths, rock carvings, farm lands, shell or refuse mounds and foot prints of ancient human beings.

The Antiquities Authority is empowered to regulate the search and excavation of all such relics through a system of licensing.

The most important sites are declared as Declared Monuments. These are defined under the Ordinance as any feature, structure, building and artefact which are considered important because of its historical, archaeological or palaeontological significance.

Over 180 sites are known as Sites of Specific Archaeological Interest (SSAI).

== Monuments ==
After consultation with the AAB and with the approval of the Chief Executive, the Secretary for Development may, by notice in the Gazette, declare any place, building, site or structure, which he or she considers to be of public interest by reason of its historical, archaeological or palaeontological significance, to be a monument.

According to the Ordinance, any one without permits granted by the Secretary for Home Affairs, is not allowed to excavate, carry on building or other works, plant or fell trees or deposit earth or refuse on or in any proposed monuments or monuments; or demolish, remove, obstruct, deface or interfere with any proposed monuments or monuments.

=== Proposed monuments ===
Several historical building have been declared as proposed monuments for temporary statutory protection within a specified period.

King Yin Lei, now being declared monument, was declared a "proposed monument" on 15 September 2007, due to the damage caused by the non-structural works. Jessville, now a Grade III historical building, was declared a "proposed monument" on 20 April 2007.

== See also ==
- Antiquities Advisory Board
- Declared monuments of Hong Kong
- Heritage conservation in Hong Kong
