= Antiquities and Monuments Office =

Hong Kong government organization

Statutory authority overview
- Formed: 1976; 50 years ago Antiquities and Monuments Ordinance
- Headquarters: 136 Nathan Road; Tsim Sha Tsui, Kowloon
- Statutory authority executive: Susanna Siu, Executive Secretary
- Parent department: The Commissioner for Heritage's Office
- Parent statutory authority: Antiquities Authority (Secretary for Development)
- Website: www.amo.gov.hk/en/home/index.html

Chinese name
- Traditional Chinese: 古物古蹟辦事處
- Simplified Chinese: 古物古迹办事处
Transcriptions
Standard Mandarin
- Hanyu Pinyin: Gǔwù Gǔjī Bànshì Chù
Yue: Cantonese
- Yale Romanization: Gú maht gú jīk baahn sih chyu
- Jyutping: Gu^{2} mat^{6} gu^{2} zik^{1} baan^{6} si^{6} cyu^{3}

The Antiquities and Monuments Office (AMO) is a Hong Kong government organization established in 1976 under the Antiquities and Monuments Ordinance to protect and preserve historic monuments. Housed in the Former Kowloon British School, the AMO is responsible for identifying, recording and researching buildings and items of historical interest, as well as organising and coordinating surveys and excavations in areas of archaeological significance. The Commissioner for Heritage's Office under the Development Bureau of the Hong Kong government currently manages the Office.

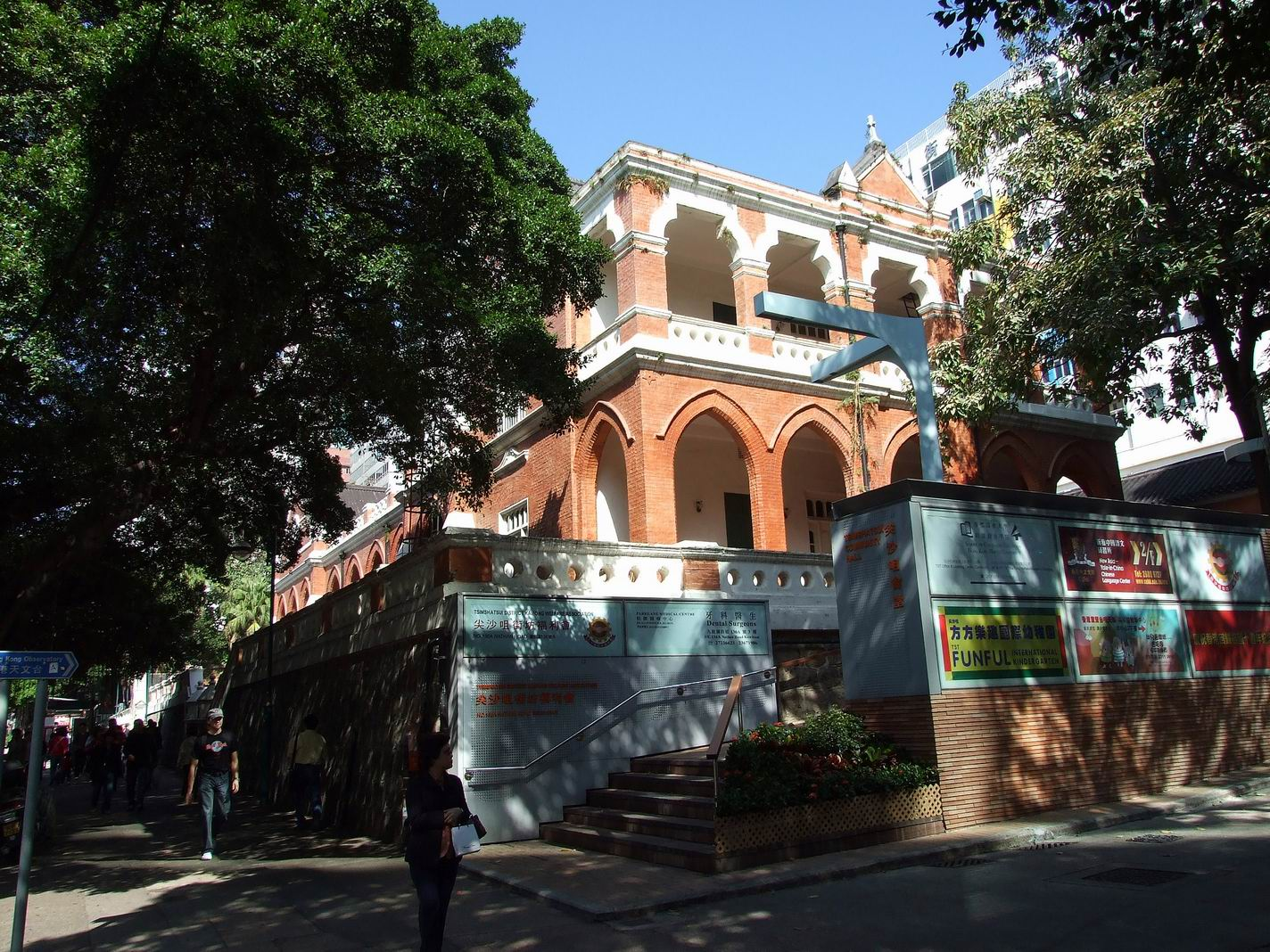
Former Kowloon British School, now housing the Antiquities and Monuments Office.

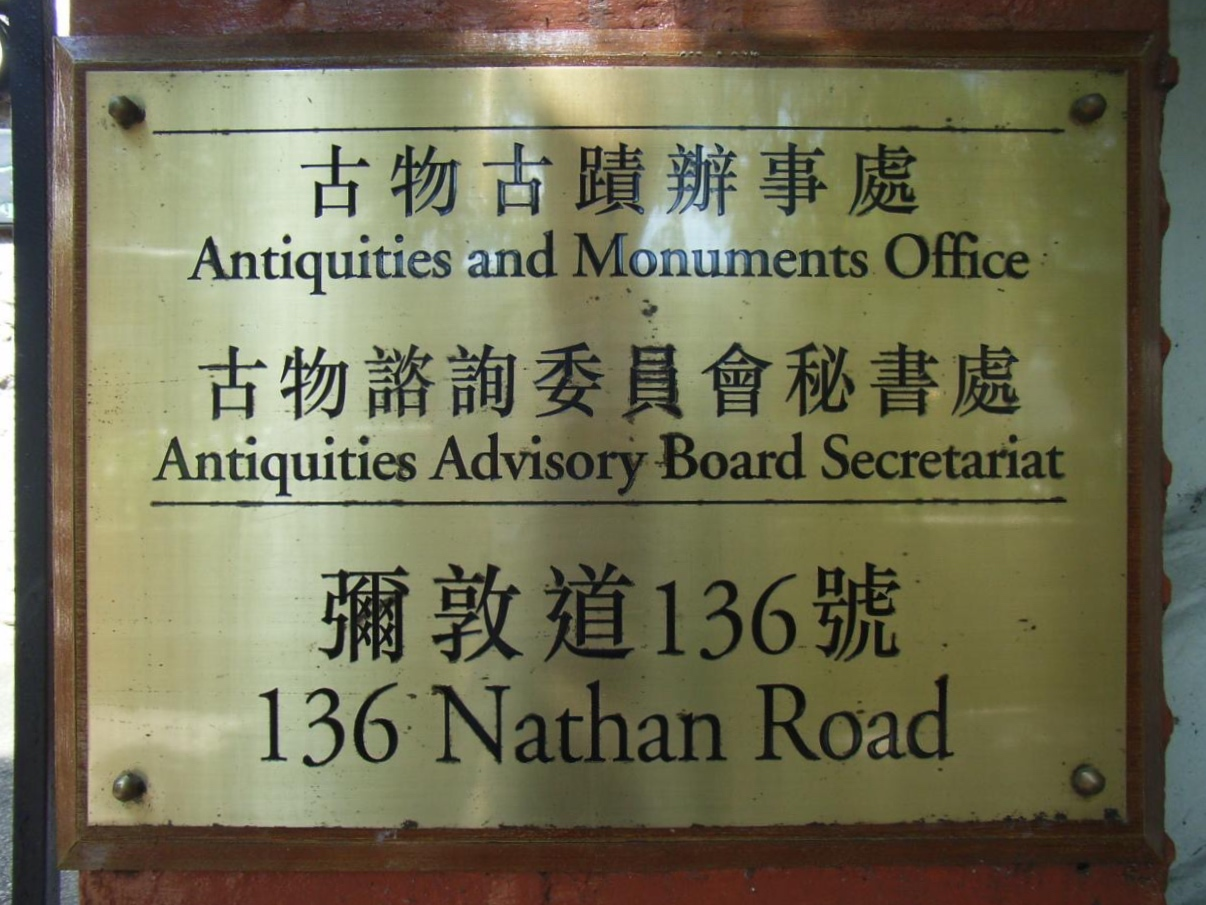
Plaque

== Relationship with other government agencies ==
The AMO is the executive arm of the Antiquities Authority, a portfolio of the Secretary for Development. The AMO also offers secretarial and executive assistance to the Antiquities Advisory Board (AAB) and executes the advice made by the AAB, including the execution of the Chief Executive's decision to declare monuments.

The Government's problematic and confusing framework was exposed by the battle to preserve Queen's Pier. The director of Hong Kong University's architectural conservation program, said that the government needed to clarify relations and responsibilities between the board, the office and the Antiquities Authority.

The AMO was formerly subordinate to the Leisure and Cultural Services Department (LCSD). To achieve synergy in implementing policy directives on heritage conservation and streamline day-to-day operations, since 1 April 2019 it has been placed under the Commissioner for Heritage's Office of the Development Bureau instead.

== Responsibilities ==
One of the duties of the Office is to foster public awareness of Hong Kong's heritage through education, publicity programmes and the setting up of heritage trails and exhibition centres. The Hong Kong Heritage Discovery Centre and the Ping Shan Tang Clan Gallery cum Heritage Trail Visitors Centre are under the management of the Office.

The adaptive reuse of some historic buildings is organized by the Office, which also provides subvention to the Hong Kong Archaeological Society for excavations and surveys of unexplored heritages.

== See also ==
- Antiquities Advisory Board
- Heritage conservation in Hong Kong
