= Kowloon British School =

Former school in Hong Kong

Coordinates: 22.3016°N 114.172°E

- Traditional Chinese: 前九龍英童學校
- Simplified Chinese: 前九龙英童学校
- Literal meaning: Initial Kowloon School for British Children
Transcriptions
Standard Mandarin
- Hanyu Pinyin: Qián Jiǔlóng Yīng Tóng Xuéxiào
Yue: Cantonese
- Yale Romanization: Chìhn gáu lùhng yīng tùhng hohk gaau
- Jyutping: Cin4 gau2 lung4 jing1 tung4 hok6 gaau3

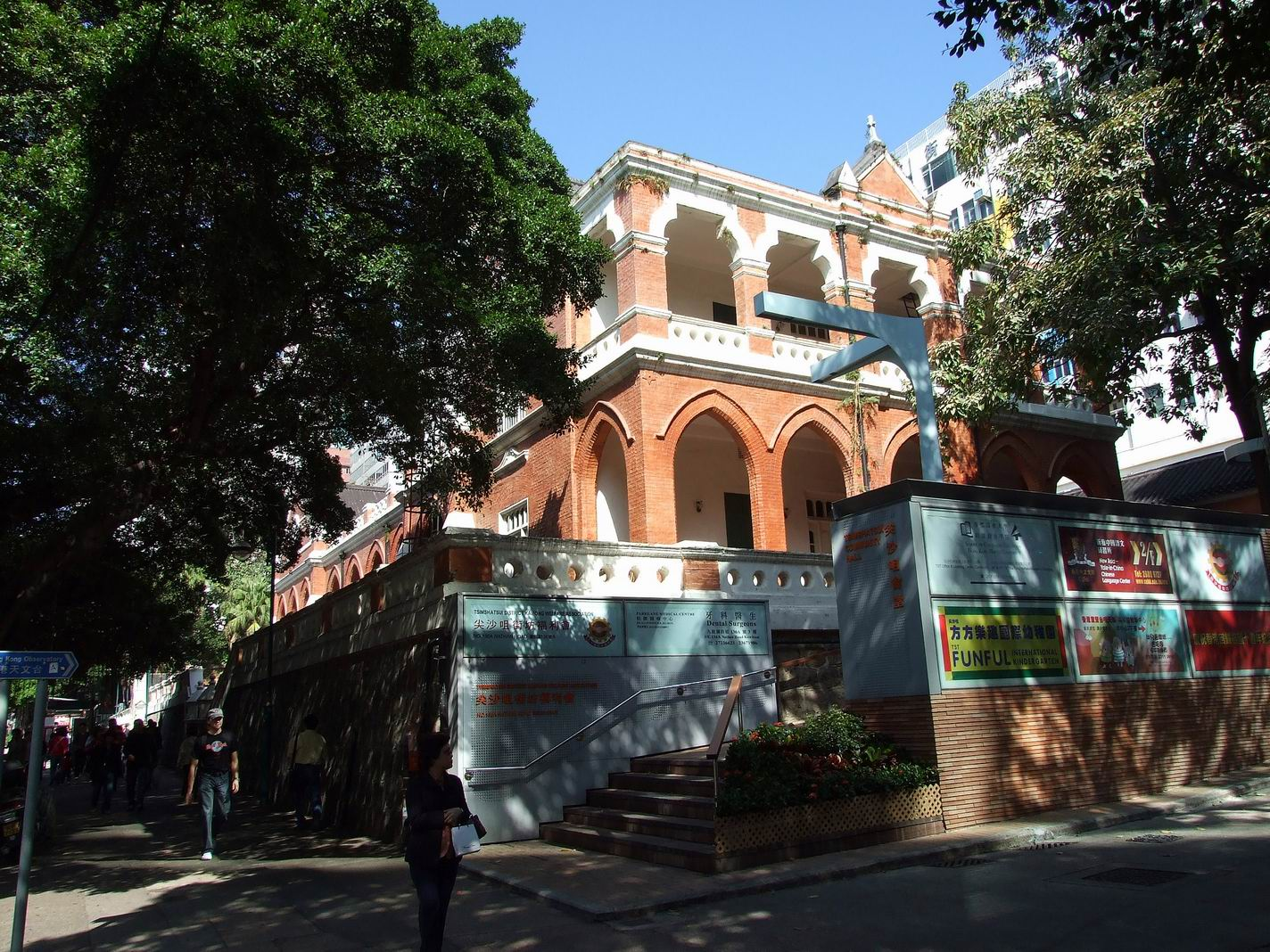
Former Kowloon British School. View from Nathan Road

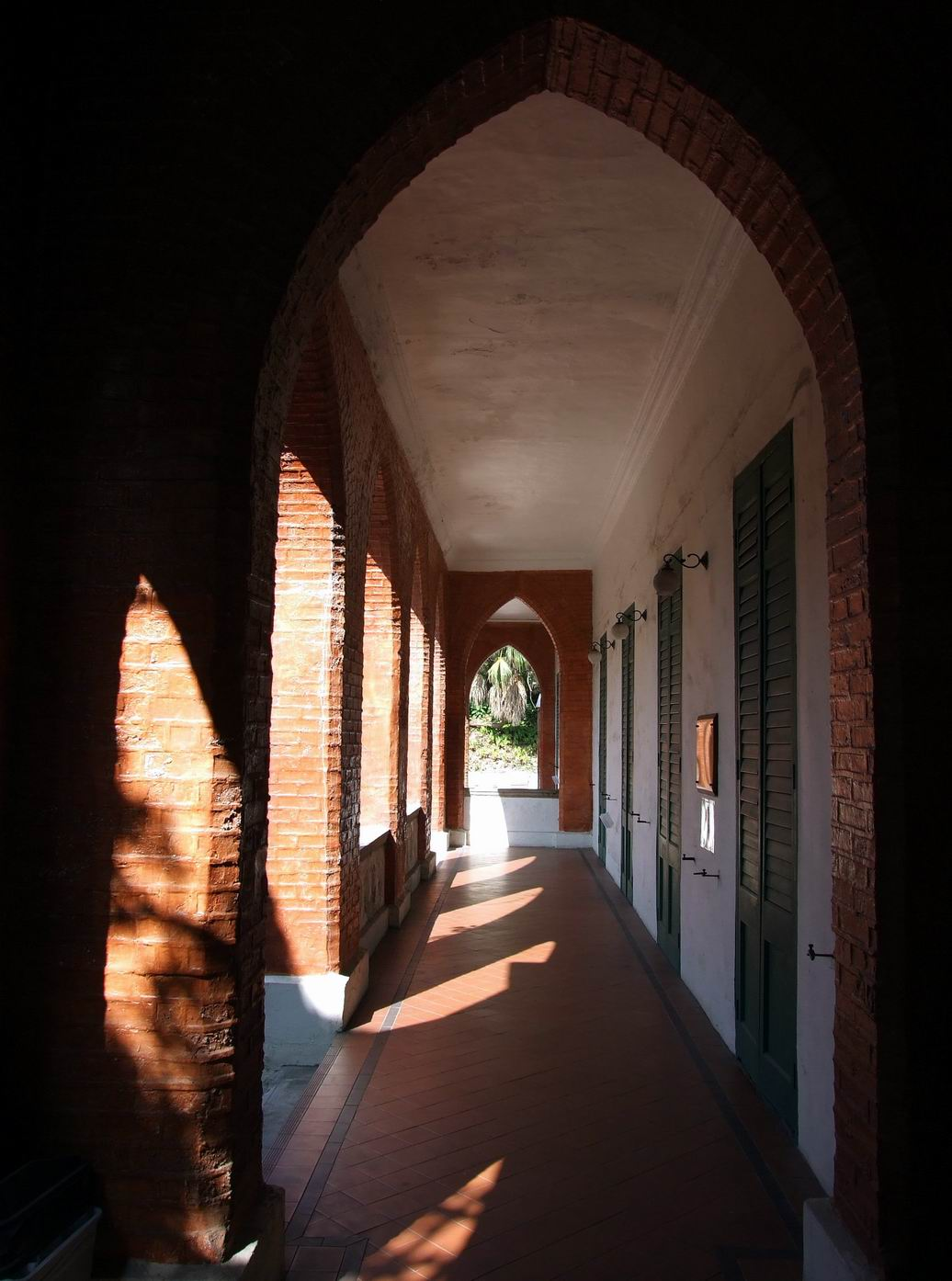
Front verandas

The Kowloon British School was a school established in Hong Kong for the education of the children of expatriates at the turn of the 20th century.

== History ==
The school was built at 136 Nathan Road, Tsim Sha Tsui, Kowloon, and is the oldest surviving school building constructed for the expatriate community in Hong Kong. In 1900, Mr. Ho Tung (later Sir Robert) donated $15,000 to the Government to set up a school in Kowloon. The building was officially opened by Governor Blake on 19 April 1902.

The school was officially opened as a primary school for some 60 pupils, but it was converted to a secondary school for some 300 students in the mid-1930s. The school remained at this building until 1937, when it relocated to 2 Tin Kwong Road in Ho Man Tin. The school was closed in August 1940 after children were ordered out of Hong Kong as World War II began to impact Hong Kong. The school reopened in the summer of 1946 and was renamed King George V School in 1948.

The building is a typical Victorian structure but was modified to adapt to the local climate by adding wide verandas, high ceilings and pitched roofs.

The Family Welfare Association and Tsim Sha Tsui Kaifong Association used the building after the Second World War. Having been restored, it now houses the Antiquities and Monuments Office.

It became a declared monument of Hong Kong on 19 July 1991.

== See also ==
- King George V School: the former Kowloon British School is forerunner of this school.
