= Star Ferry Pier =

Star Ferry Pier (Chinese: 天星碼頭) may refer to the following piers in Hong Kong:

- Star Ferry Pier, Central, a ferry pier in Central, Hong Kong Island
- Star Ferry Pier, Tsim Sha Tsui, a ferry pier in Tsim Sha Tsui, Kowloon
