= Star Ferry Pier, Central =

Ferry pier in Central, Hong Kong

Coordinates: 22°17′14″N 114°9′40″E

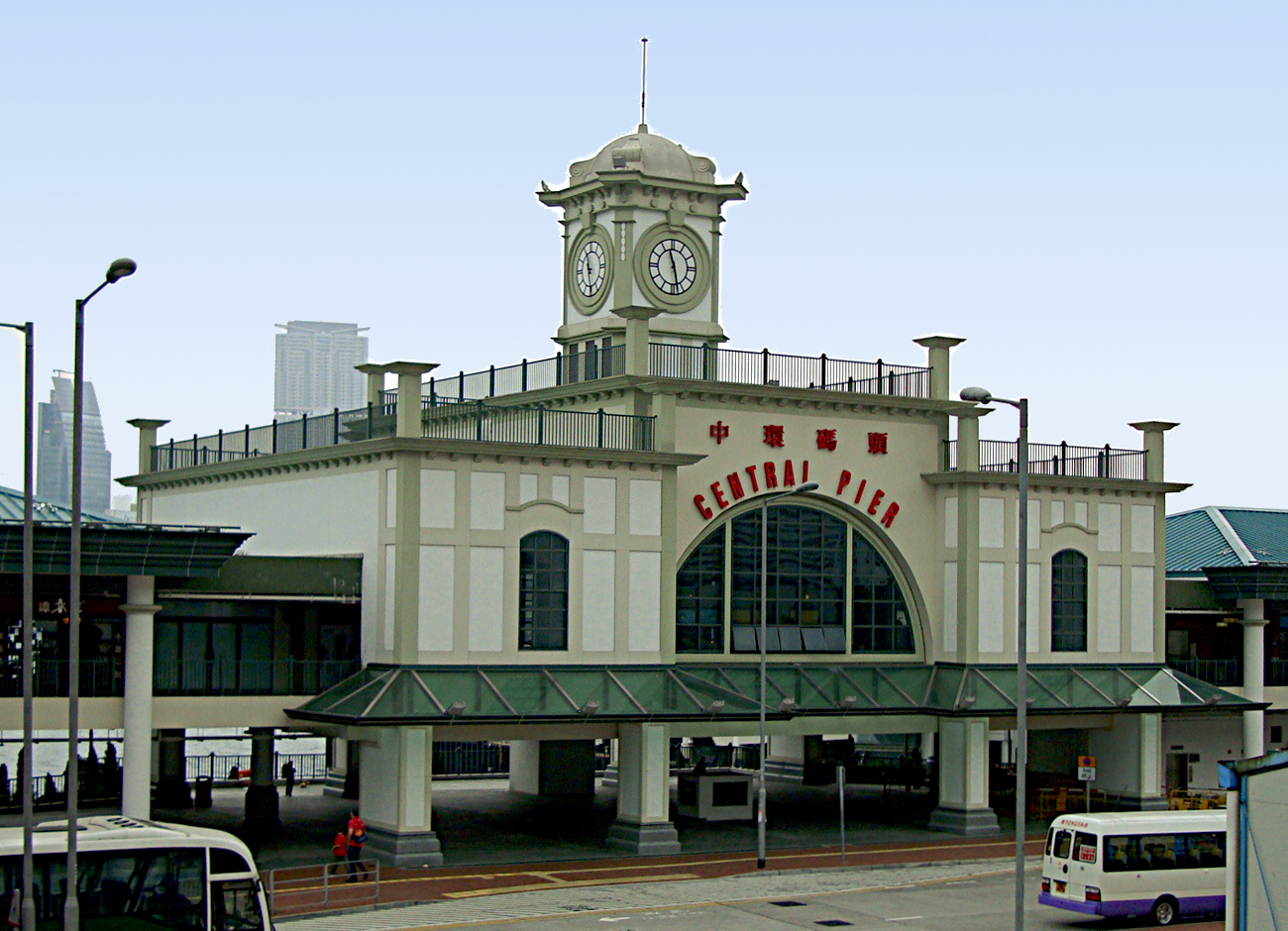
- Southern façade of Star Ferry Pier in 2012.
- Traditional Chinese: 中環天星碼頭
Transcriptions
Standard Mandarin
- Hanyu Pinyin: Zhōnghuán Tiānxīng Mǎtóu
Hakka
- Romanization: Zung^{1}van^{2} Tien^{1}sin^{1} Ma^{1}tiu^{2}
Yue: Cantonese
- Jyutping: Zung^{1}waan^{4} Tin^{1}sing^{1} Ma^{5}tau^{4}

Star Ferry Pier, Central (Chinese: 中環天星碼頭) may refer to any of the successive generations of Central Ferry Piers in Central, Hong Kong used by the Star Ferry for its services across Victoria Harbour to Tsim Sha Tsui Ferry Pier and until April 2011, to Hung Hom Pier. The current Star Ferry pier is the fourth to bear the name in Central. It opened for public service on 12 November 2006.

== Location ==
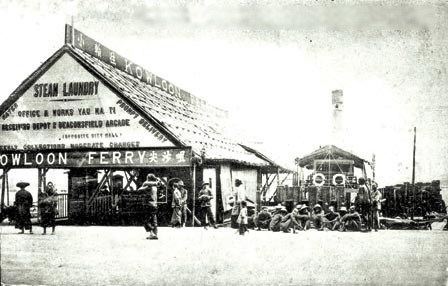
First generation pier.

=== First generation ===
First Generation (1890) was located at the junction of Pedder Street and Chater Road. The first ferry pier was a simple wooden shelter with a roof.

A temporary pier off Ice House Street, located across from Queen's Building was then leased to the Star Ferry Co. from 1900. It was replaced in 1912 by the Second Generation pier, at the same location.

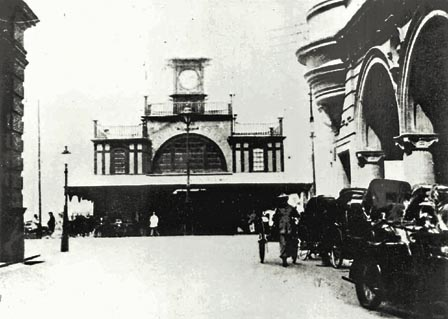
The second generation pier at the end of Ice House Street, 1912. Queen's Building is on the right.

=== Second generation ===
Second Generation (1910) was located opposite to the end of Ice House Street, at the present site of Jardine House.

=== Third generation ===
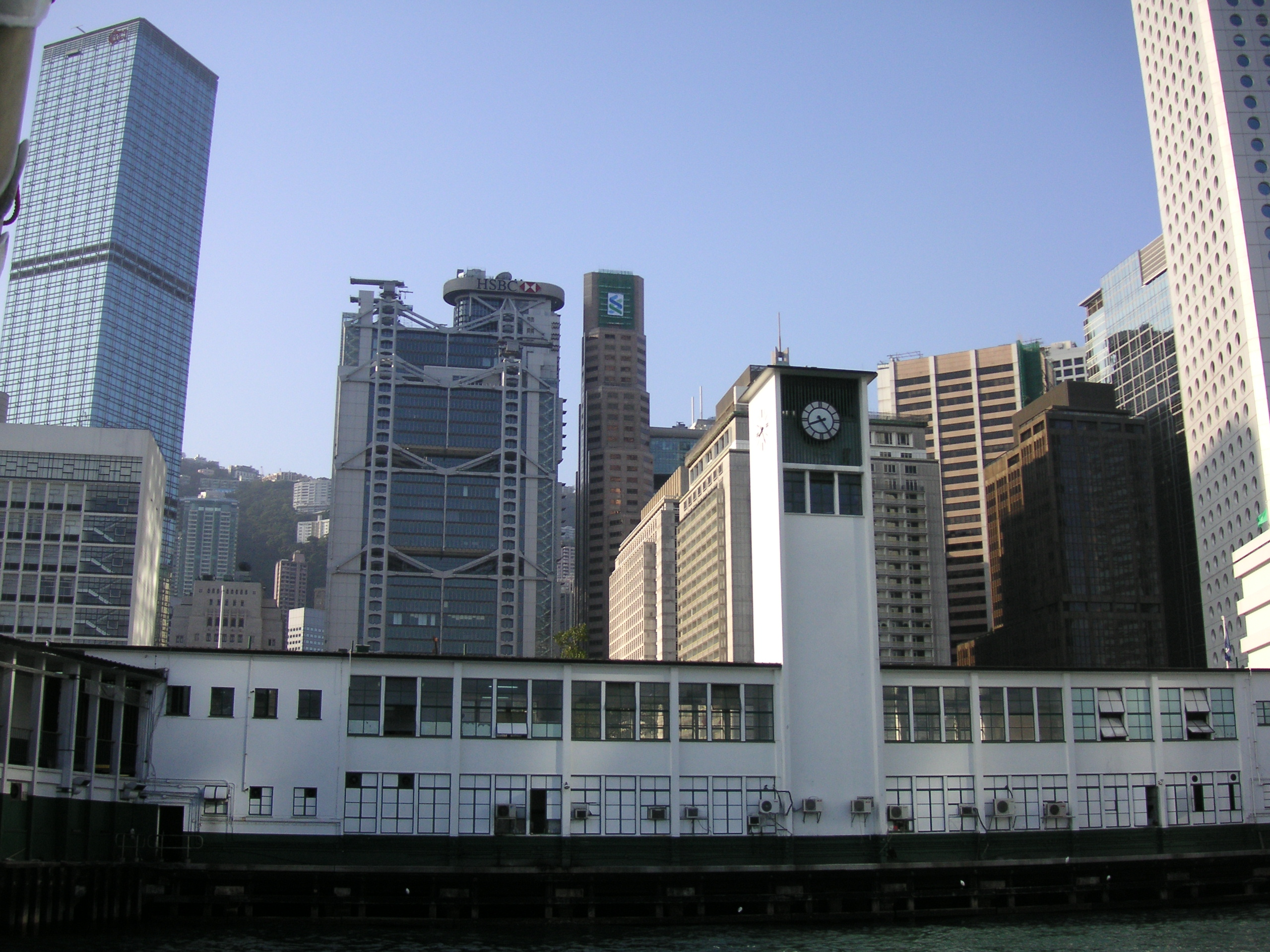
The 3rd generation Pier at Edinburgh Place in December 2005.

Third Generation (1957) near Edinburgh Place, decommissioned 11 November 2006.

The pier was created in the late 1950s following a major land reclamation in Central. The pier was built in 1957 in the Streamline Moderne style at the height of the Modern Movement near the City Hall complex, which was being planned at the time. Its completion was concurrent with the completion of the still standing Tsim Sha Tsui Ferry Pier, which was built on the Kowloon side.

The Star Ferry Pier was designed by a local Chinese architect, Hung Yip Chan (born in 1921). He worked at the Architectural Office (AO) of the Hong Kong Government from 1952 to 1957 as an assistant architect. He designed the facade of the pier, and the Chief Architect Michael Wright added the Clock Tower to make the pier more balanced and practical.

=== Fourth generation ===
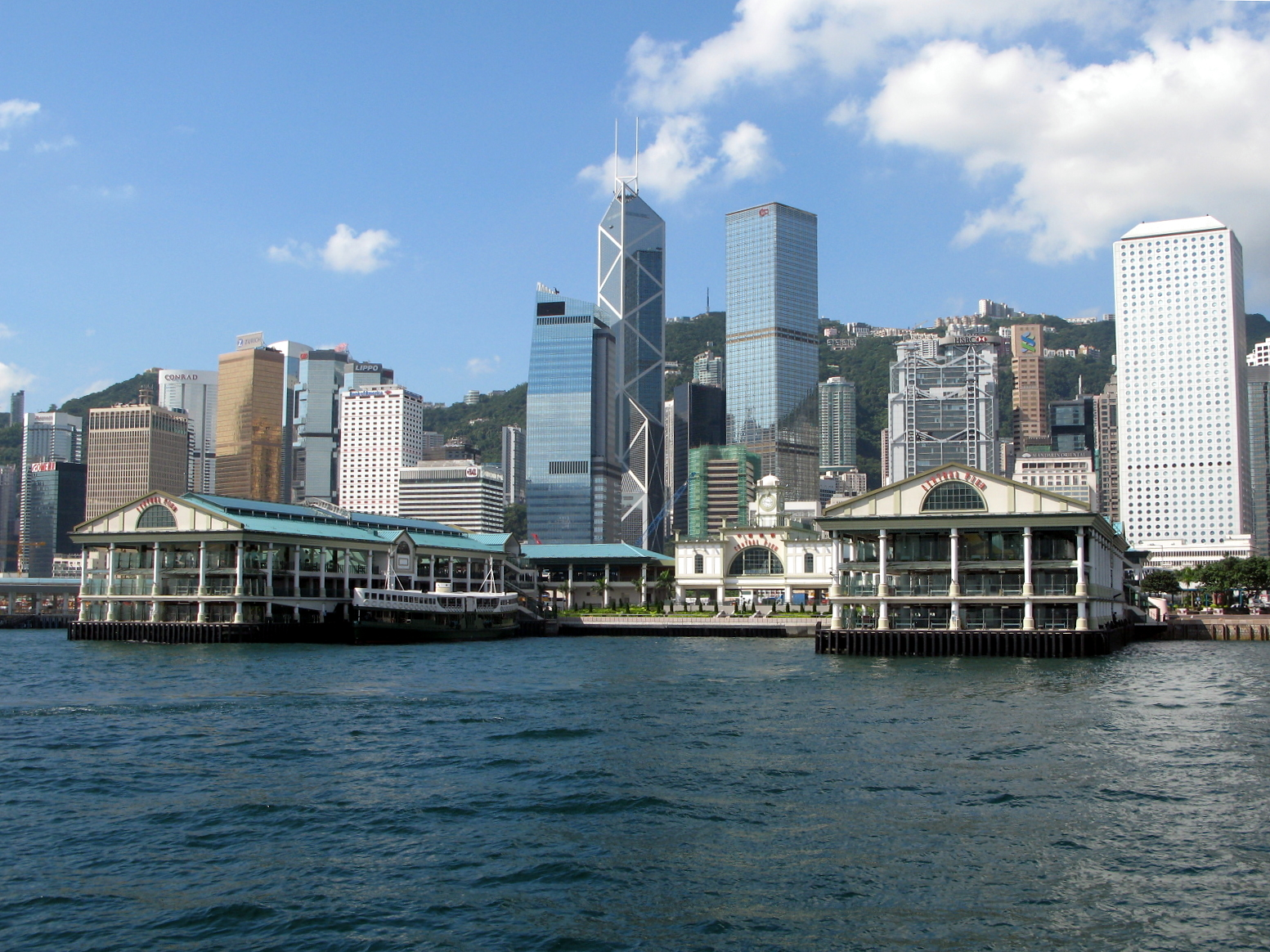
4th generation Star Ferry Pier in June 2009, with Pier 8 on the left and Pier 7 on the right. Pier 8 was converted into a museum in 2013.

Fourth Generation (2006) – also known as "Central Ferry Piers 7 and 8" at Man Kwong Street.

Central Piers 7 and 8 were built to replace the Edinburgh Place Ferry Pier in Central, on Hong Kong Island, pursuant of the Central and Wan Chai Reclamation projects. The building design resembles the second generation pier.

The pier was moved further into Victoria Harbour, and constructed on reclaimed land approximately 300 metres away from the former site (as the crow flies). The new pier is located directly northwards, in front of the old pier.

Part of the new pier was built at the time of the reclamation for the Hong Kong station of the Airport Express MTR line and the International Finance Centre. It thus derives its name from having been Pier No.7 of the outlying islands ferry piers.

Pier 8 was subsequently converted and is currently housing the Hong Kong Maritime Museum since February 2013. As a consequence, Pier 7 remains the only one serving the Star Ferry in Central.

== Design ==
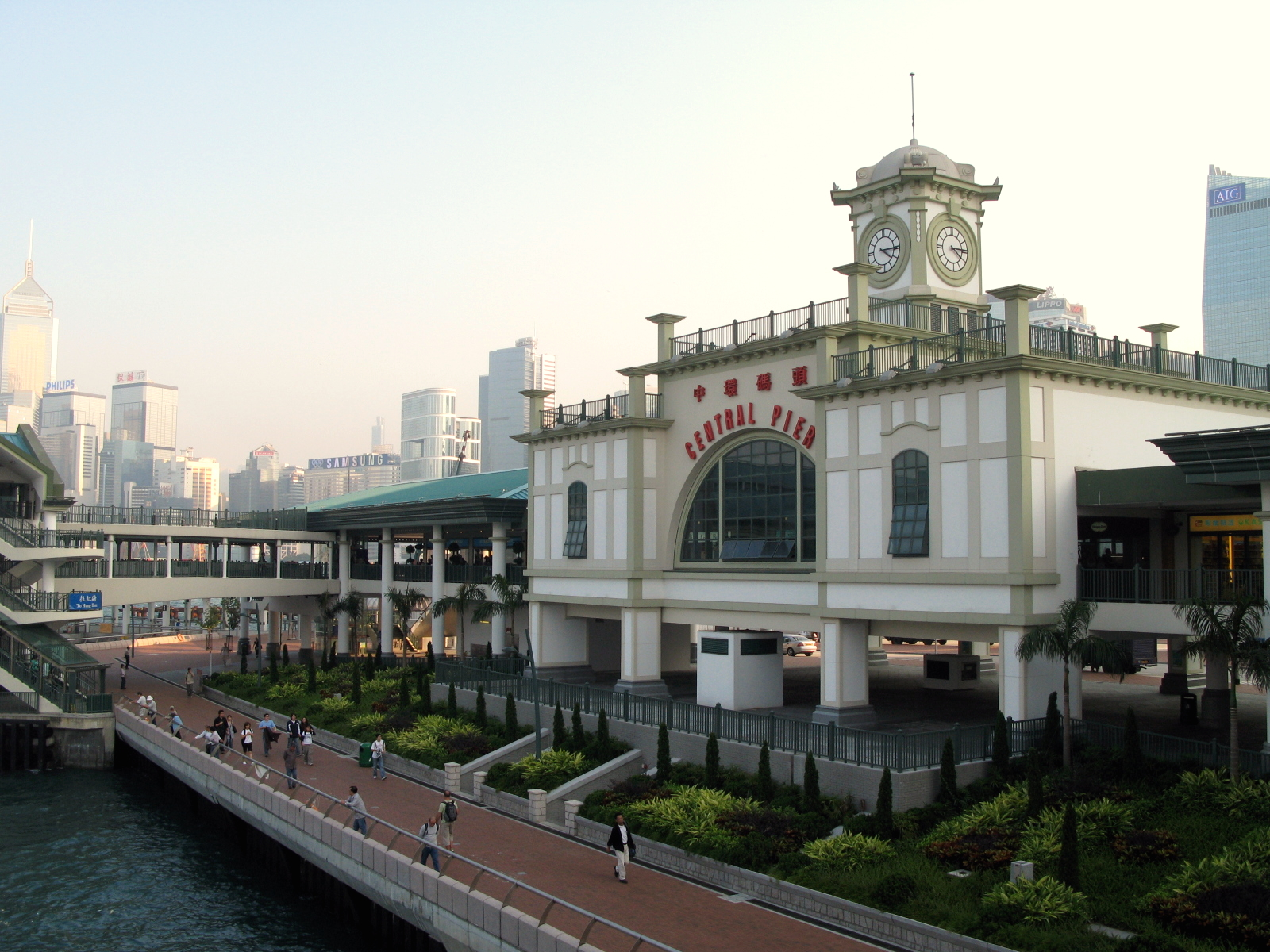
The northern façade of the fourth-generation Star Ferry Pier (harbour side) in November 2007.

As these structures occupy a prime waterfront site, the Government had attempted to develop the piers into a new landmark for public enjoyment. The Star Ferry proposed a historical heritage design approach and this pier was expanded eastwards to resemble a replica of the second generation Edwardian pier.

The present mock-Edwardian pier, being a 600-square-metre terminal, features a clock tower with a new set of five electronically controlled bells that sound similar to those of the former Edinburgh Place Ferry Pier. Other design features of the building include open-air pier, natural lighting, including skylights.

The bottom two floors of each of the two "finger piers" will serve as boarding and waiting rooms, while the top floors will feature a public viewing deck, a canteen-style restaurant and a café. The Star Ferry Company has also applied to set up a bar in one area of the top floor.

To get to the public viewing corridor, visitors should pass through the passage to the Waterfront restaurant and turn right.

=== Design controversy ===
The Government's attempt at Edwardian architecture drew some criticism from the public in both the design and materials used, and the structure has been criticised as "an imitation of the past without capturing the spirit of the past or present". It has been derided amongst others as "theme park" in appearance.

== See also ==
- Wan Chai Pier
- Tourism in Hong Kong
