= Edinburgh Place =

Square in Hong Kong

Coordinates: 22.28288°N 114.16083°E

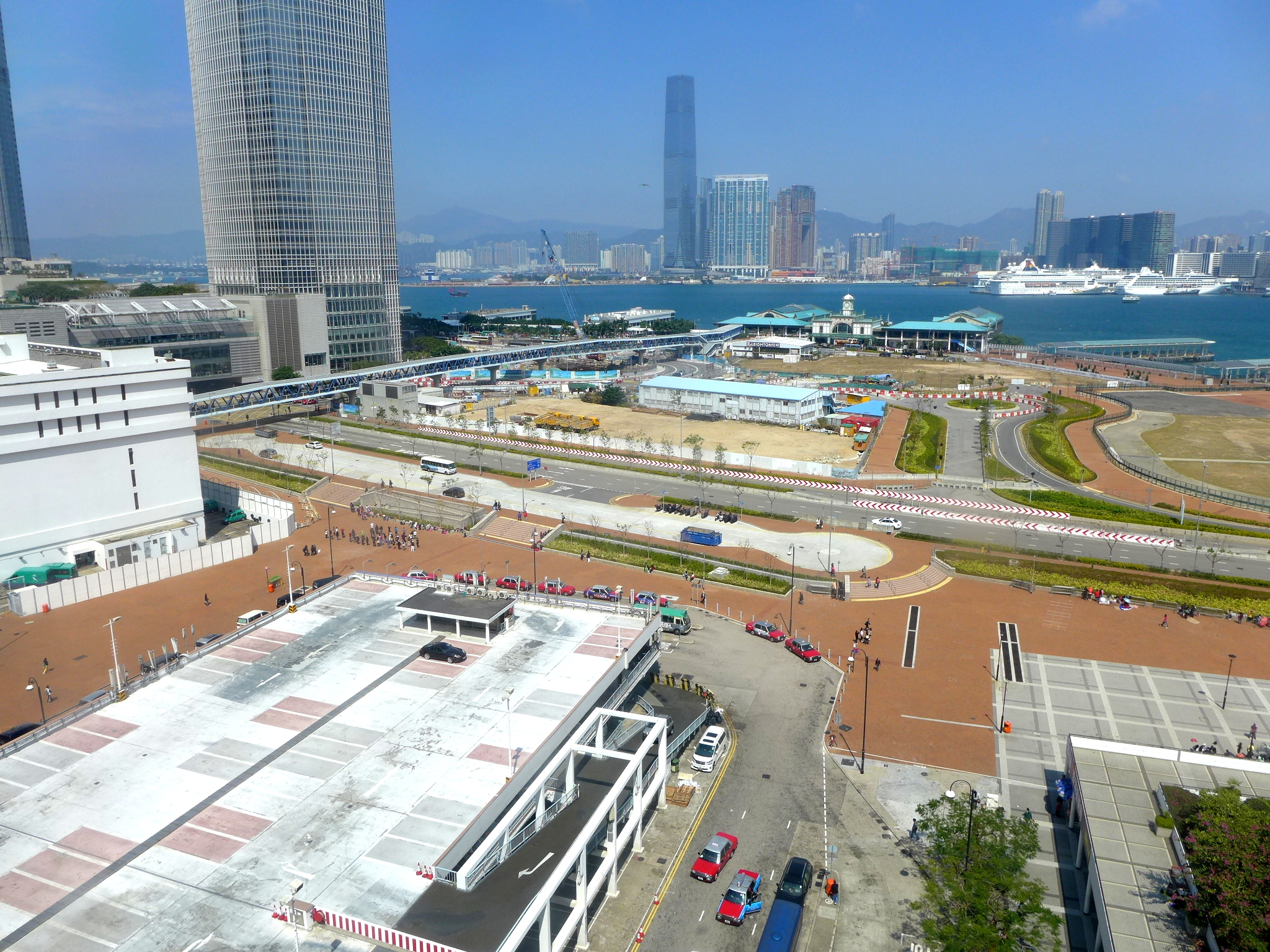
- Edinburgh Place as viewed from the City Hall in February 2014
- Traditional Chinese: 愛丁堡廣場
- Simplified Chinese: 爱丁堡广场
Transcriptions
Standard Mandarin
- Hanyu Pinyin: Àidīngbǎo Guǎngchǎng
Yue: Cantonese
- Yale Romanization: (ng)oi^{3} ding^{1} bou^{2} gwong^{2} cheung^{4}
- Jyutping: =(ng)oi^{3} ding^{1} bou^{2} gwong^{2} coeng^{4}

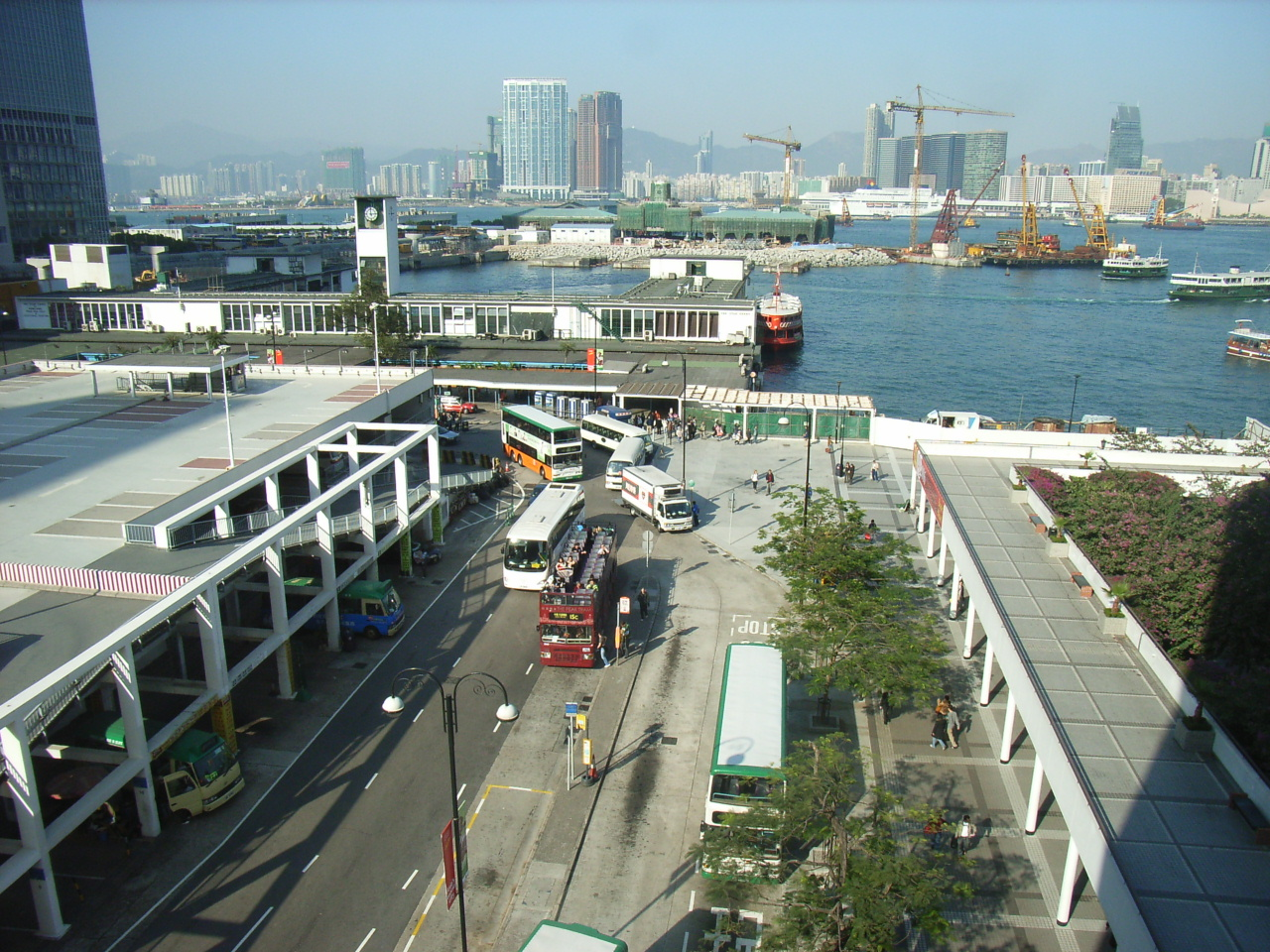
Edinburgh Place in December 2005. The old Star Ferry Pier is in the foreground, with the under-construction fourth-generation pier visible in the distance.

Edinburgh Place is a public square in Central, Hong Kong, adjacent to the Victoria Harbour. The Hong Kong City Hall is located in the square. In addition, the Edinburgh Place Ferry Pier and Queen's Pier were also located in the square before they were demolished in early 2007.

== History ==
The Edinburgh Place complex, which included the City Hall and the Memorial gardens were designed by British architects Ron Phillips and Alan Fitch in 1956 for the most important civic functions of the city.

The Star Ferry Pier was designed by a local architect Hung Yip Chan (born 1921). He worked in the Architectural Office (AO) of the former Public Works Department from 1952 to 1957 as an assistant architect. He designed the facade of the pier, and the Chief Architect, Michael Wright, added the Clock Tower to make the pier more balanced.

Queen's Pier, completed in 1954, was "an integral part" of the cluster: the entrance to the City Hall formed an axis with the Pier to lend a sense of occasion to visiting dignitaries. From the completion of City Hall in 1962, each arriving new Governor would land at Queen's Pier, and they would hold an inspection of the Guard of honour in Edinburgh Place before being sworn in nearby in the City Hall. The Star Ferry Pier was completed in 1957.

Edinburgh Place was deliberately kept as open space in the overbuilt city, freely accessible to the public, as this was considered an essential contrast to the city bustle.

Its openness meant that the square would occasionally be used as a rallying point for small marches and protests within earshot of legislators. For example, in July 1978, 2000 people rallied to demand the re-opening of the defunct Precious Blood Golden Jubilee School. Since October 1987, the Legislative Council has banned gatherings outside the principal LegCo building.

== See also ==
- Central and Western Heritage Trail
