= Man Kok Tsui =

Cape and village of Hong Kong

Coordinates: 22.266885°N 114.020861°E

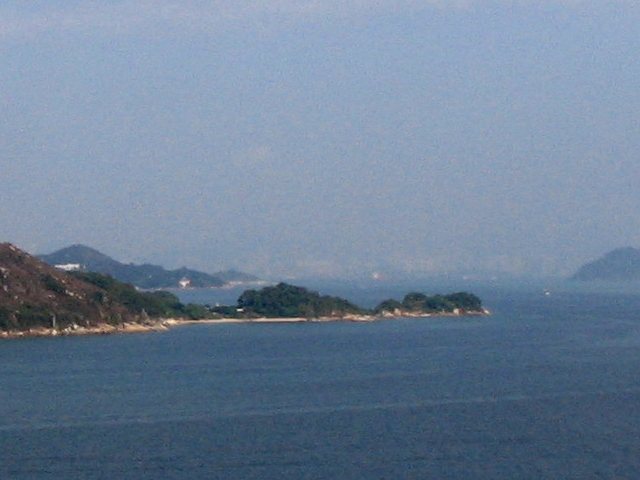
Man Kok Tsui cape.

Man Kok Tsui (Chinese: 萬角咀) is the name of a cape and a nearby village of Lantau Island, Hong Kong.

== Administration ==
Man Kok Tsui is a recognized village under the New Territories Small House Policy.

== Geography ==
Man Kok Tsui is located south of Kau Shat Wan.
