= Kau Shat Wan =

Coordinates: 22.2756°N 114.0030°E

- Traditional Chinese: 狗虱灣
Transcriptions
Yue: Cantonese
- Yale Romanization: Gáu sāt wāan
- Jyutping: Gau^{2} sat^{1} waan^{1}

Kau Shat Wan (Chinese: 狗虱灣, literally dog flea bay) was a bay located between Discovery Bay and Mui Wo on Lantau Island, New Territories, Hong Kong. In the 1990s, the Hong Kong Government decided to reclaim the bay to construct a Government explosives depot and replace the one on Stonecutters Island. The depot started operation in 1997.

An automatic irrigation system run by solar power was tried out on a vegetated slope at Kau Shat Wan. The dismantled components of Queen's Pier are now also stored in there.

== See also ==
- Man Kok Tsui
