= Edinburgh Place Ferry Pier =

Pier in Edinburgh Place, Central, Hong Kong

Coordinates: 22°17′1″N 114°9′37.5″E

- Traditional Chinese: 愛丁堡廣場渡輪碼頭
- Simplified Chinese: 爱丁堡广场渡轮码头
- Cantonese Yale: Oidīngbóu gwóngchèuhng douhlèuhn máhtàuh
Transcriptions
Standard Mandarin
- Hanyu Pinyin: Àidīngbǎo guǎngchǎng dùlún mǎtóu
- Wade–Giles: Ai^{4}-ting^{1}-pao^{3} kuang^{3}-ch‘ang^{3} tu^{4}-lun^{2} ma^{3}-t‘ou^{2}
- IPA: [âɪ.tíŋ.pàʊ kwàŋ.ʈʂʰàŋ tû.lwə̌n mà.tʰǒʊ]
Yue: Cantonese
- Yale Romanization: Oidīngbóu gwóngchèuhng douhlèuhn máhtàuh
- Jyutping: oi^{3} ding^{1} bou^{2} gwong^{2} coeng^{4} dou^{6} leon^{4} maa^{5} tau^{4}
- IPA: [ɔj˧.tɪŋ˥.pɔw˧˥ kʷɔŋ˧˥.tsʰœŋ˩ tɔw˨.lɵn˩ ma˧˥.tʰɐw˩]

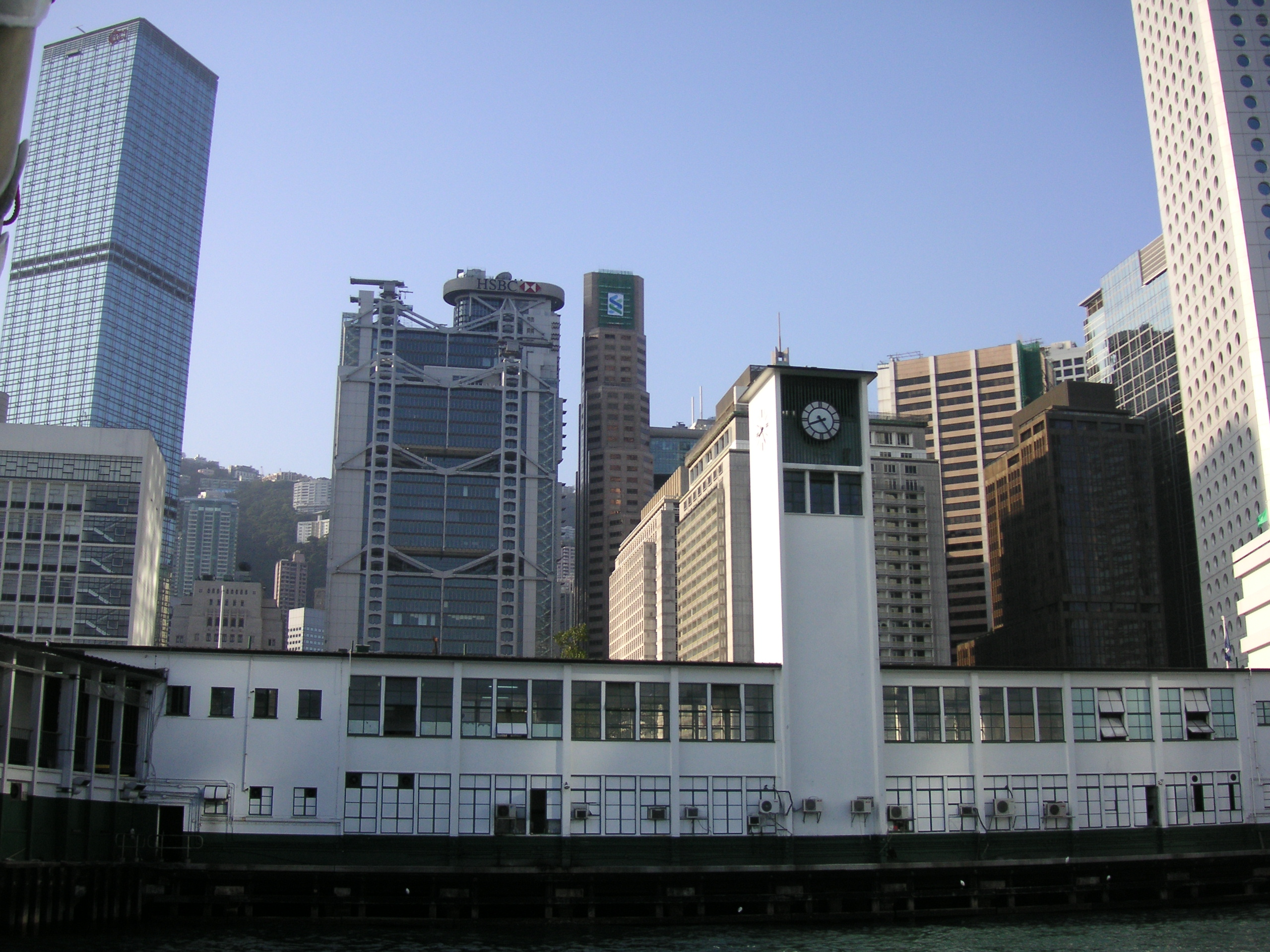
The former Star Ferry pier and its clock tower viewed from the sea, November 2005

Edinburgh Place Ferry Pier, often referred to as the "Star Ferry" Pier, was a pier in Edinburgh Place, Central, Hong Kong, serving the Star Ferry. The pier, with its clock tower, was a prominent waterfront landmark. Built in 1957 at the height of the Modern Movement, it was the third generation of the Star Ferry Pier in Central, and was located near the City Hall and the General Post Office.

The pier was the central flashpoint of the Hong Kong riots in 1966, and 40 years later became the focus of a confrontation between conservationists and the government, which wanted to demolish the pier to allow for reclamation. The ferry service from the pier was suspended on 11 November 2006, and moved to piers 7 and 8 of Central Piers. Demolition commenced on 12 December 2006, and was completed in early 2007.

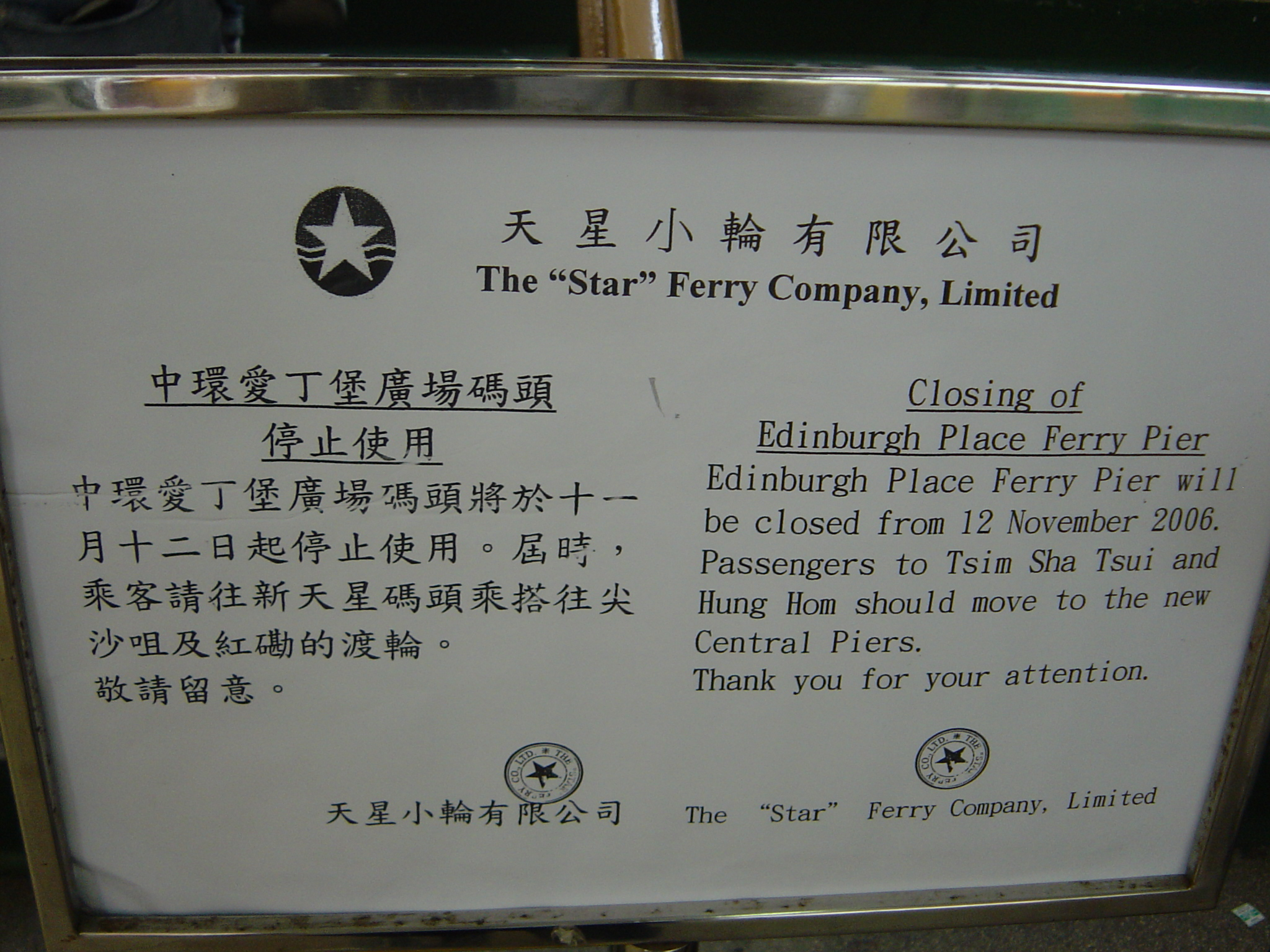
Closure notice (November 2006).

== History ==
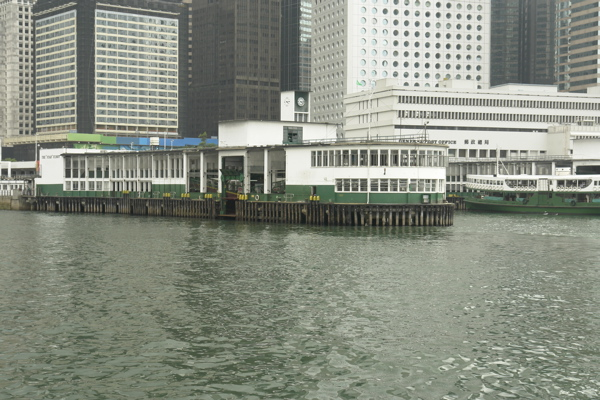
"Star Ferry" Pier (June 2006).

The entire waterfront where the "third generation" pier was situated was created in the late 1950s following a major land reclamation. The shoreline was shifted from its position at the time, level to the Mandarin Hotel. The pier was built in 1957 in Edinburgh Place, at the height of the Modern Movement, near the City Hall complex which was being planned at the time.

The Star Ferry Pier was designed by a local Chinese architect, Hung Yip Chan (born in 1921). He worked in the Architectural Office (AO) of the Hong Kong Government from 1952 to 1957 as an assistant architect. He designed the façade of the pier, and the Chief Architect, Michael Wright, added the Clock Tower to make the pier more balanced and practical.

The chimes of the turret clock installed at the pier marked every quarter-hour since the pier's inauguration in 1957. The clock was a gift from John Keswick, who had in turn received it from the Prince of Belgium. The mechanism was manufactured by British company Edward John Dent, which also provided the mechanical signature to "Big Ben" of London.

There is a major bus terminus on the Kowloon side, which is conveniently situated close to the Tsim Sha Tsui Ferry Pier. Thousands of residents passed through this principal gateway to Hong Kong Island from the Kowloon Peninsula daily from 1957 until 2006. However, the inauguration of the Cross-Harbour Tunnel in 1972 popularised vehicular travel across the harbour and reduced the flow of passengers. From 1972 to 2006, the ferry was still used by many as the shortest route from Tsim Sha Tsui (TST) to Central District, and a daily average of 74,000 passenger trips were made across the harbour in 2004.

On the island side, various New World First Bus and Citybus bus routes as well as public light buses connected to many destinations on Hong Kong Island.

=== Relocation ===
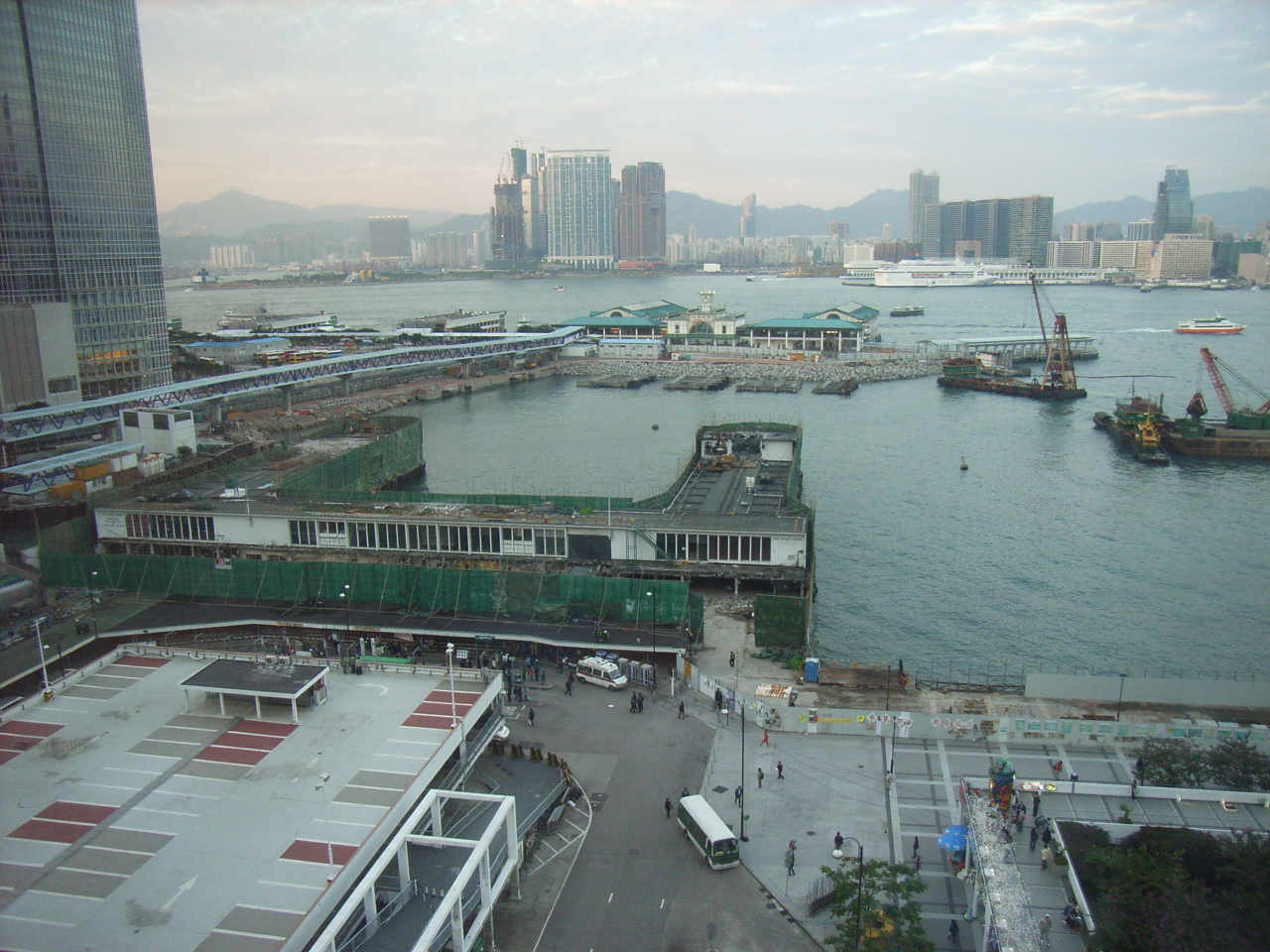
The Edinburgh Place Ferry Pier under demolition (December 2006).

The plan to relocate the Central Ferry Piers dates back to July 1999, when proposed amendments to the draft Central District (Extension) Outline Zoning Plan covering the Central Reclamation III area were published. Both the third generation Star Ferry Pier and Queen's Pier would be demolished and 16 hectares of land directly in front of the fourth-generation pier reclaimed to make way for a six-lane road and a low-rise shopping centre. The cost was estimated at HK$3.5 billion. The Government said that the historical significance of the third-generation pier would be recognised and promised to recreate the landmark on the new waterfront.

In 2001, an impact assessment for the Central Reclamation recommended the relocation of the Star Ferry Pier, and this was approved by the Antiquities Advisory Board in 2002.

=== Demolition ===
3D Laser Scanning Technology in digital recording of structures was applied to capture three-dimensional images of the pier before the demolition.

Following the pier's decommissioning on 12 November 2006, demolition work started amidst protests. The demolition was originally scheduled for the early part of 2007, but demolition was brought forward by 3 months, to 12 December 2006. The government ignored a nonbinding motion in September in the Legislative Council of Hong Kong urging it to retain the pier and clock tower.

The demolition crew took control of the site by erecting scaffolding on 6 December 2006, and demolition commenced on 12 December. Workers took down the clock mechanism and clock face, leaving a gaping hole, and then proceeded to lift the clock tower off in one piece. After the protesters had been dispersed, the remainder of the pier was completely dismantled, away from the glare of publicity.

== Controversy ==
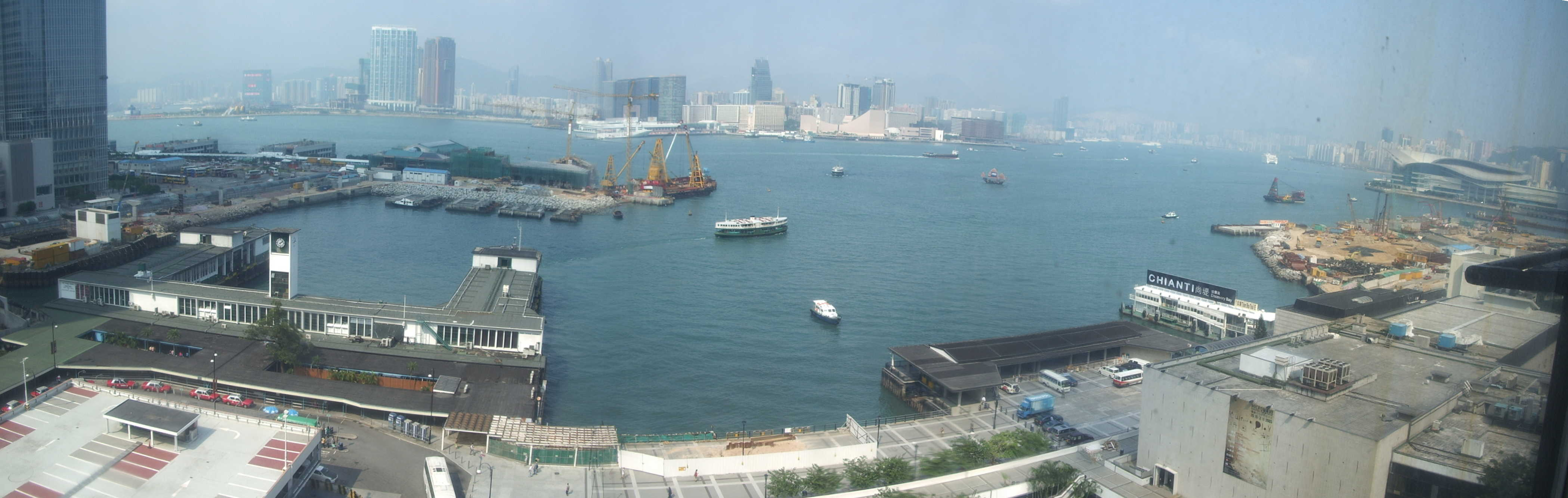
Old Star Ferry Pier (front left) and Queen's Pier (front right). The new piers (background left) now in full operation.

Although the scale of the phase 3 reclamation in Central was cut back from 32 to 18 hectares, the fate of the piers was sealed by the reclamation. The pier became the centre of a bitter struggle between the Government and conservationists, who opposed either further destruction of the harbour or the further loss of historical buildings.

Consultants who prepared the Environmental Impact Assessment report in 2001 for the Central reclamation noted the pier's significant role in Hong Kong's transport history. The Government was warned that a public backlash could be expected when the full implications of the reclamation were known.

The Pier, especially its clock tower, is a visually important landmark in Hong Kong. It is an eye-catching icon within the beautiful Hong Kong Harbour particularly for tourists and locals crossing it via Star Ferries from Tsim Sha Tsui. It is a must on their itinerary. No other ferry pier along the harbour could possibly perform such a symbolic function as this clocktower pier. The removal of the Star Ferry Pier to Piers 4–7 leading to its destruction would likely raise public objection and dismay.

— Chan Sui San, Peter, A survey report of Historical Buildings and Structures within the Project Area of the Central Reclamation Phase III"

However, the Government had maintained that the Pier and its tower was not old enough to be classified as "historical" and that people were not necessarily "concerned about the building itself". To some extent, it was not wrong, since the activists were mainly fighting for the preservation of a public place and against the methods and urban planning policies of its government, perceived to favour business interests over the public interest. The struggle to preserve the Star Ferry and, later, the Queen's Pier, was the occasion to raise questions on Hong Kong's history, the question of colonialism, and that of democracy in the HKSAR.

The Government had grossly underestimated the very strong public sentiment about this 49-year-old landmark in the "collective memory" of Hong Kong residents. By its own retrospective admission, it lacked legitimacy: a Government spokesman conceded that the it had failed to gain the moral high ground.

=== Loss of convenience ===
Ferry passengers would face a lengthier trek to reach the new pier. By relocating the new piers 300 m away, it is estimated that the Star Ferry could lose perhaps 13 per cent or more of passengers due to its inconvenience. On the Tsim Sha Tsui side of the harbour, the proposed relocation of the bus terminus which acts as a feeder for the ferry is forecast to further reduce passenger numbers by one-fifth.

This loss, totalling one-third of its passengers, would translate into revenue loss of some HK$17 million per annum for Star Ferry.

=== Architectural importance ===
Architects and conservationists argued that the pier was architecturally significant to Hong Kong as one of the last remaining examples of a Streamline Moderne public building (along with the Central Market and Wan Chai Market which have been earmarked for demolition); culturally the pier was widely recognised as a part of local collective memory. The Hong Kong Institute of Architects warned against the destruction of Hong Kong's heritage, saying it would be an irreversible mistake. Public opinion has resulted in alternatives put forward to preserve the clock tower, including moving the proposed six-lane road or relocating the clock tower to the front of the new pier as a memorial.

=== State of the clock ===
One reason cited by the Government against the relocation of the turret clock and tower was that an expert feasibility study advised that there was "no guarantee the clock and chimes would continue to work after relocation, due to their age and obsolete components". However, Neil Brennon Wright of Thwaites & Reed, the world's longest operating clockmaking firm, who arrived from England on 18 December 2006 to examine the clock, said that his firm had restored far worse.

The Government promised that it would "rebuild" the chimes of the clock, complete with the restitution of the original clock faces and mechanism at some nearby location.

== Public sentiment ==
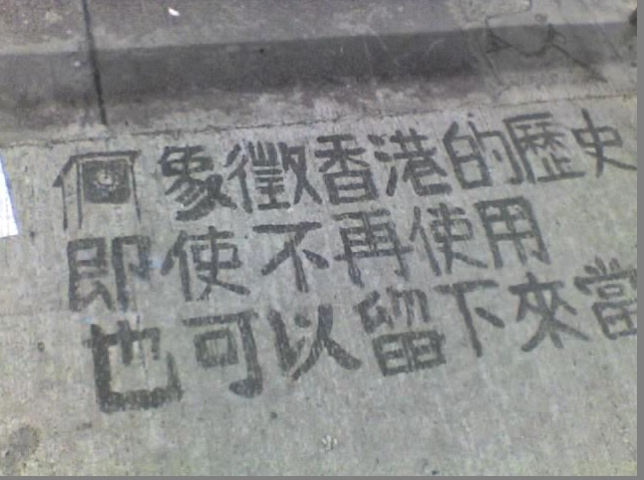
Pavement graffito at Star Ferry urging conservation of clock tower

The public outcry, anticipated by the consultancy report for the Antiquities and Monuments Office, was to become reality. With the imminent threat of demolition, the local community rallied to save pier, to widespread media coverage. In the weeks running up to the cessation of service from the pier, thousands of Hong Kong residents arrived to post banners and other messages in support of retention.

There were some 150,000 nostalgic visitors to the Pier and harbour crossing on the night of 11 November 2006. To mark the special occasion, Star Ferry hosted a "last ride" before the pier was closed-down, with the last four ferries leaving this pier on the stroke of midnight. Eighteen hundred Hongkongers willingly paid up $88 (40 times the normal fare) for the last ride, whose proceeds were designated for charity.

=== Protest movement ===
On 19 November 2006, the Civic Party, Democratic Party, Harbour-front Enhancement Committee, Hong Kong Institute of Architects, People's Sustainable Development Committee, Clear the Air, and Earth Care jointly met to urge the public to fight for the preservation of the pier. Over 1,000 signatures were collected on that one day alone, in a petition to be submitted to Chief Executive Donald Tsang and other senior officials. In addition, a group of protesters began a peaceful sit-in that day. So Sau Chung, veteran campaigner (now a monk), whose hunger strike against Star Ferry fare increases triggered the riots in 1966, came by to lend his support.

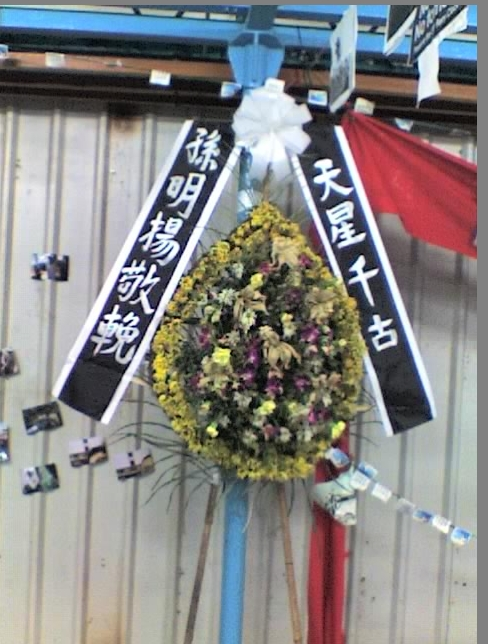
Satirical funeral wreath sent on behalf of Michael Suen

Further spurred by the start of demolition on the afternoon of 12 December 2006, more protesters started gathering spontaneously after workers removed the bell and the clock face from the tower, leaving a big hole. Activists, including "Long Hair" Leung Kwok-hung, rushed into and occupied part of the demolition site, chanting slogans from the roof of an excavator and demanded to meet Secretary for Housing, Planning and Lands, Michael Suen Ming-yeung. Protesters formed a human chain at the entrance of the construction site so as to try to stop the construction crew and machines from further demolishing the site.

In addition to the public, Civic Party legislators, and Choy So-yuk, a councillor from the pro-government Democratic Alliance for the Betterment of Hong Kong, showed up to lend support.

The demolition drew widespread condemnation from the public, legislators, and conservationists, all of whom claimed the government action was contrary to the wishes of the public. Legco members tabled motions to immediately halt the demolition, pending further consultation. The Government denied a last-minute reprieve, reiterating that there has been "adequate consultation", and forged ahead with demolition. The Conservancy Association claimed it made its objection known in 1996 when Government proposed to construct a temporary road through the Edinburgh Place and that the Government has never consulted the public regarding demolition of the pier, or the adjacent Queen's Pier.

After the demolition of the pier, the government said that it would consider the memories of the citizens and not the historic value of the building/structure before demolishing it.

Conservationists vowed to take the fight to Queen's Pier, and a number of other historical sites threatened with a similar fate. At the end of 2006, in a testament to how the protests have struck a chord with the public, the Ferry protesters were voted "Person of the Year" by RTHK Radio 3. Local Action, the group of rather young cultural and media activists which formed the core of the movement, were to later influence social movements, in Hong Kong as well as in the mainland: part of the more militant "post 80s" generation, they are critical of government business collusion, a one-sided development approach, Hong Kong's subordinate status within China and the perceived lack of democracy in the territory, and have been involved in the fight for real political reform in Hong Kong, and against the Express Rail link to Guangzhou.

=== Demonstration timeline ===
- August 2006, a group of local artists subsequently known as "We Are Society" and patronised by Para/Site member Kith Tsang Tak-ping started carrying out shows and setting up installations on the premises of the Star Ferry Pier in an attempt to heighten people's awareness.
- 19 November 2006, pressure groups met at pier to collect petition signatures; protesters began sit-in at the pier.
- 6 December 2006, demolition workers broke through a human chain of peaceful protesters and erected scaffolding around the site.
- 12 December 2006, site occupied by demonstrators determined to stop demolition.
- 13 December 2006, demolition resumed after all demonstrators were forcibly removed from the site by police, despite protesters remaining outside.
- 14 December 2006, 200 people attended a candlelight vigil to mark the pier's 49th anniversary; activists again broke through a police cordon to retake the building. 13 protesters were detained in the early hours of the morning

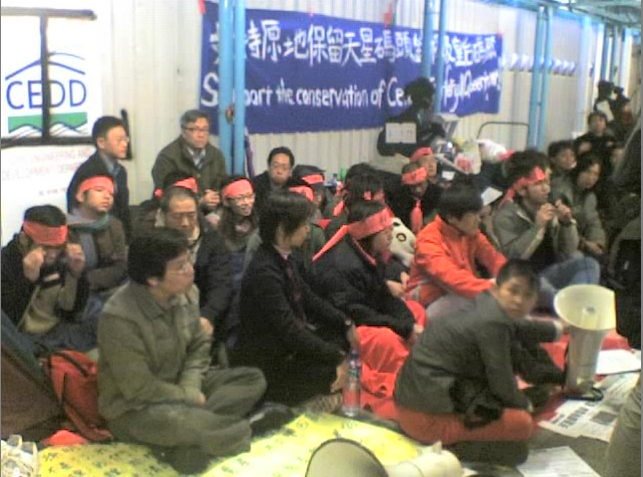
Student sit-in to protest against the demolition of the pier, 16 December 2006

- 15 December 2006, Government vows to get tough against protesters and accelerates demolition by carrying on work overnight; the clock tower is lifted off in one piece and taken off-site. A group of 20 students start a 49-hour sit-in hunger strike at midnight, one hour to represent each year of the pier's existence.
- 17 December 2006, 200 people marched on the Government Headquarters demanding to see the Chief Executive; violent scuffles broke out; Conservationists vow to take the fight to Queen's Pier.
- 18 December 2006, legislators incensed at a volte-face by the demolition company who recanted on selling the remains to conservationists and by suggestion that the clock tower may be used as landfill, demanded to know the whereabouts of the remains.
- 19 December 2006, newspapers published interviews of witnesses who claim to have seen the old clock tower being broken up at the building waste landfill in Tuen Mun.
- 11 May 2007, harbour protester Ho Loy convicted of criminal damage for having slashed the canvas surrounding the demolition works on 12 December 2006 and ordered to pay $800 in compensation.

== See also ==
- List of demolished piers in Hong Kong
- Central Police Station
- Heritage conservation in Hong Kong
- Lee Tung Street
- Yau Ma Tei Police Station
