= Hong Kong City Hall =

Municipal building in Central, Hong Kong

Coordinates: 22°16′57″N 114°9′41″E

- 香港大會堂
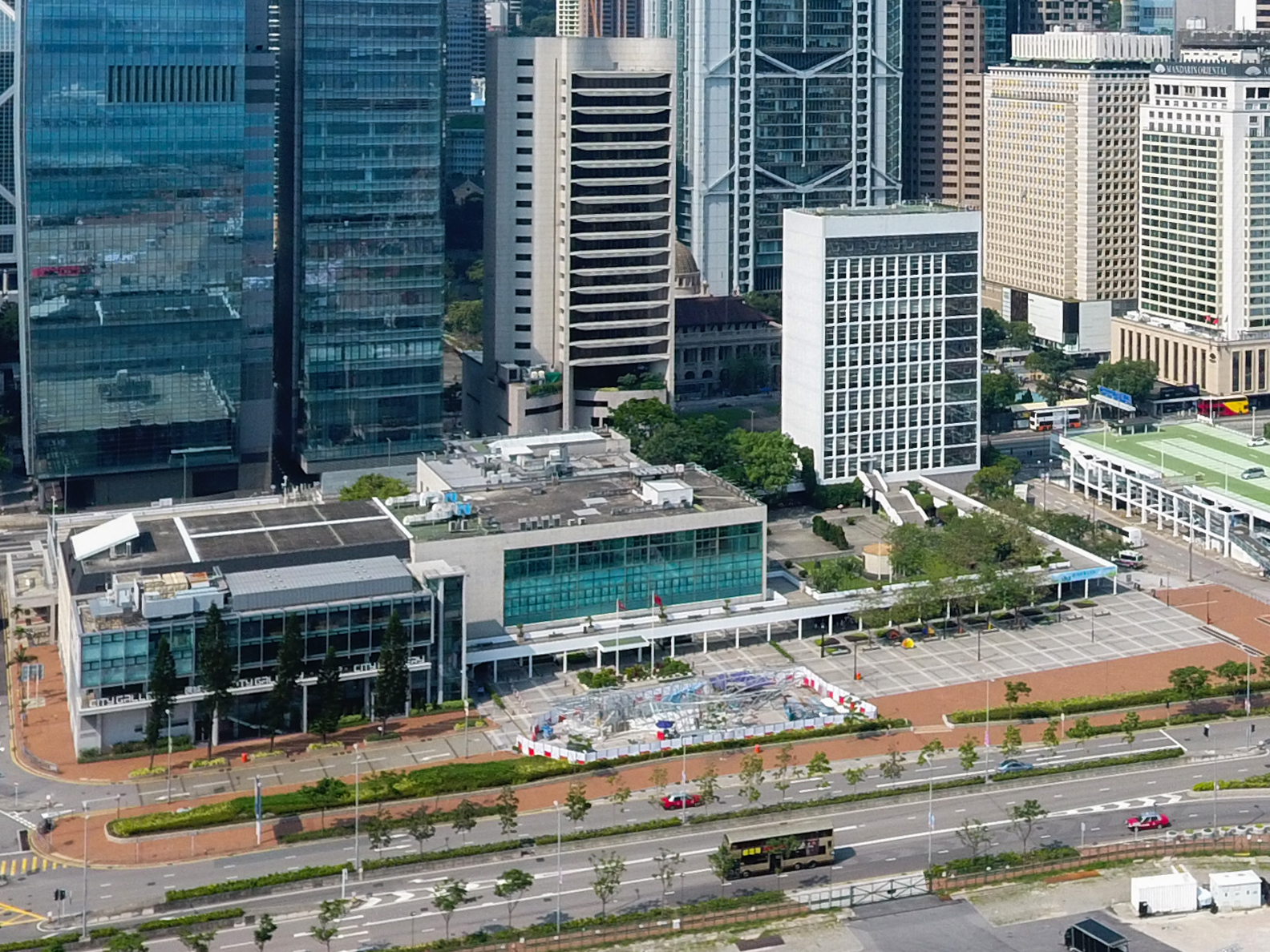
- Hong Kong City Hall in 2017
- Interactive map of the Hong Kong City Hall area

General information
- Type: City hall
- Architectural style: International Style
- Location: Central, City of Victoria, 5 Edinburgh Place, Hong Kong (special administrative region of China)
- Groundbreaking: 25 February 1960; 66 years ago
- Completed: 2 March 1962; 64 years ago
- Owner: Hong Kong Government
- Landlord: Leisure and Cultural Services Department

Technical details
- Material: Steel & concrete
- Grounds: 10,000 square metres (110,000 sq ft)

Design and construction
- Architects: Gordon Brown; Ronald Phillips; Alan Fitch

Declared Monument of Hong Kong
- Designated: 20 May 2022; 4 years ago
- Reference no.: 132

Hong Kong City Hall
- Traditional Chinese: 香港大會堂
Transcriptions
Yue: Cantonese
- Yale Romanization: Hēung góng daaih wuih tòhng
- Jyutping: Hoeng1 gong2 daai6 wui6 tong4

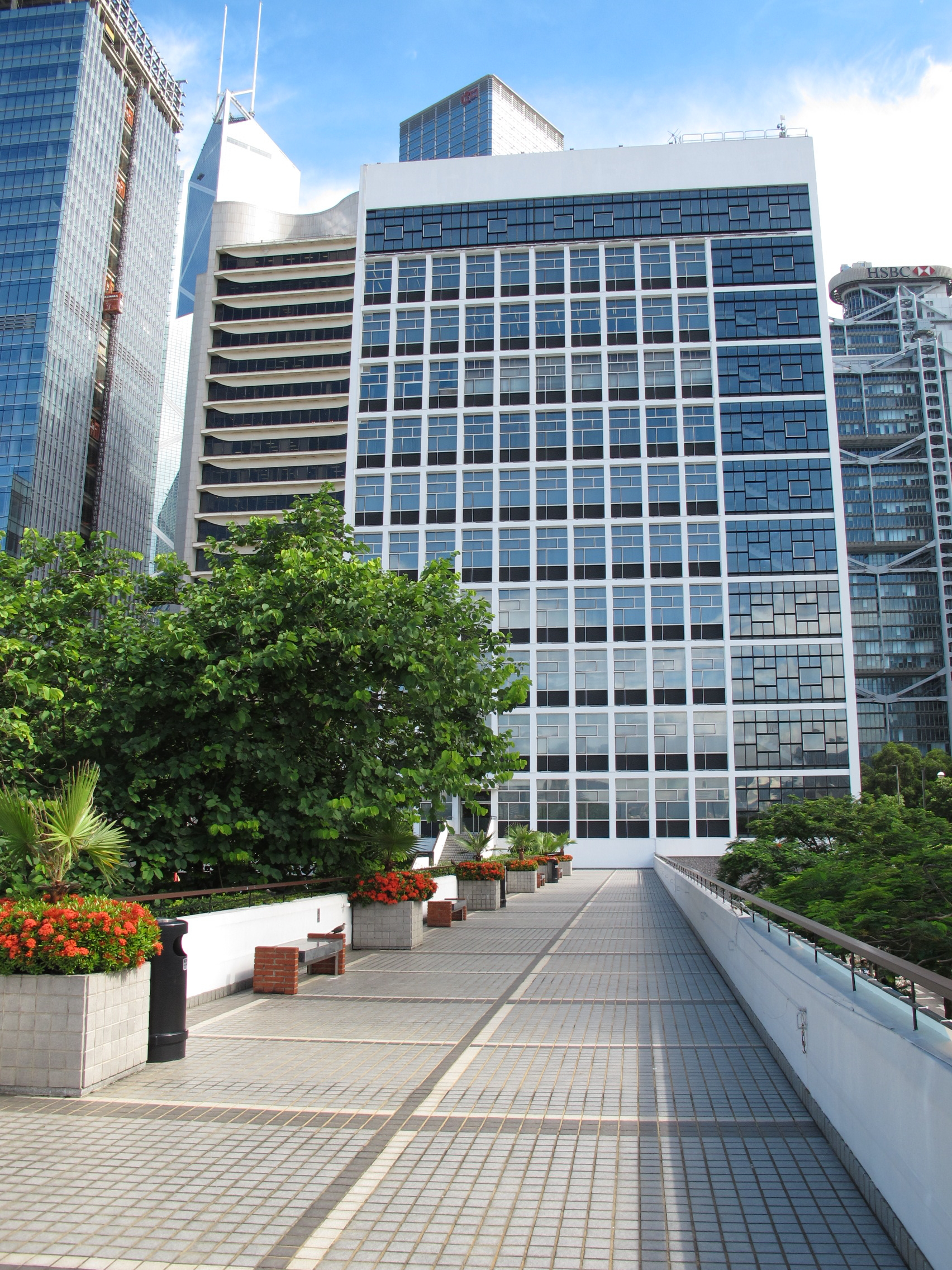
City Hall High Block north façade in 2012.

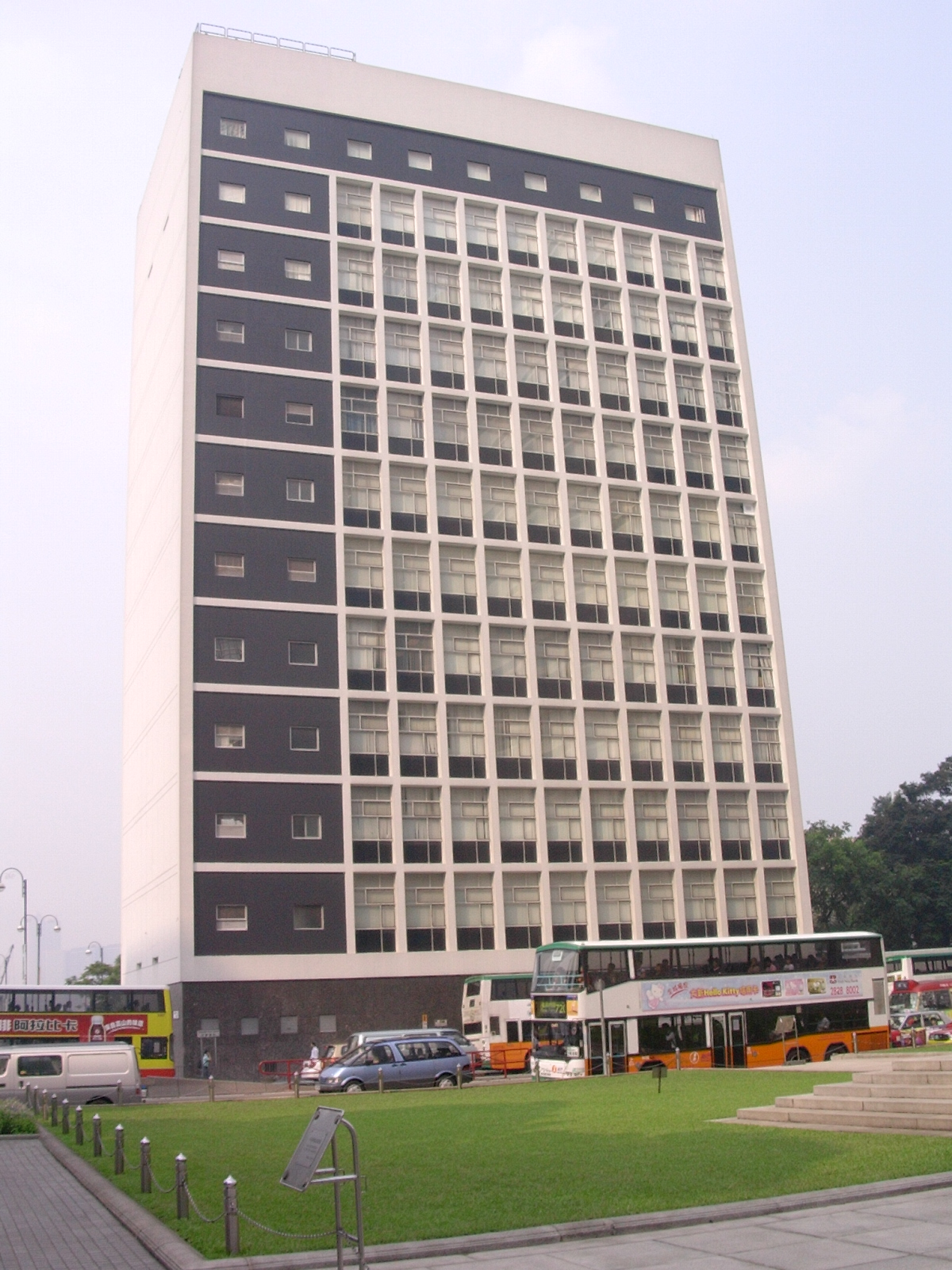
City Hall High Block south façade, viewed from Statue Square in 2004.

Hong Kong City Hall (HKCH, Chinese: 香港大會堂) is a building located at Edinburgh Place, Central, Hong Kong Island, Hong Kong.

In the 19th century, the British founded the City of Victoria in the present-day Central after the establishment of the Crown Colony of Hong Kong. The Crown Colony (including the City of Victoria) was governed by a Governor and Urban Council, there was no mayor or city council, therefore, the City Hall does not hold the offices of a city government, unlike most city halls around the world. Instead, it is a complex providing municipal services, including performing venues and libraries.

The City Hall is managed by the Government's Leisure and Cultural Services Department. The Urban Council (UrbCo) managed the City Hall (through the Urban Services Department) and held its meetings there prior to its dissolution in December 1999. Prior to its dissolution the UrbCo served as the municipal council for Hong Kong Island and Kowloon (including New Kowloon). The UrbCo had its meeting chamber in the Low Block of the City Hall.

== First generation ==
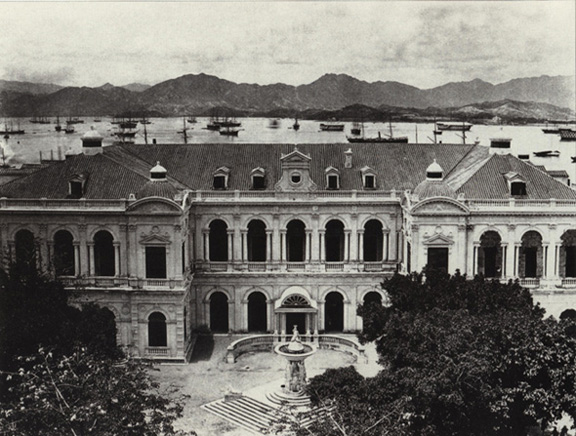
The 1869 City Hall, southern aspect, with Dent's Fountain at the middle.

Hong Kong's first City Hall was designed by the French architect Achille-Antoine Hermitte and was opened by Prince Alfred, Duke of Edinburgh in a ceremony on 28 June 1869, it occupied the current sites of the HSBC Hong Kong headquarters building (partly) and the Bank of China Building until its demolition in 1933.

The current site of the HSBC Hong Kong headquarters building was occupied in part by the old City Hall, and in part by the first and second generations of the HSBC building.

== Second generation ==
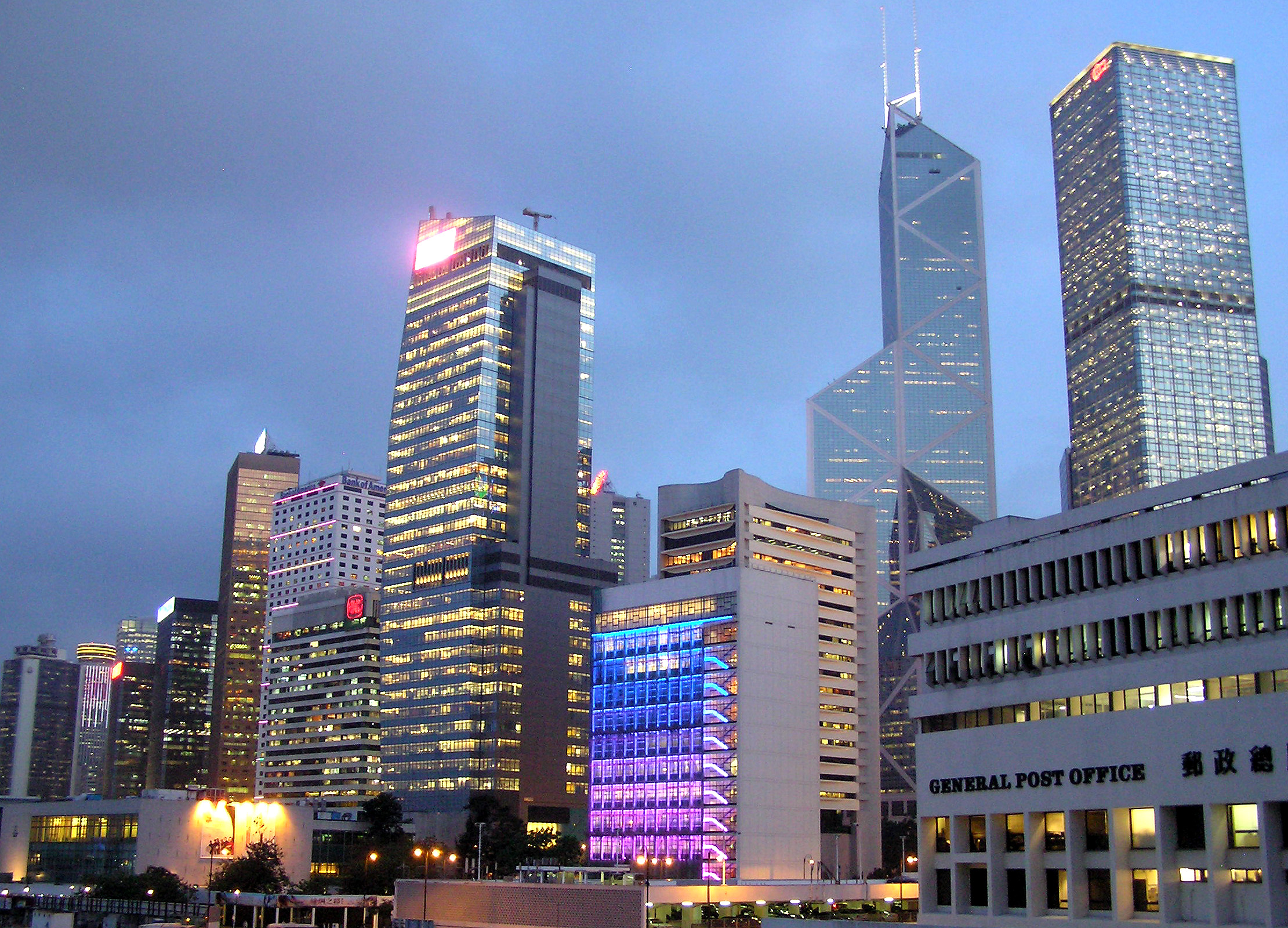
The City Hall and its surroundings in May 2010.

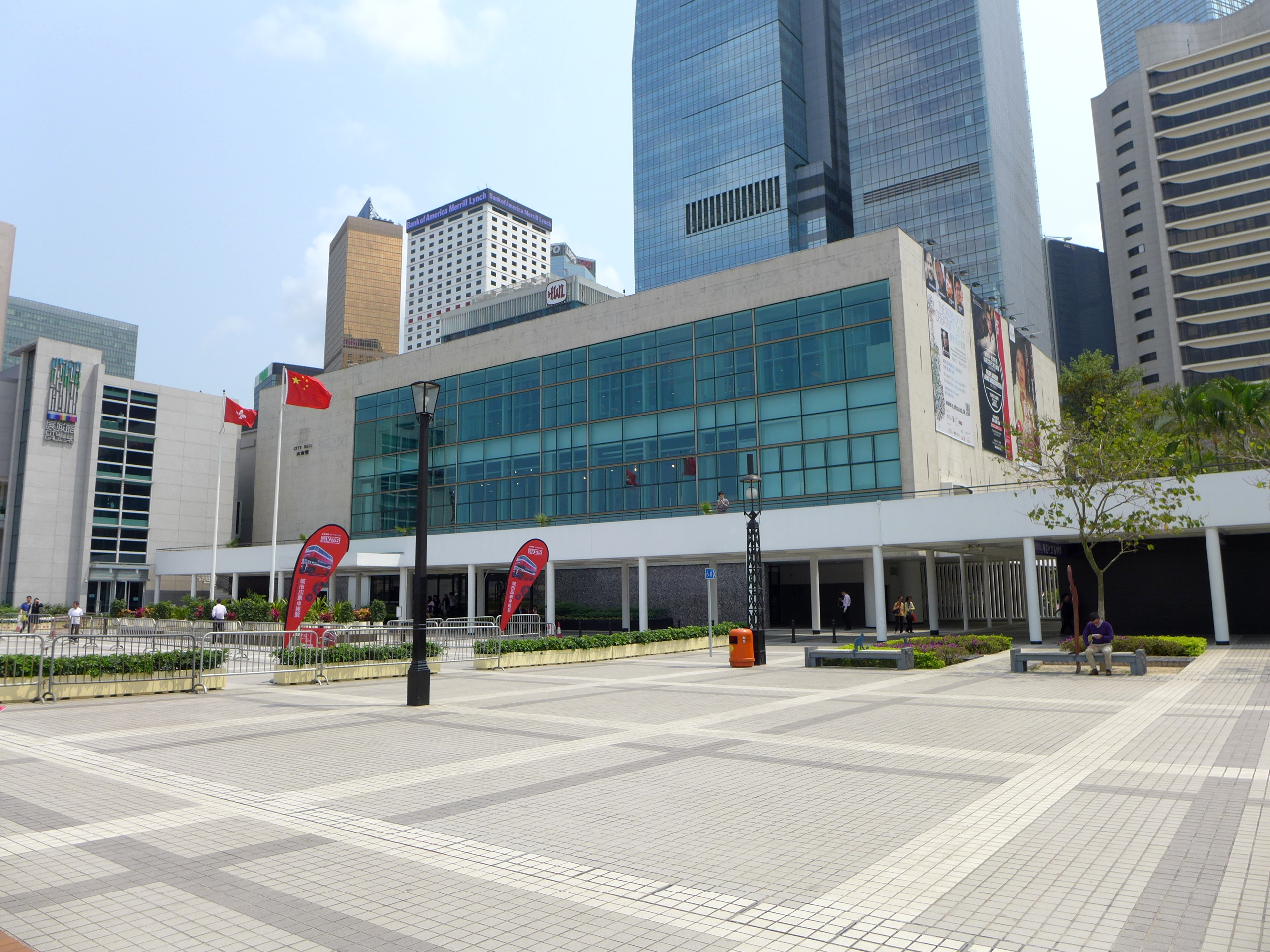
City Hall Lower Block in April 2014

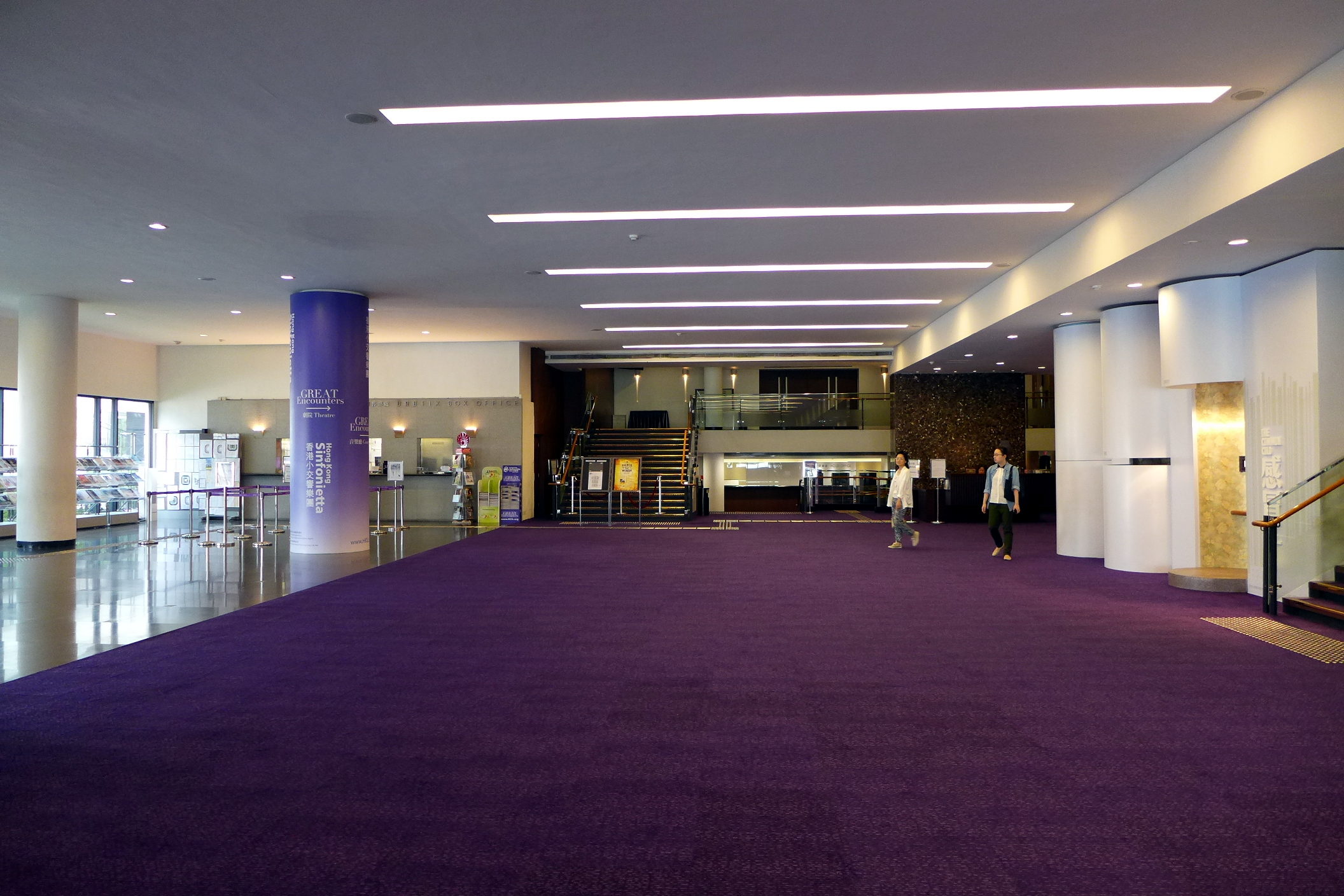
Lower Block Lobby in November 2014

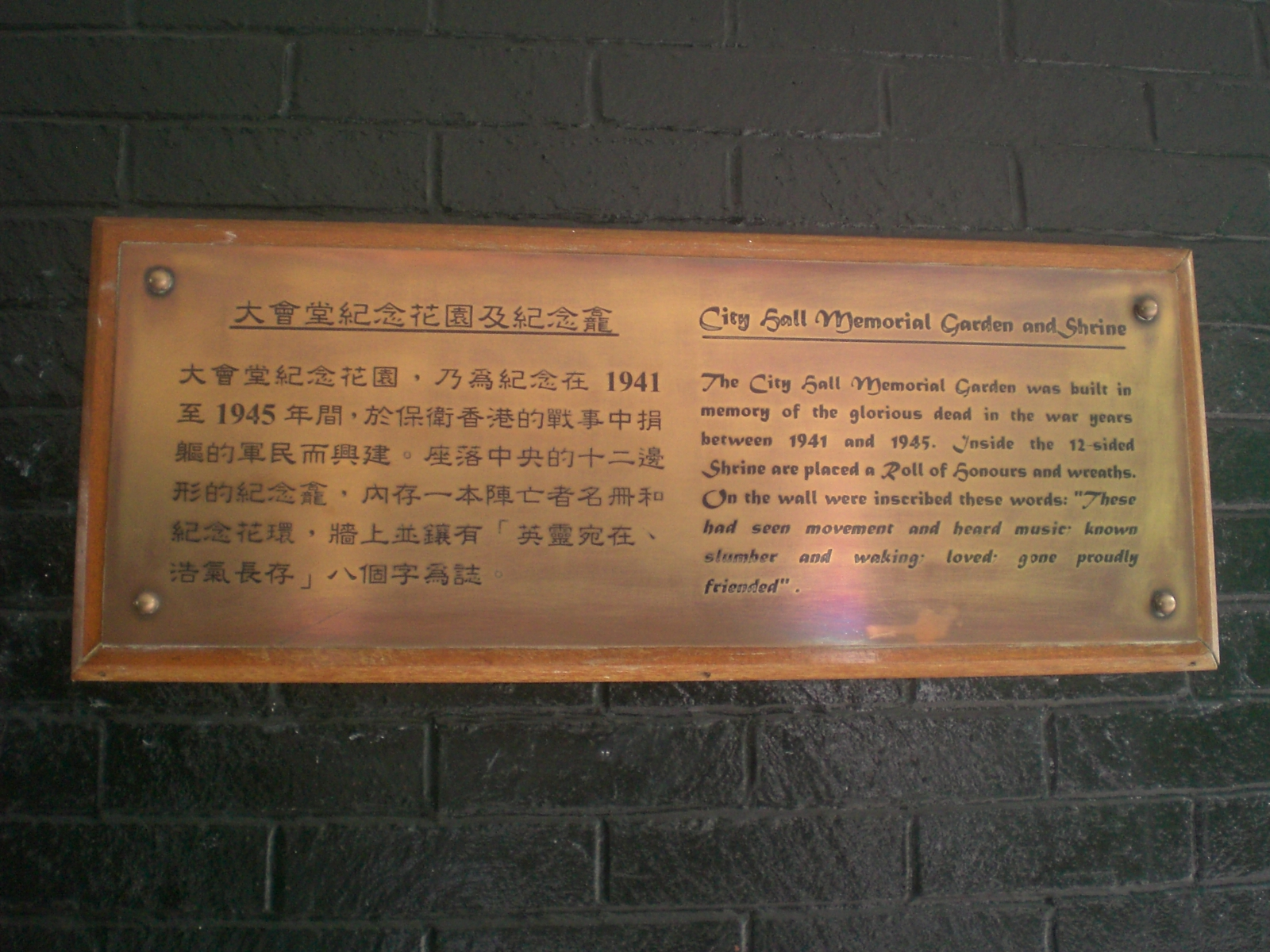
Commemorative plaque dedicated to all those who defended Hong Kong between 1941 and 1945 at the entrance to Memorial Gardens at Hong Kong City Hall. Taken in October 2009.

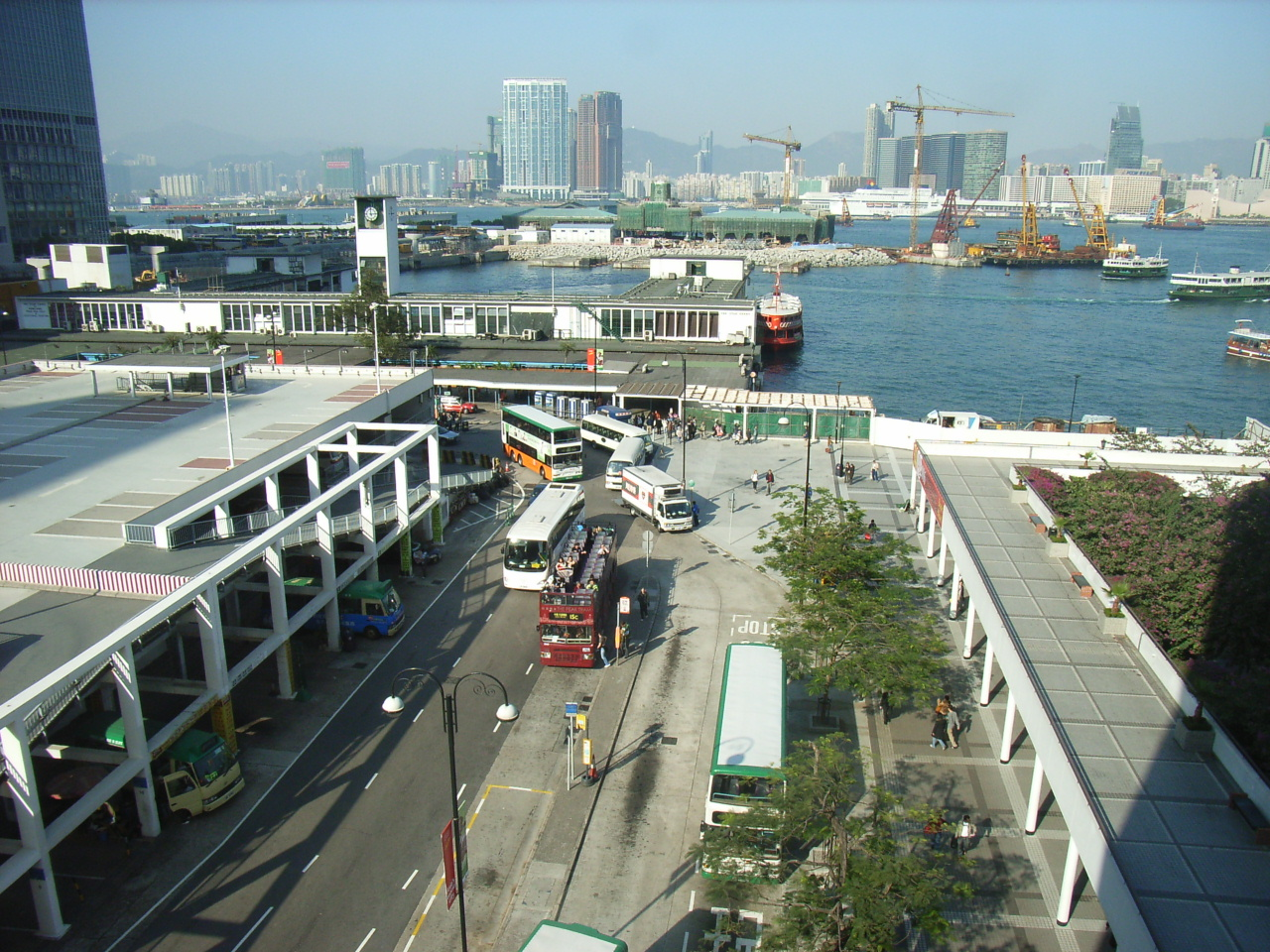
Sea view from the City Hall High Block, in December 2005, with Edinburgh Place Ferry Pier still standing.

The second and current City Hall complex was built in the late 1950s following a public campaign led by the Sino-British Club for the re-establishment of a civic centre in Hong Kong. It was built on a 10,000 square metres (110,000 sq ft) plot of land on the newly reclaimed seafront, about 200 metres (660 ft) from the first generation building.

The foundation stone laying ceremony took place on 25 February 1960 with Sir Robert Brown Black, then Governor of Hong Kong, who also presided over the official opening ceremony on 2 March 1962. The City Hall was placed under the responsibility of the Urban Council.

Since 2009, it had been listed as a Grade I historic building. On 20 May 2022, the Hong Kong City Hall was declared a monument under the Antiquities and Monuments Ordinance. At the age of 60, it is the youngest as well as the first post-WW2 building in Hong Kong being declared as a monument.

=== Design ===
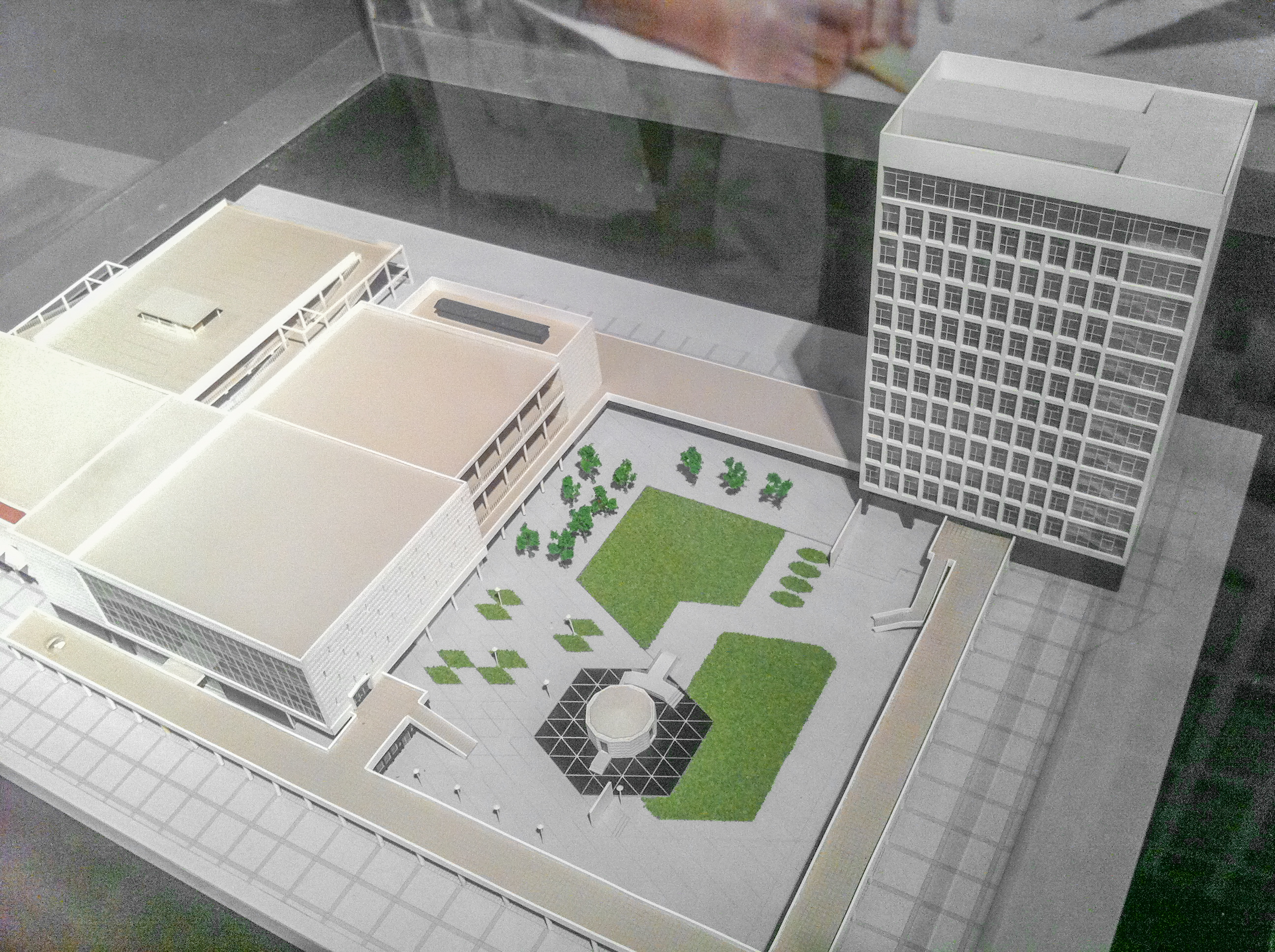
Model of City Hall, with High Block, Lower Block and Garden in August 2013.

The building complex erected at the present site based on the original design by Professor Gordon Brown, the first Head of Department of Architecture of Hong Kong University, together with his team including Patricia O'Reilly Mayne, was completed by British architects Ronald Phillips and Alan Fitch at the cost of HK$20 million. With its clean lines and stark geometric forms, the new Hall is an example of the International style fashionable at the time. The structure was constructed using steel and concrete, and much of the equipment was of steel, glass and anodised aluminium.

The two separate blocks and gardens were laid out as a cohesive whole, along a central axis. The entrance to the lower block (exhibition hall) of the City Hall formed an axis with Queen's Pier to lend a sense of occasion to visiting dignitaries. On the façade of the Lower Block once had the old coat of arms of Hong Kong, which was removed before the handover in 1997. One major consideration was juxtaposing the city bustle whilst maximising public access to the surrounding area. Thus, the out-sized public areas of the Memorial Gardens and the piazza in front were conceived as a natural extension to promote the "freedom of movement and a sense of unlimited space".

=== Function ===
The most important civic function performed by City Hall was as a ceremonial location for the swearing in of successive Governors following their inauguration: The 24th to 28th Governors all swore their oaths of office there.

City Hall's Concert hall and theatre have been an important home to the performing arts in Hong Kong since its inauguration. A number of culture events, including the Hong Kong Festival, Hong Kong Arts Festival in 1973, Asian Arts Festival in 1976, the Hong Kong International Film Festival in 1977, and the International Arts Carnival in 1982 were hosted there. The conference room of the former Urban Council was also at the lower building of the City Hall.

The High block once housed Hong Kong's principal public library, until a new Central library was opened in 2001; the Hong Kong art gallery (which became the Hong Kong Art Museum in 1969) began life there on the tenth and eleventh floors. The Hong Kong Museum of History relocated in 1975, and the Hong Kong Museum of Art also moved out of City Hall in 1991.

The City Hall Memorial Garden, located at the north-western quadrant between the High Block and Low Block, is a walled garden wherein a 12-sided dodecagon Memorial Shrine commemorates soldiers and citizens who died in defence of Hong Kong during the Second World War. It is a popular spot and obligatory backdrop for photographs of couples who celebrate their marriage in the City Hall Registry. Within the Memorial Shrine are embedded memorial Roll of Honour and Plaques to combat units who fought in Hong Kong during World War II (1941–1945). Inscribed on the walls of the Memorial Shrine are eight Chinese characters evoking the everlasting spirit of the Brave and the Dead. The entrance gates to the City Hall Memorial Garden bear the regimental emblems of the Hong Kong Volunteer Defence Corps and Royal Hong Kong Regiment.

The complex also incorporates a three-storey car park, with 171 car park spaces, which was also designed by architects Ron Phillips and Alan Fitch.

== Facilities ==
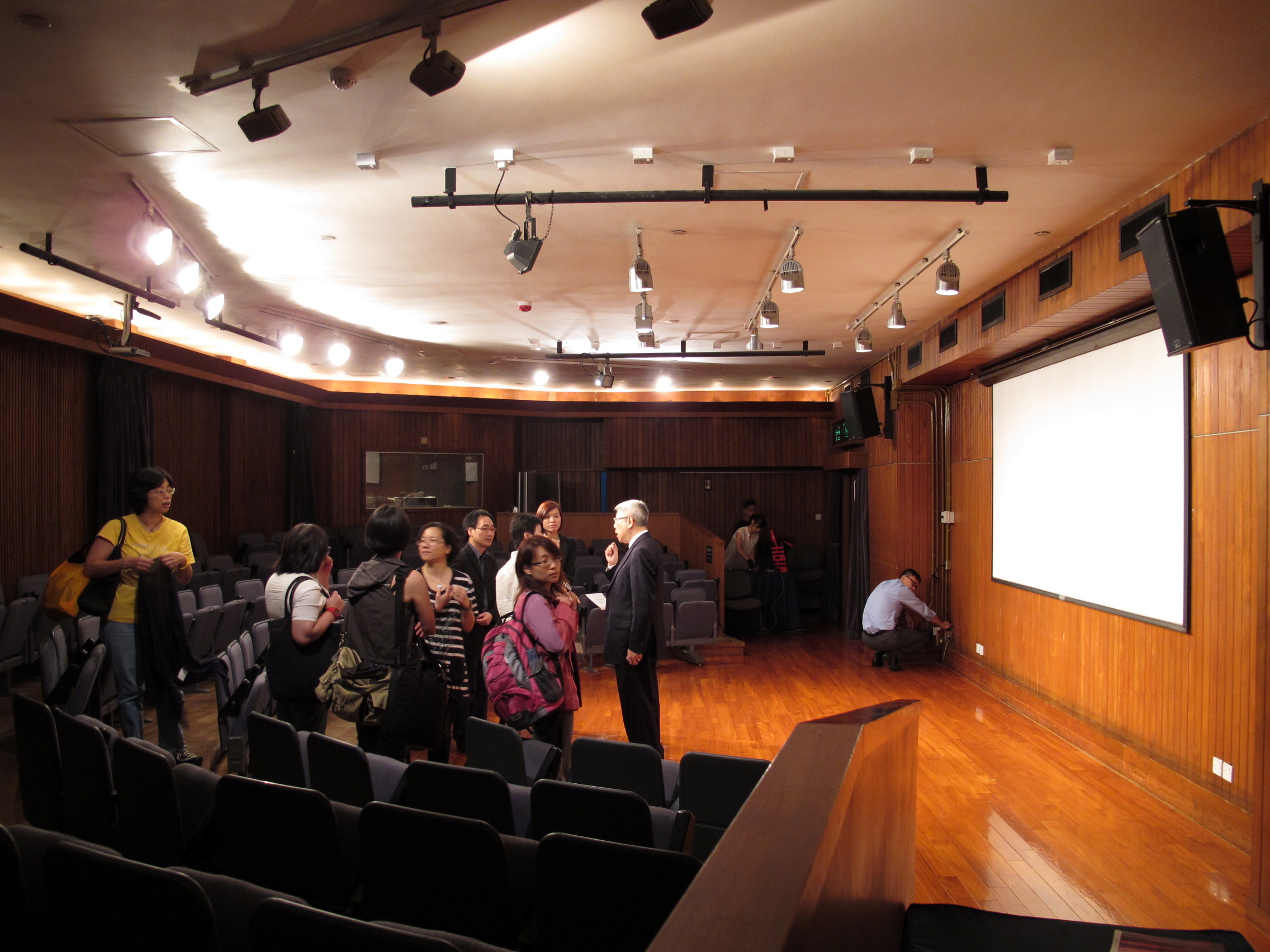
Recital Hall in High Block in May 2012

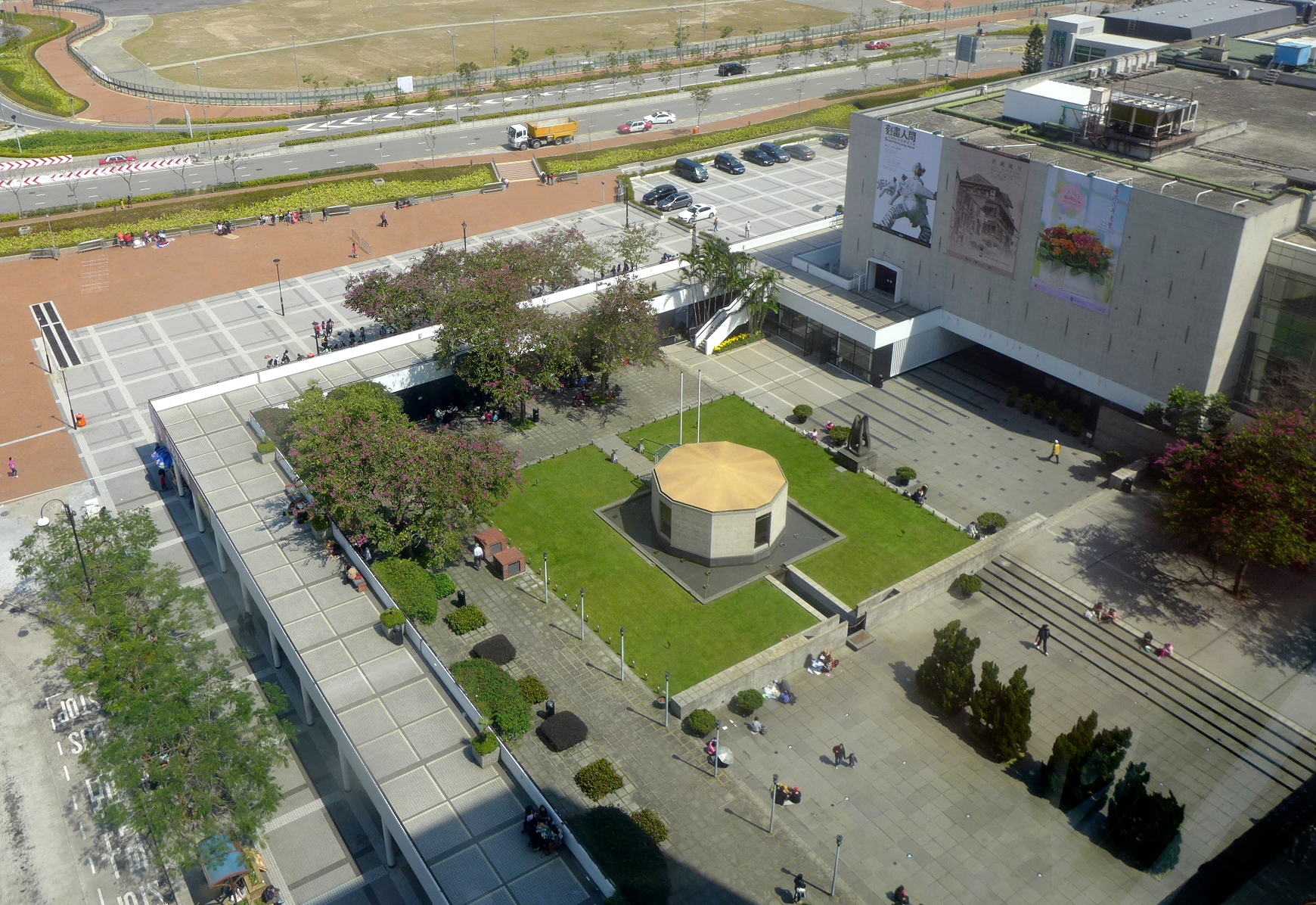
The memorial garden in the City Hall in February 2014

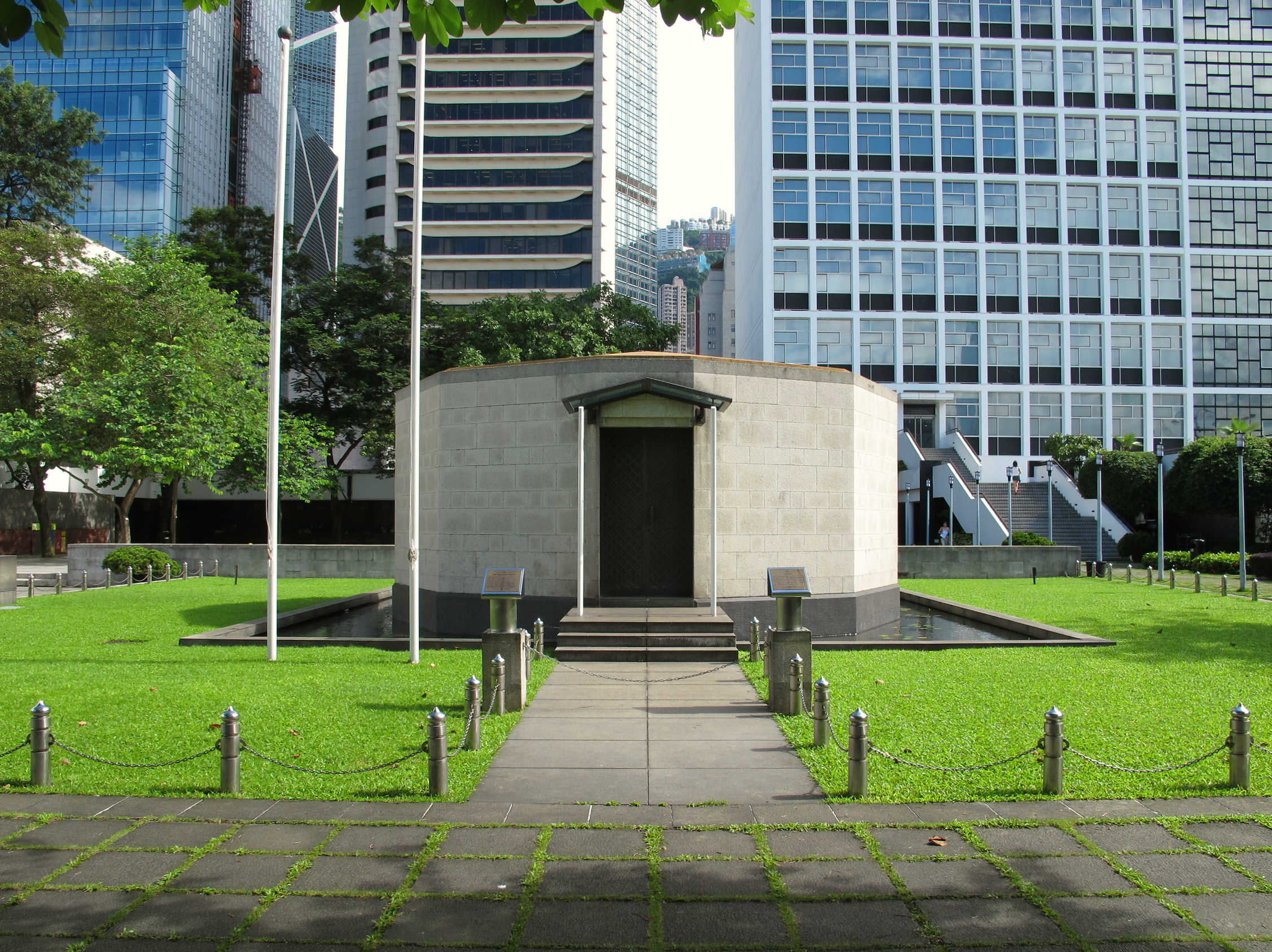
War memorial shrine in the memorial garden in July 2012

The second and current City Hall complex has two buildings, a garden and a three-storey car park.

City Hall Memorial Garden enclosing the World War II (1941–1945) Memorial Shrine

The High Block, a 12-storey building, is in the south-western end and houses a number of government facilities:

- City Hall Public Library, an eight-storey facility, which in the past served as the central library of Hong Kong (9th – 11th floors)
- Recital Hall with 111 seats (8th floor)
- Exhibition Gallery, 260 square metres (2,800 sq ft) (7th floor)
- Committee Rooms: two 40-seat committee rooms, each 35 square metres (380 sq ft) (7th floor)
- Marriage Registry (1st floor)
- Maxim's MX fast food restaurant, run by Maxim's Caterers (ground floor)

The 3-storey Low Block is at the eastern end, with the following facilities:

- Exhibition Hall, 590 square metres (6,400 sq ft) (first floor)
- HK Collectables Arts Shop (first floor)
- Concert Hall with 1,430 seats and 60 standees (mezzanine)
- Restaurants and a cafe, run by Maxim's Caterers: Chinese (City Hall Maxim's Palace), Continental (Deli and Wine), and European (City Hall Maxim's Café) cuisines
- Theatre with 463 seats
- URBTIX Box Office (foyer)
- Enquiry counter (foyer)

=== High Block floor directory ===
All floors are designed to be accessible.

11th floor	Reference Library / Business and Industry Library; Multimedia Resource Centre
10th floor	Reference Library (Entrance); Creativity and Innovation Resource Centre
9th floor	Newspapers and Periodicals Reading Room
8th floor	Recital Hall; Extension Activities Room
7th floor	Exhibition Gallery; Committee Room South/North
6th floor	Computer and Information Centre; Office of Computerization Unit, Hong Kong Public Libraries
5th floor	Basic Law Library; Adult Lending Library
4th floor	Adult Lending Library
3rd floor	Adult Lending Library (Entrance); Circulation Counter
2nd floor	Junior Library
1st floor	Marriage Registry
Ground floor	Library Cloakroom

== See also ==
- City Gallery (Hong Kong)
- List of concert halls
- List of libraries in Hong Kong

Other civic centres in Hong Kong:

- Sai Wan Ho Civic Centre
- Sha Tin Town Hall
- Tsuen Wan Town Hall

Nearby sites:

- HMS Tamar
- Chater Garden
- Statue Square and the Cenotaph
- HSBC Building (Hong Kong)
- Court of Final Appeal Building
