= Cleverley =

Surname list

Cleverley is an English surname. Notable people with this surname include the following:

- Alf Cleverley (1907–1972), New Zealand boxer
- Ben Cleverley (b. 1981), British footballer
- Charlotte Cleverley-Bisman (b. 2003), New Zealand vaccination campaign representative
- Daisy Cleverley (b. 1997), New Zealand footballer
- Don Cleverley (1909–2004), New Zealand cricketer
- Samuel Cleverley (d. 1824), British physician
- Tom Cleverley (b. 1989), English football player, who plays for Watford

== See also ==
- Cleverly
