= Cleverly =

Cleverly is a surname. Notable people with the name include:

- Barbara Cleverly (born 1940), British author of detective fiction
- Charles St George Cleverly (1819–1897), second Surveyor General in Hong Kong
- Chris Cleverly (born 1967), British lawyer
- Harry Cleverly (1912–1968), American ice hockey and baseball coach at Boston University
- James Cleverly (born 1969), British Conservative Member of Parliament
- Marcus Cleverly (born 1981), Danish handballer
- Nathan Cleverly (born 1987), Welsh boxer
- Sir Osmund Somers Cleverly (1891–1966), Principal Private Secretary to the British Prime Minister
- Rhian Cleverly (born 1995), Welsh footballer

== See also ==
- Cleverley, surname with a similar spelling
- Cleverly estate, a Peabody Trust housing estate in Shepherd's Bush, London, completed in 1928
- Cleverly Street, Hong Kong
