= Government House, Hong Kong =

Official residence of the chief executive of Hong Kong

Government House
- 香港禮賓府
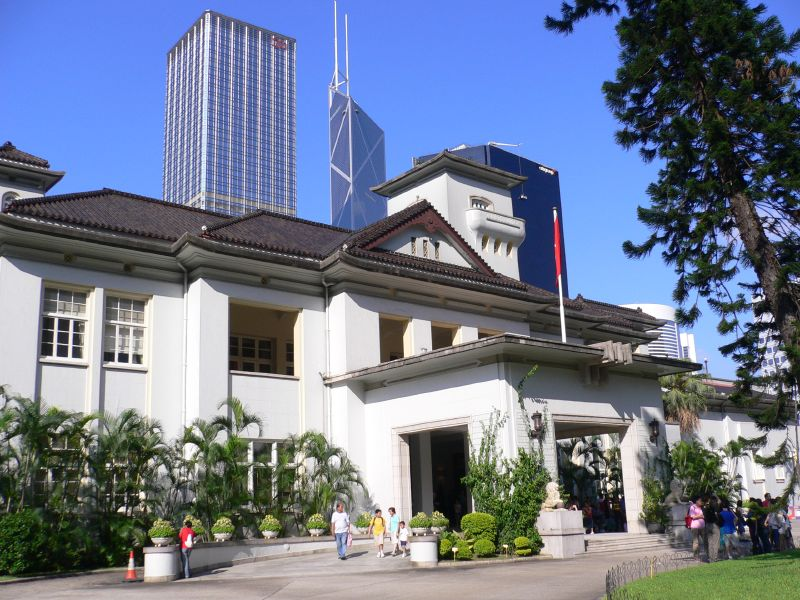
- Government House, Hong Kong

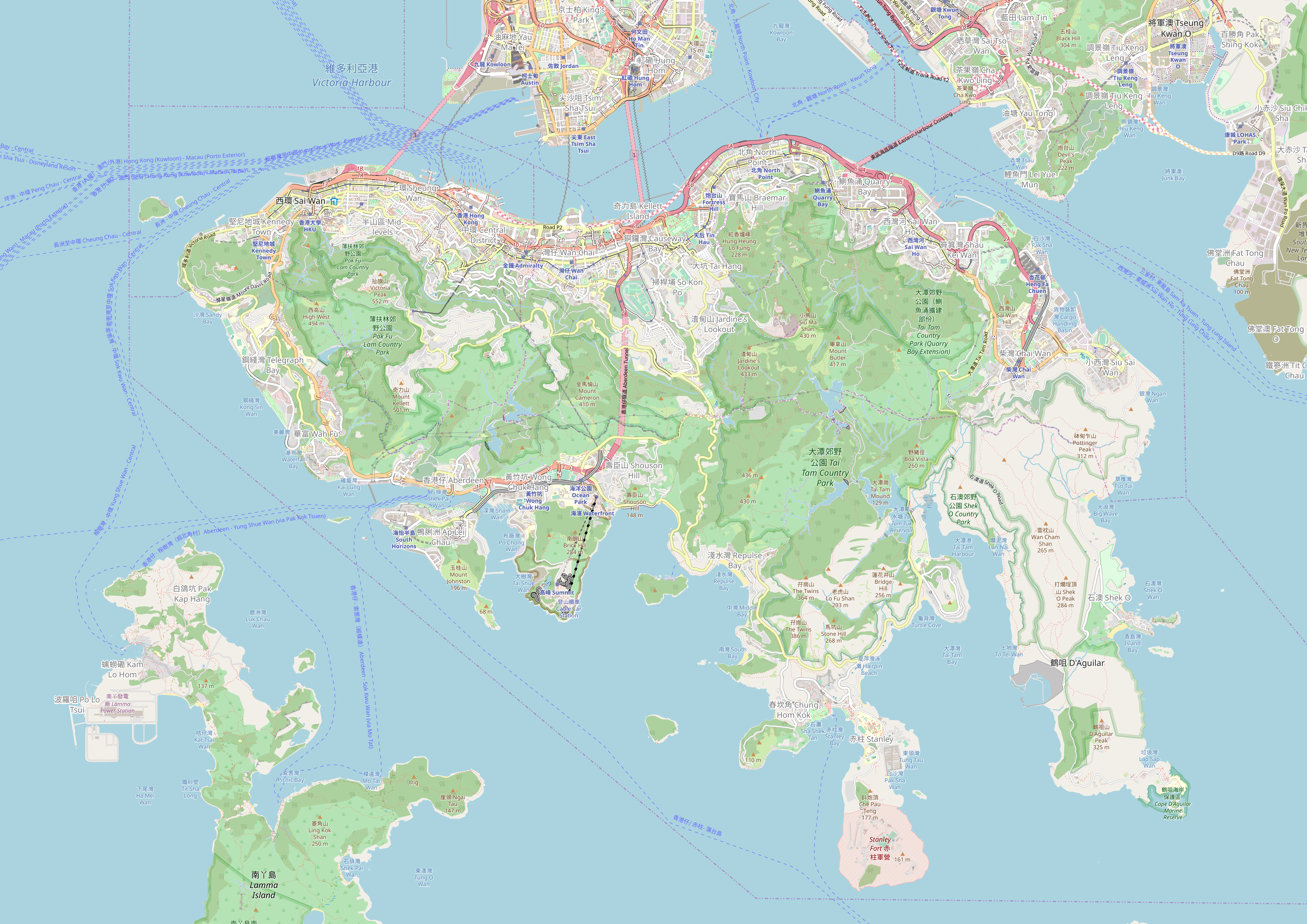
- Location within Hong Kong Island

General information
- Architectural style: Colonial Renaissance and hybrid Imperial Crown Style
- Location: Central, Hong Kong Special Administrative Region, China
- Coordinates: 22°16′43.19″N 114°09′26.70″E
- Current tenants: John Lee Ka-chiu, Chief Executive of Hong Kong
- Construction started: 1851; 175 years ago
- Client: Government of Hong Kong
- Owner: Government of Hong Kong
- Landlord: Government of Hong Kong

Design and construction
- Architect: Charles St George Cleverly

Government House, Hong Kong
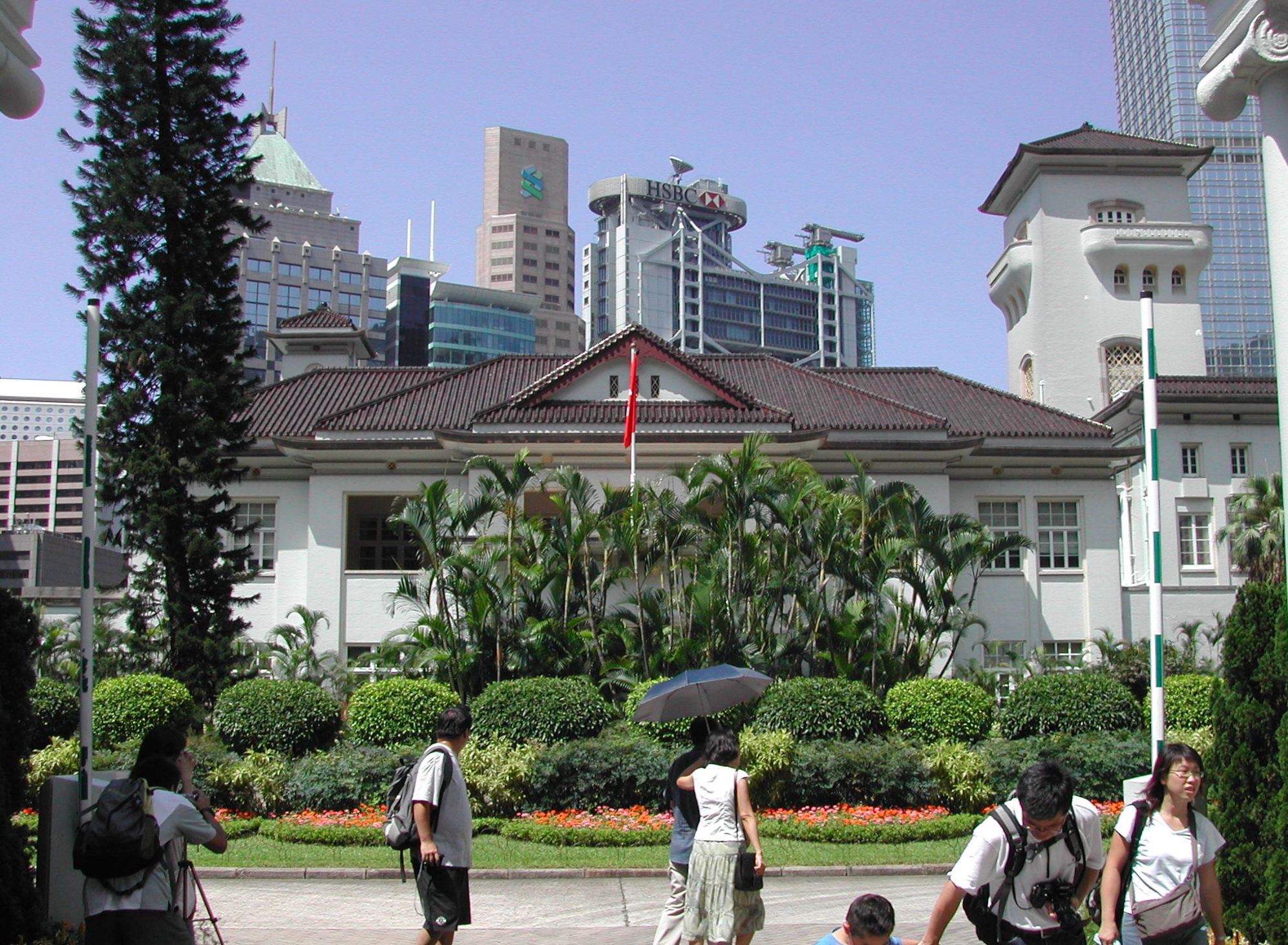
- The façade of the Government House
- Traditional Chinese: 香港禮賓府
- Simplified Chinese: 香港礼宾府
Transcriptions
Standard Mandarin
- Hanyu Pinyin: Xiānggǎng lǐbīnfǔ
- Wade–Giles: Hsiāngkǎng lǐpīnfǔ
- Yale Romanization: Syānggǎng lǐbīnfǔ
- IPA: [ɕjáŋkàŋ lìpínfù]
Yue: Cantonese
- Yale Romanization: Heūng góng laíh bīn fú
- Jyutping: Hoeng^{1} gong^{2} lai^{5} bin^{1} fu^{2}
- IPA: Cantonese pronunciation: [hœ́ŋkɔ̌ːŋ lɐ̬ipínfǔː]

Former name
- Traditional Chinese: 督憲府
Transcriptions
Yue: Cantonese
- Yale Romanization: Dūk hun fú
- Jyutping: Duk1 hin3 fu2

Former name
- Traditional Chinese: 香港總督府
Transcriptions
Yue: Cantonese
- Yale Romanization: Hēung Góng júng dūk fú
- Jyutping: Hoeng1 Gong2 zung2 duk1 fu2

Former name
- Traditional Chinese: 港督府
Transcriptions
Yue: Cantonese
- Yale Romanization: Góng dūk fú
- Jyutping: Gong2 duk1 fu2

Government House, located on Government Hill in Central, Hong Kong, is the official residence of the Chief Executive of Hong Kong. It was constructed in 1855 as a Colonial Renaissance-style building, but was significantly remodelled during the Japanese occupation, resulting in the current hybrid Japanese–neoclassical form.

Government House was the official residence of the Governor from 1855 to 1997, when the territory was under British rule. Of the 28 governors of Hong Kong, 25 have used this building as their official residence.

Located between Upper Albert Road and Lower Albert Road, Mid-Levels, Central, Government House is on a 24,000-square-metre (5.9-acre) plot of land. Its front elevation faces south towards the Peak, while below its northern part are the former Central Government Offices (currently the Justice Place).

Government House is a declared monument under the Antiquities and Monuments Ordinance.

== History and timeline ==
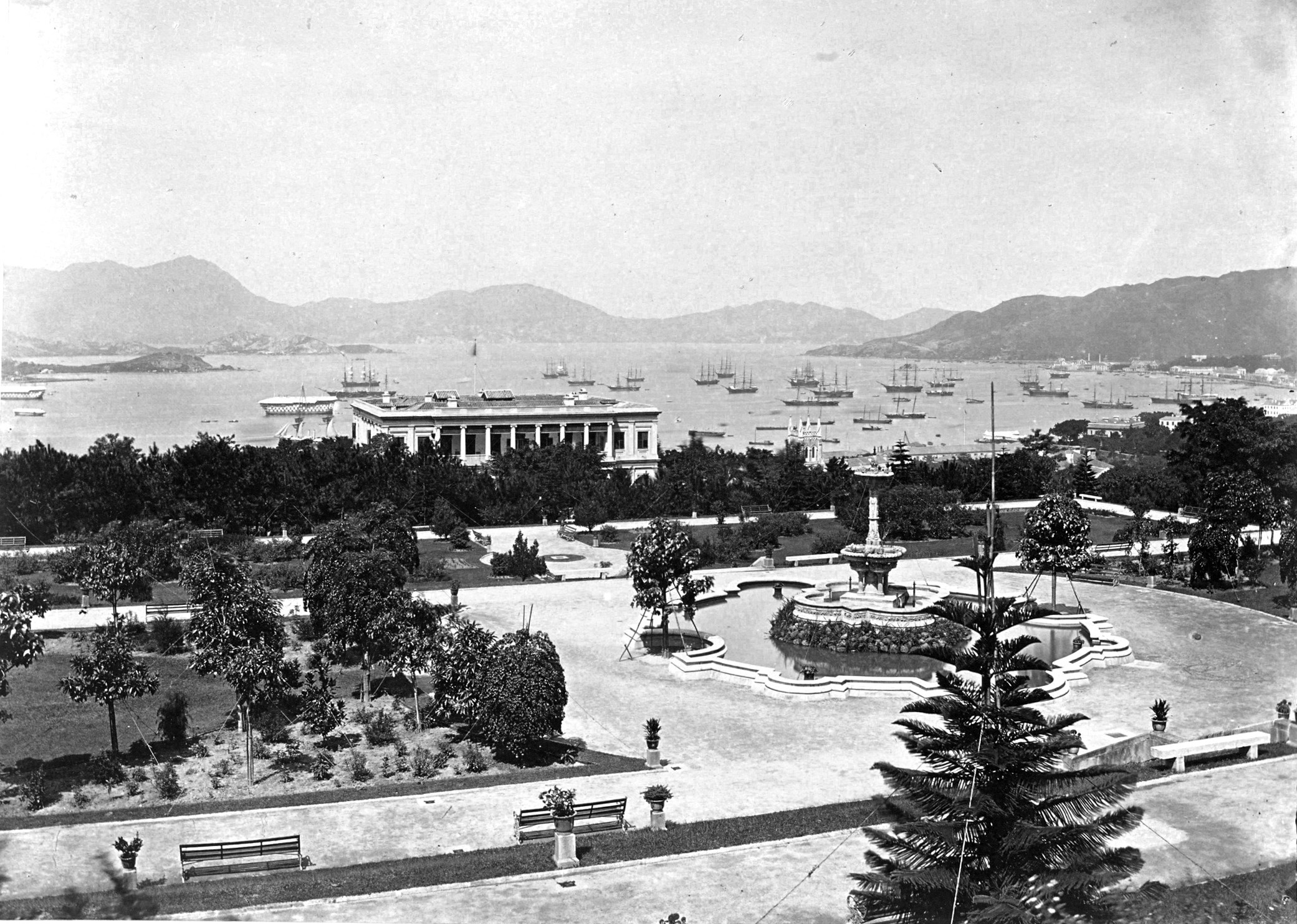
Botanical Garden & Government house (photo taken between 1860–1880)

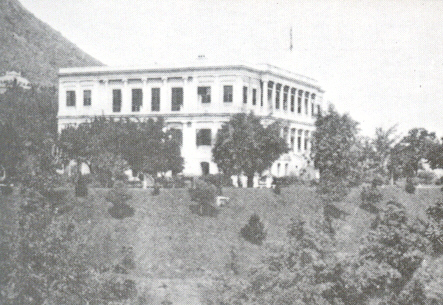
Government House in 1868

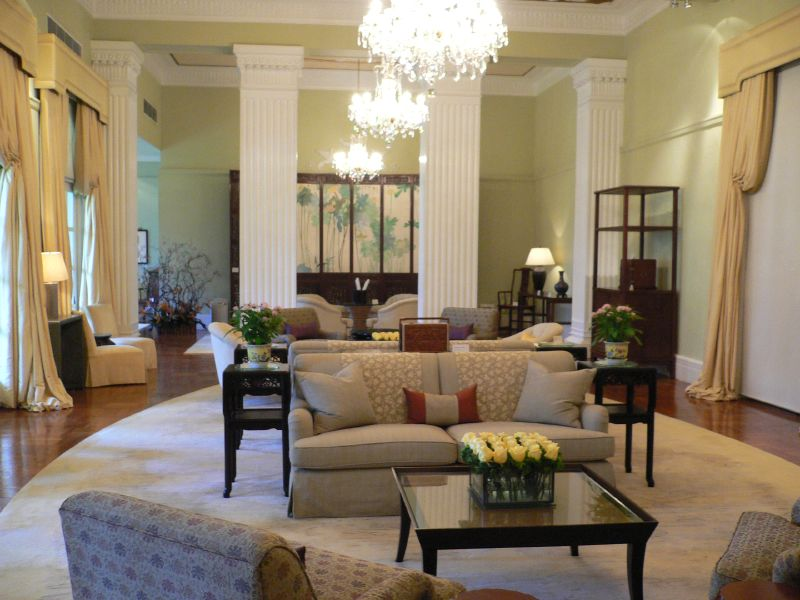
Living Room

1851: Eight years after Hong Kong became a British colony, construction of the house began on a design by Charles St George Cleverly, completing after four years. The first governor to take up residence was Sir John Bowring, the fourth governor of the territory.

1855–1930s: Government House also housed the Legislative Council of Hong Kong, using the ballroom from 1891 onwards.

1941–1945: During the Japanese occupation in the Second World War, it was occupied by the Japanese Military Governor. The form of the building altered to a hybrid Japanese/neoclassical style by Seichi Fujimura (藤村清一 Fujimura Seiichi) in 1944, primarily through the addition of a tower and roof elements.

16 September 1945: The Instrument of Surrender signed at Government House.

1946: Japanese fittings removed (the tower remains to this day).

1947–1957: Two stone carved lions placed at the entrance.

1971–1982: A kidney-shaped swimming pool installed in the garden.

1982–1986: An ornamental pool with a fountain created at the foot of the main stairs leading down from the north veranda.

1987–1992: A small pergola on the lower terrace erected and the water feature of the main garden staircase converted into an impressive planter.

1995: Government House declared a monument under the Antiquities and Monuments Ordinance.

1997: The final and 28th governor, Chris Patten vacates Government House. After the transfer of sovereignty over Hong Kong from the UK to the People's Republic of China, the house acted primarily as a reception for ceremonies (such as the conferring of honours and formal banquets) whilst the first chief executive, Tung Chee Hwa, remained at his own home, Grenville House.

1997–2005: A bonsai gallery introduced in the veranda.

2005–2012: An outdoor fish pond added in the back garden.

January 2006: Donald Tsang, the second Chief Executive, moves into Government House, following extensive renovations at an estimated cost of HK$14.5 million, criticised by The Standard, including a sum of HK$300,000 allocated to a new fish pond designed to accommodate Tsang's collection of koi.

2012–2017: A three-bin composting system added in the back garden.

2017: One of the tennis courts converted into a landscaped area.

2022: HK$2.8 million spent on renovations of the house, prior to the fifth Chief Executive John Lee moving in.

== Major features ==
=== Exterior ===
The main entrance of the house faces south towards Victoria Peak. Down on the northern side is the Former Central Government Offices, where most government secretariat offices were situated until 2011.

The carriage porch at the front with granite frames is a notable architectural feature of Government House.

The exterior is plastered in the Art Deco style, and the blend of architectural styles with each subsequent addition imparts its character and historical significance reflective of its history of more than a century.

=== Garden ===
Government House has a front lawn and a back garden with dazzling flowers. Originally planted in 1919, the multi-coloured azaleas bloom every spring. There is also a rare species of tree, Brownea grandiceps (Rose of Venezuela), originating from South America and listed in the Register of Old and Valuable Trees of the Leisure and Cultural Services Department. Seven metres tall, with a crown spread of nine metres, this tree has been maintained in superb condition by the dedicated horticultural staff. Indeed, there are many mature trees on the grounds. Among those trees stands the giant Litchi chinensis.

The garden also features a kidney-shaped swimming pool and an outdoor fish pond.

=== Interior ===
- Ballroom – The Ballroom is used for hosting banquets for guests from home and abroad. It is also the venue for the Honours and Awards Presentation Ceremony and various community engagement activities.
- Dining Room – The Dining Room is used for banquets of smaller scale for guests from home and abroad.
- Drawing Room – The Drawing Room is used for receiving guests and holding meetings. Its walls and ceilings are embellished with exquisite plaster mouldings.

=== Gate Lodges and Government House Guards ===
At the front entrance on Upper Albert Road, there are two buildings with an iron gate known as the Gate Lodges. Built in 1855, they are the oldest structures of Government House. They were designed by Surveyor General Charles St George Cleverly who was in charge of the construction of the first generation of Government House in the 1850s. The lodges once housed the Government House Guards, who stood in front of the house and protected the Governor of Hong Kong. Various units of the British Army stationed in Hong Kong were used as guard units, which included:

- 1st Battalion of the Queen's Royal Surrey Regiment from 1962–63
- C Company of the 1st Battalion of the Duke of Edinburgh's Royal Regiment Berkshire and Wiltshire

Following the handover in 1997, the Hong Kong Police has taken up the guarding duties of the building.

== Open days ==
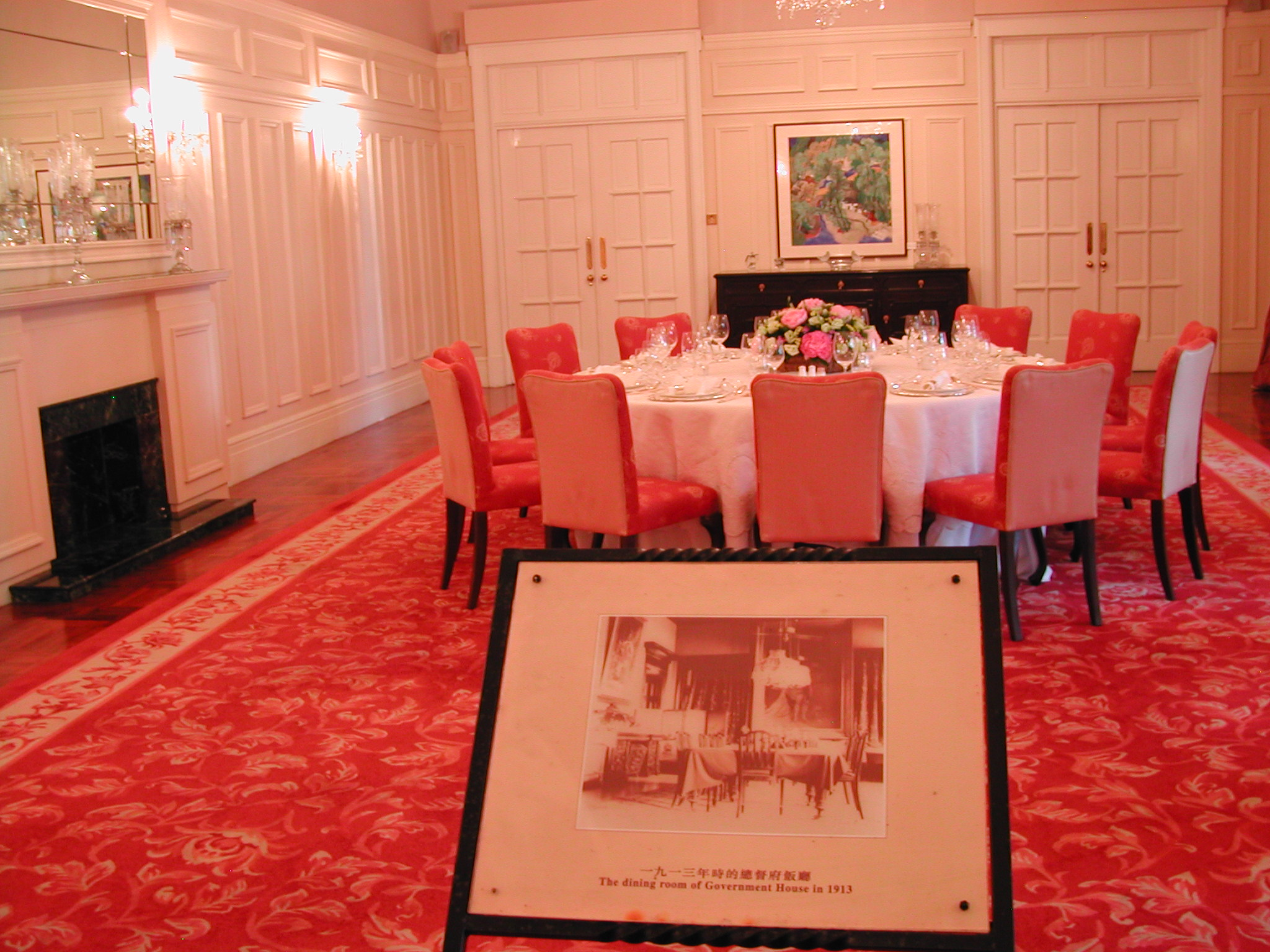
Dining room

The garden of Government House is opened twice a year to the public. At least one will be arranged in spring to enable members of the public to share the delight in viewing the full bloom of the azaleas. Visitors are usually allowed to pass by the drawing room, dining room and ballroom where key official functions are held.

The open days are generally arranged during weekends. Dates are announced through press releases one week in advance. No admission fee is charged.

== Booking ==
The ballroom of Government House was made available in the 1990s on three Fridays each month for bookings by charitable, non-profit or public organisations to host events that benefit the community. The nature of the event under application must be well-matched with the identity of Government House as an important historical monument of Hong Kong and with its status as a dignified location for the Hong Kong Government to hold official functions. In early 2006, the chief executive moved into the Government House and used it as their official residence and office. Most of the staff in the Chief Executive's Office were also relocated to the Government House to support the chief executive. Since then, the Government House was no longer available for booking due to security and operational reasons.

== Other official residences ==
In 1900, Mountain Lodge, on Victoria Peak, was built as an alternate summer home for the governor, a role it retained until 1934. The building survived until 1946, but today only the Gate Lodge and Victoria Peak Garden remain. One of three "GOVERNOR'S RESIDENCE" marking stones of the former Mountain Lodge was erected in the small flower bed in front of the entrance of the Government House in 1980.

From 1934, Fanling Lodge, in the New Territories, was used as a summer residence for the Governor. It has retained this role, and is now the alternative residence of the Chief Executive of Hong Kong. The Lodge is occupied mainly at weekends and on holidays.

== Feng shui ==
According to The New York Times, alleged bad feng shui was the reason Tung Chee Hwa refused to live or work in Government House upon becoming Chief Executive.

The Standard believed Tung's reason to stay away from the mansion was political: a subtle effort to reduce the age-old British legacy over Hong Kong. Other sources mention that "it was the warning about spying devices [installed throughout Government House] that scared him away".

== Staff ==
There are 20 housekeeping positions at the Government House. The senior chef to the is paid around HK$30,000 per month.

== See also ==
- Government House
- Government Houses of the British Empire
- Governor of Hong Kong
- History of Hong Kong
- List of buildings and structures in Hong Kong
- List of official residences

Preceded by ? (Caine Road 1846-?)	Home of the Legislative Council of Hong Kong; 1855–1930s	Succeeded by Old Central Government Offices
