= History of Victoria Peak =

Hong Kong's Peak District was originally named the "Hill District". It included Mount Austin (with Victoria Peak), Mount Gough, Mount Kellett and the area around Magazine Gap. Many homes were for summer use only, to escape the heat of Central, and were referred to as "bungalows". Over time, they were given names, especially when the bungalows were rebuilt in brick or stone as substantial mansions, allowing them to better withstand the damage from typhoons.

The accessible land on the Peak was first divided by the colonial government into plots called Farm Lots (FL). Later, Rural Building Lots (RBL) were introduced. All lots were numbered in the order they were made available to the public.

== 1860s - the earliest days ==
In 1860 Governor Robinson, age 35, had a path cut wide enough for sedan chairs starting at what is now Robinson Road, just above the Botanical Gardens, then climbing to Victoria Gap (today called Old Peak Road) and on to the top of Victoria Peak (today called Mount Austin Road). At the time, the hillside was bare rock.

The Signal Station at the top of Victoria Peak, for the signalmen, was the very first house on the Peak. In 1860, a path was also laid from Victoria Gap down to Pok Fu Lam Village in 1863.

A small Military Hospital called the Sanatorium was built 1860 as an experiment, on a flat area below the signal station and facing toward Mt. Kellett. Unfortunately, the higher elevation did not help the 17 patients recover any faster than elsewhere in Hong Kong, and so the Sanatorium was abandoned. Then, Granville and Matilda Sharp (after whom Matilda International Hospital is named), lived there in the summers of 1866 and 1867, until, as she wrote, "the Governor wanted it". Governor MacDonnell did want it. The Sharps were turfed out and the Sanatorium purchased from the Military. The first Mountain Lodge was built in about 1867, as the summer residence of the Governor.

Police Station No. 6 was built at Victoria Gap, in 1869, two years later, just across the road from what is now the "Peak Lookout" restaurant.

== 1870 - 1886 ==
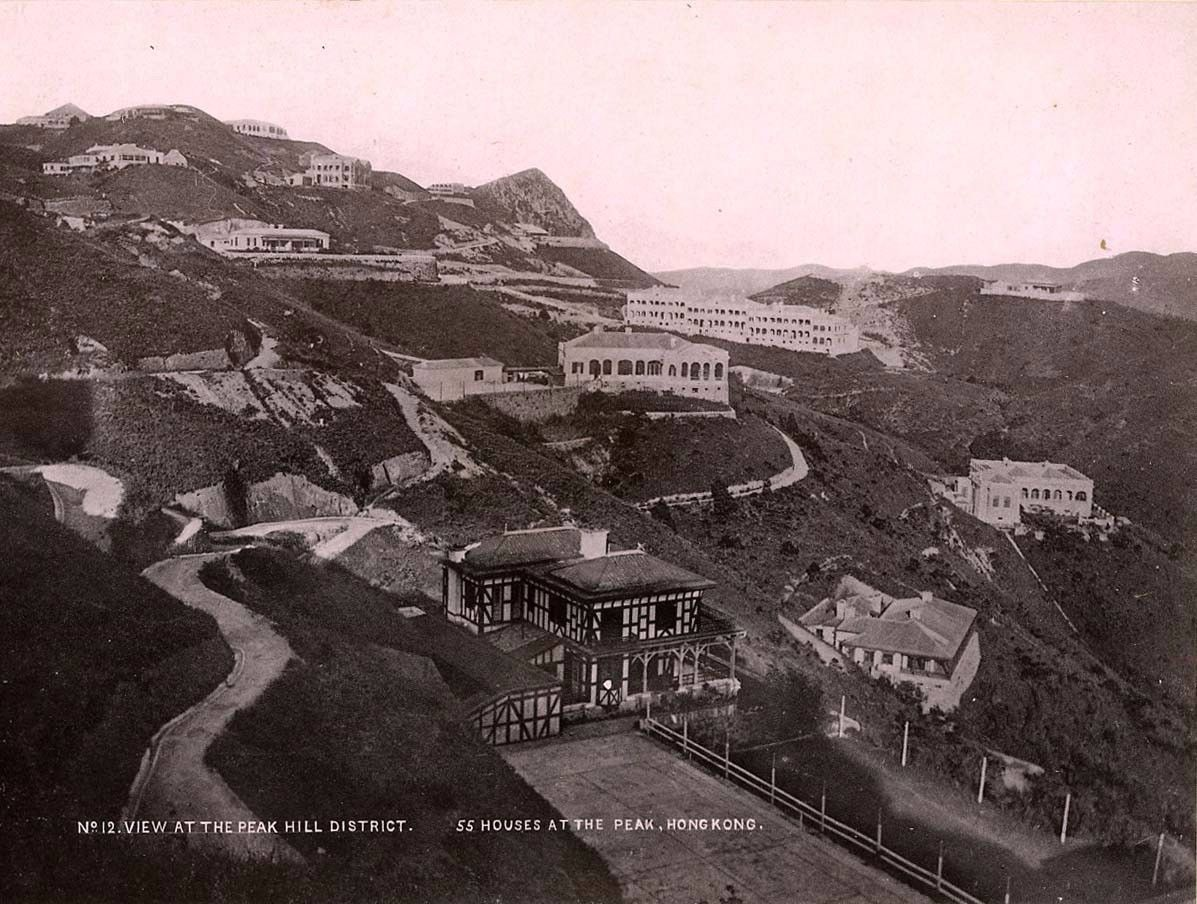
55 houses at the Peak by Lai Afong, c1880s

In 1874, more sedan chair paths and wells were provided, and this created a building boom.

- [FL 53] Dunheved: In 1874, the site right at Victoria Gap (to become the site of Peak Hotel), was purchased by N.J. Ede. In 1875, Henry Davis bought a lot and, Robert Gervase Alford, son of the Bishop of Victoria also applied for a lot on the Peak.
- [FL 54] Austin Arms: John Gardiner Austin, Colonial Secretary of Hong Kong, chose a spot above Victoria Gap, facing Mt. Kellett. His friends, who came to visit, called it the Austin Arms. In January 1875, Austin sent a request on behalf of nine Justices of the Peace, whose spokesman was acting Chief Justice of the Supreme Court, Mr. Justice James Russell, requesting that the land be sold to them, without the usual auction. He was roundly rebuked in an indignant reply reminding these justices, in no uncertain terms, that the duty of Government was to obtain the highest possible price for the land. Austin left Hong Kong in 1878, and James Russell moved into the Austin Arms.
- [FL 55 & 56]: Both in Wong Nai Chung.
- [FL 57] The Eyrie: In late 1875 Charles May, the first head of the Hong Kong Police, Fire Brigade and Goal (retired) applied for a lot at the very top of Mt. Austin and his bungalow was finished two years later in 1877. He chose the spot right at the top opposite a spot that had been leveled by Baron von Overbeck with views both toward the harbour and Mt. Kellett. However, he died just four years later in 1879. We do not know if it had a name then, but later it was called The Eyrie. The Eyrie was the highest home on the Peak. Chairman of the Hongkong & Shanghai Bank, E.R. Belilios, an Indian-born Jew and former holder of a monopoly licence to trade in opium purchased, in 1886, the bungalow built by Charles May in 1877 and then built a grand brick building, the "Eyrie". The house and front garden faced toward Pok Fu Lam, the back garden straddled the ridgeline facing the harbour. A small open-air pavilion on the top of an adjacent hill had a 360-degree view.
- [FL 58]: Located above Ede's property at the Gap - and he bought it after first trying unsuccessfully to expand his land that direction. Originally owned by Murray Forbes.
- [FL 59] The Homestead: Granville Sharp on Mt. Kellett was purchased in 1876. The Sharps lived there for 25 years. Homestead Road on Mt. Kellett is named after the house.
- [FL 60 & 61] The Haystack: Owned by Mr. Anton, and the house on the property still has the same name today. It now serves as the official residence of the Consul-General of Japan in Hong Kong.
- [FL 62] Treverbyn: also bought by Mr. Ede (became Peak Mansions in the 1929)
- [FL 63] Admiralty Bungalow: above Victoria Gap
- [FL 64] Rockyda: on Mt. Kellett - 1884 Mr. Ackroyd (became RBL 53 - Des Voeux Villas - 1888 James Orange)
- [FL 65] Myrtle Bank: on Mt. Kellett (became RBL 65)
- [FL 65] on Caine Rd.
- [FL 67] Cronest: Dr. Manson - on the ridge of Mt. Gough - (became RBL 60, and the houses of Mountain View)
- [FL 68]
- [FL 69] Belvedere: 1882 Dr. Adams
- [RBL 1]
  - Brockhurst: Henry Lardner Dennys;
  - Kirkendoa: Henry Lardner Dennys - 1897-8;
  - Hilden: A. Bryer 1912;
  - The Bracket: Alfred Bryer - 1914-15
- [RBL 2]
  - Fung Shui: E. Bowdler Assistant Surveyor General
  - Abergeldie: 1891-2
- [RBL 3] combined with RBL 2
- [RBL 4] The Cliff: Dr. Adams (combined with FL 69 in 1882 to make RBL 27 by)
- [RBL 5] Craigieburn
- [RBL 6]
  - Hillside
  - Clavadel: Clement Palmer - 1893
  - Haytor
  - Strawberry Hill: with part on RBL 8
- [RBL 7] Cloudlands
- [RBL 8]
  - Creggan
  - Strawberry Hill (with part on RBL 6)
- [RBL 9] The Sheiling (became Stewart Terrace)
- [RBL 10] The Mount 1883 - Mr. Johnson
- [RBL 11] Craig Ryrie P. Ryrie
- [RBL 12]
- [RBL 13]
- [RBL 14] Bushy Cottage (became Red Hill)
- [RBL 15] Stokes Bungalow
- [RBL 16]
  - Kellett Bungalow,
  - Kellett Spur, and
  - Oeonora became Matilda Hospital
- [RBL 17]
- [RBL 18]
- [RBL 19] Leigh Tor Robert Kenaway Leigh, 1885-86 (now Chief Justice's house)
- [RBL 20] Dunottar
- [RBL 21] La Hacienda
- [RBL 22]
- [RBL 23] Peak Church
- [RBL 24]
- [RBL 25] The Bluff
- [RBL 26] C.M.S. Sanitorium
- [RBL 27] The Cliff
- [RBL 28] The Falls
- [RBL 29] Bangour
- [RBL 30] (combined with RBL 31)
- [RBL 31] Dunford & The Chalet

Others built. So many, in fact, that there were enough people disinclined to make the trek down the hill and up again a Sunday to the Cathedral, that a wee Anglican chapel of ease, The Peak Church, was built in 1883. It was nicknamed the "Jelly Mould".

With the growth of the district, the Police built a new station on Gough Hill (the same site it is on today).

== 1888 - Peak Tram Opened ==
Once the Peak Tram opened, the Peak stopped being only a place for a summer home, it was now easy to live there year-round. Two hotels opened - the Peak Hotel and the Mount Austin Hotel. This is when the Peak began to be the residence of choice for many non-Chinese. All Chinese people were restricted from living on the Peak by the Peak District Reservation Ordinance 1904 which was repealed in 1930. Since the late 1900s, the Peak has become the residence of choice for many wealthy and powerful figures in the city.

== See also ==
- Victoria, Hong Kong
- Peak Reservation Ordinance
