= Peak District Reservation Ordinance 1904 =

Legislation of Hong Kong

Legislative Council of Hong Kong
- Long title: An ordinance for the reservation of a Residential Area in the Peak-District.
- Enacted by: Legislative Council
- Assented to: 29 April 1904
- Signed by: Francis Henry May, Acting Governor
- Signed: 29 April 1904
- Commenced: 15 July 1904
- Repealed: 5 December 1930

Legislative history
- Introduced by: Sir H. S. Berkeley, Attorney-General
- First reading: 28 March 1904
- Second reading: 19 April 1904
- Third reading: 26 April 1904

Repealed by
- Law Revision Ordinance 1930
- Status: Repealed

Peak District Reservation Ordinance 1904
- Traditional Chinese: 山頂區保留條例
Transcriptions
Yue: Cantonese
- Yale Romanization: Sāan déng kēui bóu làuh tìuh laih
- Jyutping: Saan^{1} deng^{2} keoi^{1} bou^{2} lau^{4} tiu^{4} lai^{6}

The Peak District Reservation Ordinance 1904, originally enacted as the Hill District Reservation Ordinance, is commonly called the Peak Reservation Ordinance and was a zoning law that reserved most of the Victoria Peak as a place of residence to non-Chinese people except with the consent of the Governor-in-Council. The law was in force from 1904 to 1930 where the deadly Third Pandemic of Bubonic plague took place in China, causing 100,000 deaths, and enormous numbers of Chinese people migrated into Hong Kong, causing the 1894 Hong Kong plague. Contemporary historians’ views toward the Ordinance vary, with some attributing the Ordinance to health segregation, whereas others attribute it to social status segregation. The debate on the second reading of the Bill is recorded in the Hong Kong Hansard, which shows that the two Chinese members, Ho Kai and Wei Yuk, did not oppose the Bill but a minority of the "leading Chinese" in the community were against it.

== Background ==
=== 1894 Hong Kong plague ===
In 1894, the deadly Third Pandemic of Bubonic plague spread from China to Hong Kong, causing 100,000 deaths in Canton alone within two months and subsequently the 1894 Hong Kong plague. Dr. Gomes da Silva, the Principal Medical Officer of Macao, in recording the sanitary condition of the Chinese population, observed that they usually threw house refuse into the street, where it accumulated until such time as the torrential summer rains and the overflow of the Pearl River cleared it away. A study by City University of Hong Kong also attributes the spread of plague to the hygiene and sanitary condition among local population at the time. Governor of Hong Kong Sir William Robinson reported to the British Government that "the filthy habits of life amongst the 210,000 Chinese who reside here have rendered Hong Kong liable to the invasion and development of the germ of the bubonic plague".

In the late 1890s, Europeans who resided in the City of Victoria gradually moved to places of higher altitude to evade such living conditions. But as the ethnic Chinese population continued to increase in the city, and the Europeans were reaching Victoria Peak thus could not move any higher, the Hong Kong Government decided to reserve the Peak for Europeans and other non-Chinese. In the 1904 Government Gazette explained that such reservation of the district was to address such concerns over the health of European people. Between 1894 and 1929, the plague caused 24,000 case of infection in Hong Kong, of which 90% were fatal. In 1929, the plague was eradicated and the law was repealed in 1930 by the Law Revision Ordinance 1930.

=== Segregation by social status ===
20th century Journalist Trea Wiltshire, in her book "Old Hong Kong", believes the Hill District Reservation Ordinance was a law based on social segregation as its goal. At the time one's social status was measured by the altitude of one's residence. One incidental benefit that came with the law included the reservation of the Peak Tram at certain hours of the day. From 8 to 10 am, the tram service was for top officials, first class passengers only, thus guaranteed good commute time. The front seat of the tram was always reserved for the governor, who further accorded its desirable social status by building a summer retreat, the Mountain Lodge. The Peak at the time was referred to by the British as "Little England". Many of the upper-middle class household members would have a dozen to 20 Chinese servants.

== Extent ==
According to the ordinance, the Peak District means "all that area in the Island of Hongkong situated above the 788 feet contour and to the west of a line drawn in a north and south direction through Middle or Cemetery Gap, including the hills known as Mount Cameron, Mount Gough, Mount Kellett and Victoria Peak".

== Similar ordinances ==
Other historical racially based zoning law in Hong Kong.

- Light and Pass Ordinance, 1888, repealed in 1895
  - The law exclusively required Chinese residents to carry a lamp when passing at night. The law was believed originally established under the assumption that all Chinese residents of the colony were potential criminals.
- Peak District (Residence) Ordinance, 1918, repealed in 1946
- Cheung Chau (Residence) Ordinance, 1919 repealed in 1946

Other historical zoning laws in Hong Kong.

- European District Reservation Ordinance, 1888 (April 1888)
  - It applied to parts of the City of Victoria that already had European-style single-family detached houses. The Ordinance was classified as a town planning and rent control law under Governor Des Vœux's administration. It required buildings in certain areas of Hong Kong to comply with the single-family detached home model, rather than the native, extremely crowded, Chinese model that land owners usually offered, which maximised profits. There was no exclusion by race, only by the type of buildings that could be built and a limit on the number of occupants.

== Exemption ==
The ordinance stated that "It shall be lawful for the Governor-in-Council to exempt any Chinese from the operation of this Ordinance on such terms as the Governor-in-Council shall think fit". Such exemptions were invoked for such personalities as First Lady of the Republic of China Soong Mei-ling and Eurasian millionaire Sir Robert Ho-Tung and his family who already had a retreat on the slopes of the Peak.

== See also ==
- First houses on the Peak
