= Sai Wan Estate =

Housing estate in Hong Kong

Coordinates: 22°16′52″N 114°07′31″E

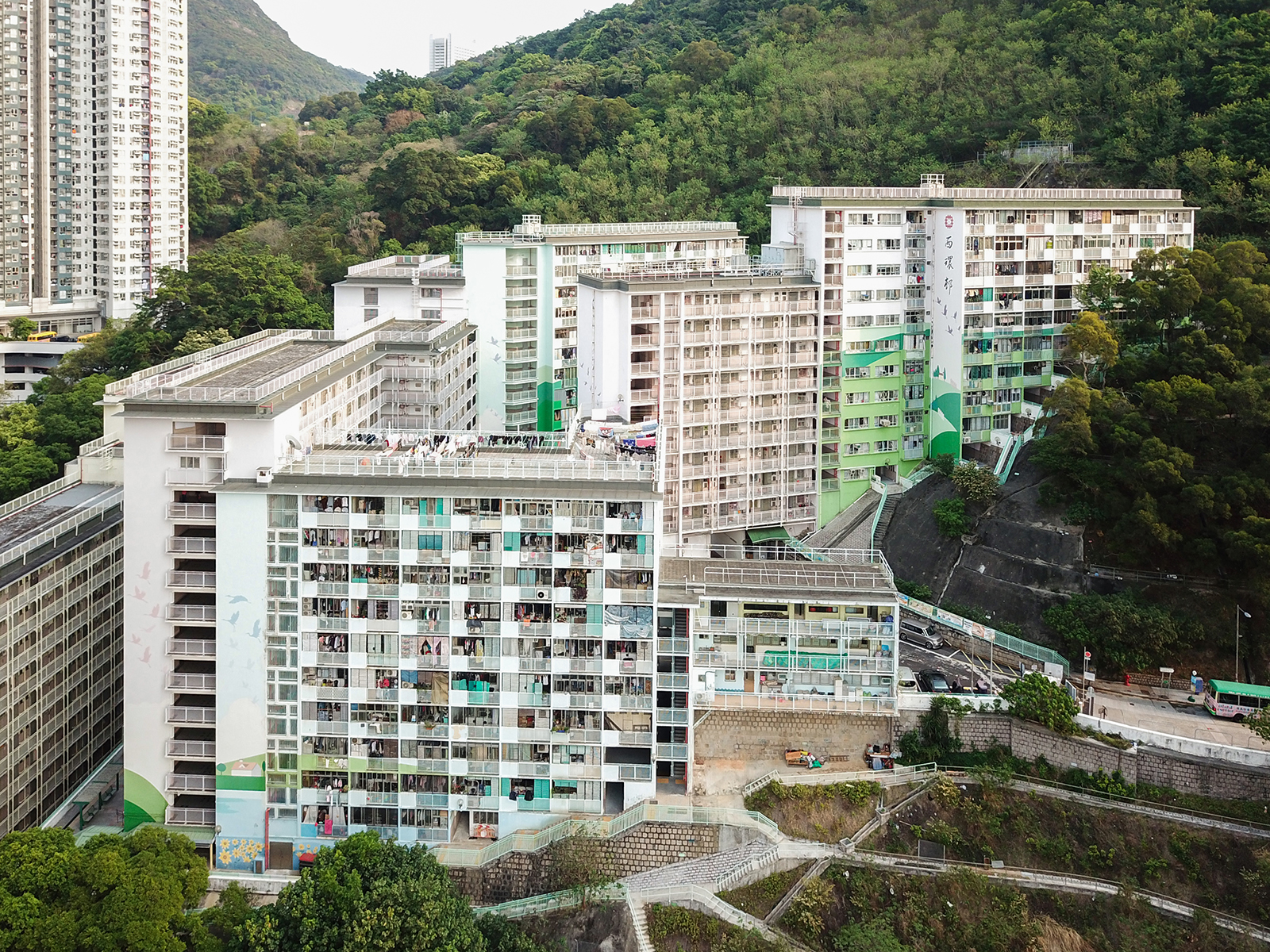
- Sai Wan Estate
- Interactive map of Sai Wan Estate

General information
- Location: Central and Western District, Hong Kong
- Status: Completed
- Category: Public Housing Estate
- Area: 382-606 ft²
- Population: 2,100
- No. of blocks: 5
- No. of units: 636

Construction
- Constructed: 1958; 68 years ago

Other information
- Governing body: Hong Kong Housing Authority

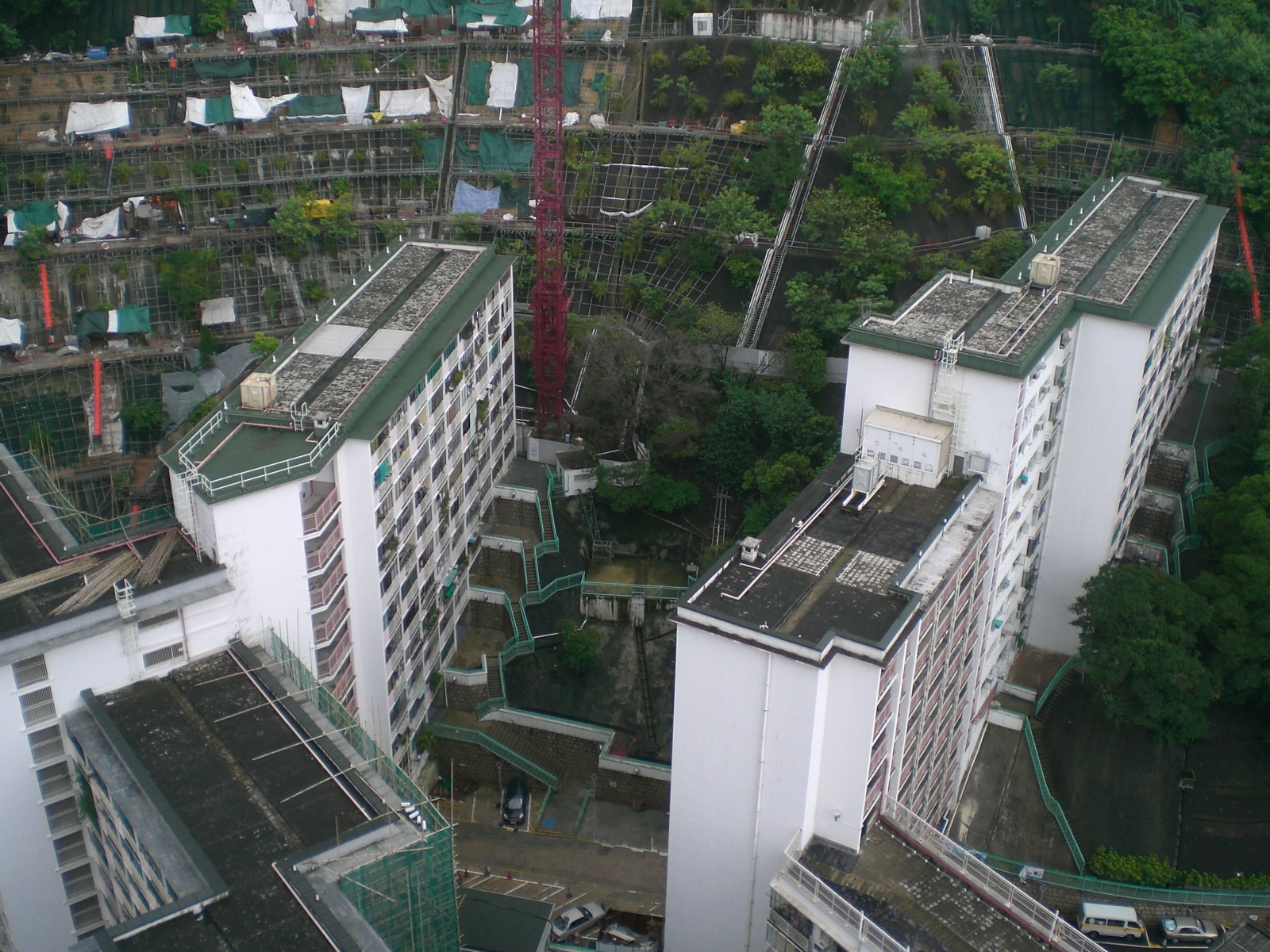
Sai Wan Estate bird's eye view

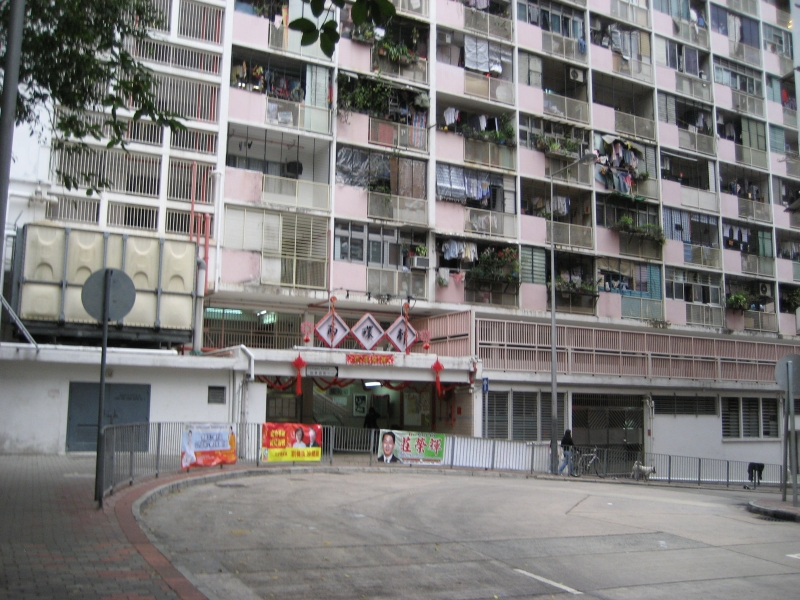
Sai Wan Estate front entrance

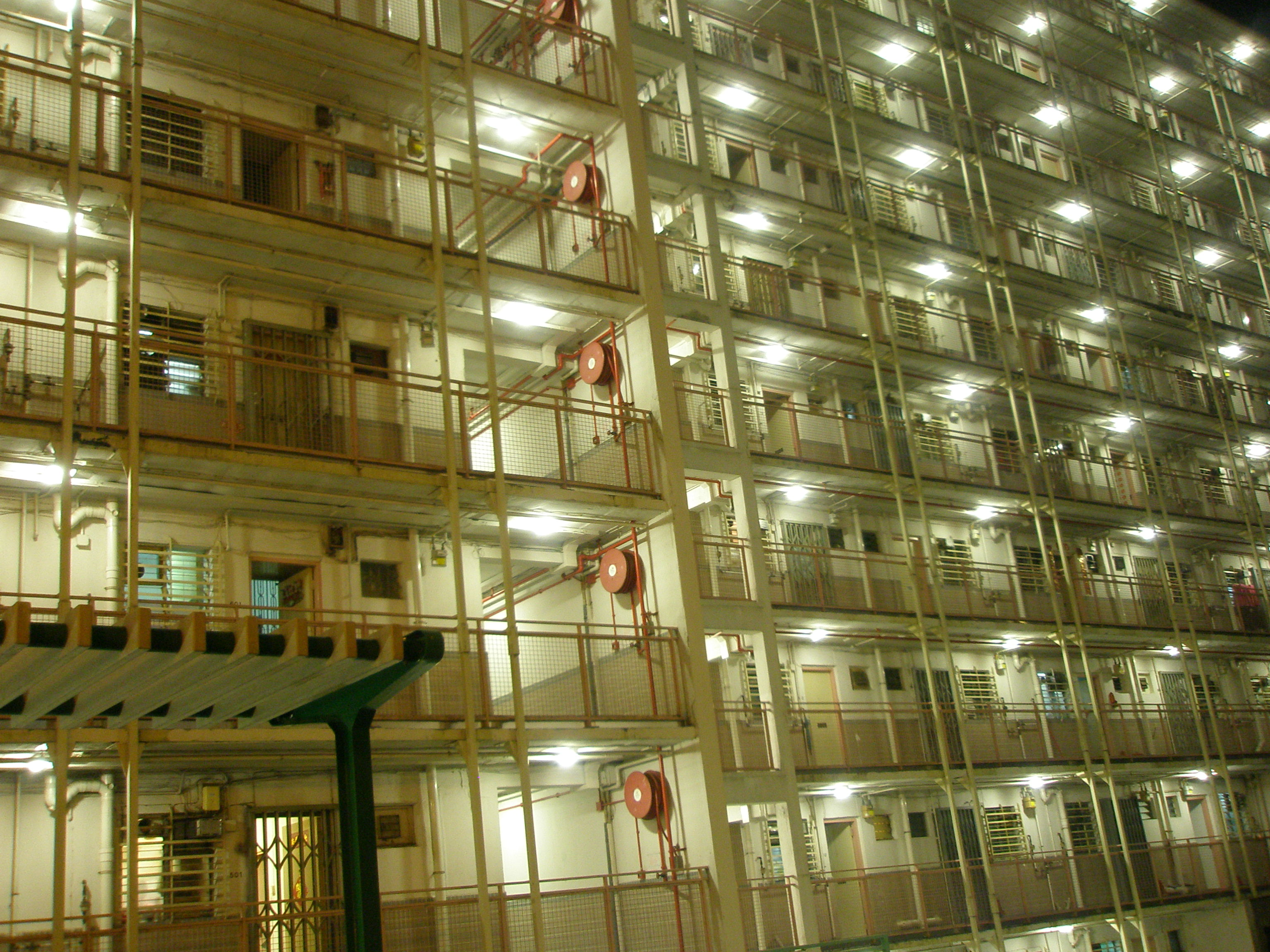
Sai Wan Estate by night

Sai Wan Estate (Chinese: 西環邨) is a public housing estate in Kennedy Town, Sai Wan, Hong Kong. Built in 1958 and 1959, it sits in a hillside that had to be extensively cut away for its construction. The estate comprises 636 flats in five linear blocks of 10 to 14 storeys. It is the only public housing estate in Central and Western District developed by the Hong Kong Housing Authority (HKHA) and it is the second-oldest existing public housing estate built by the Hong Kong Housing Authority, after Model Housing Estate.

Sai Wan Estate was designed by government architect Stanley Feltham.

Despite its age, in 2008 the Housing Authority decided not to redevelop the estate in the short term. Instead, repair works were planned to be carried out in the buildings to sustain the estate for the following 15 years.

Yet, Sai Wan Estate was brought up in the Policy Address 2021 in the reign of C.E. Carrie Lam, the HKHA was invited to conduct a study on the redevelopment potential together with another aging public housing estate, the Ma Tau Wai Estate in Kowloon East.

Subsequently, in February 2026, the time when Sai Wan Estate has aged 68 years, the joint meeting of the Commercial Properties Committee and the Subsidized Housing Committee of HKHA has approved and announced the rehousing and associated arrangements for the redevelopment of both Sai Wan Estate and Ma Tau Wai Estate (Phase 1). The target clearance date for Sai Wan Estate would be in September 2029, and the demolition works would be commenced afterwards.

== Houses ==
Name	Storey	Type	Completion
Central Terrace	14 (G/F - 10/F)	Old Slab	1958
East Terrace	13 (G/F - 13/F)	Old Slab	1958
North Terrace	10 (G/F - 10/F)	Old Slab	1958
South Terrace	12 (G/F - 12/F)	Old Slab	1958
West Terrace	14 (G/F - 14/F)	Old Slab	1958

== Politics ==
Sai Wan Estate is located in Kennedy Town & Mount Davis constituency of the Central and Western District Council. It was formerly represented by Cherry Wong Kin-ching, who was elected in the 2019 elections until June 2021.

== See also ==
- Kwun Lung Lau
- Public housing in Hong Kong
- List of public housing estates in Hong Kong
