= Gate Lodge =

Declared monument in Hong Kong

Coordinates: 22°16′28″N 114°08′45″E

- 舊總督山頂別墅守衛室
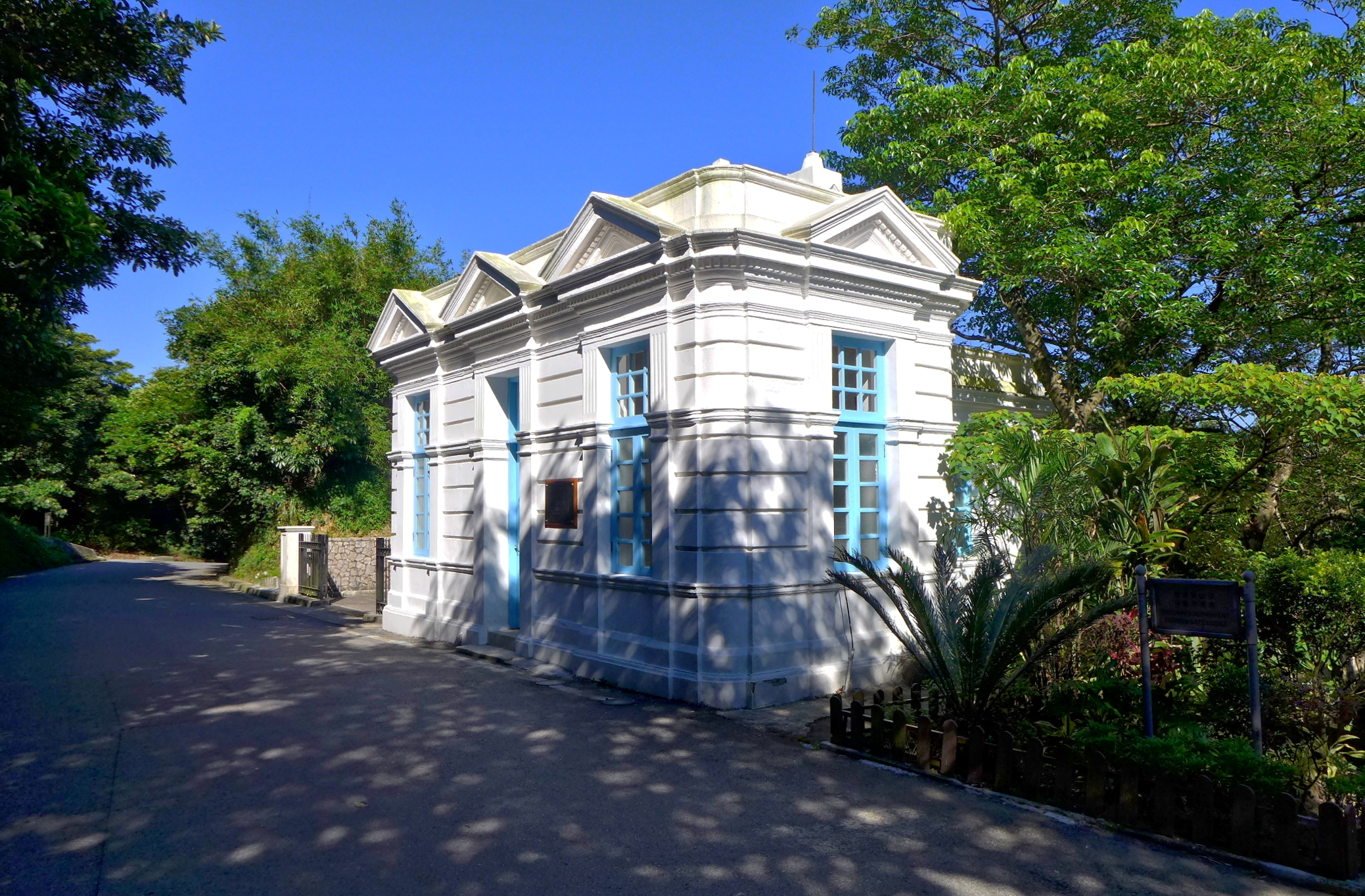
- Gate Lodge
- Interactive map of the Gate Lodge area

General information
- Architectural style: Renaissance
- Location: Victoria Peak, Mount Austin Road, Hong Kong
- Current tenants: Leisure and Cultural Services Department
- Groundbreaking: 1900
- Completed: 1902
- Owner: Hong Kong Government

Design and construction
- Designations: Declared monument

Gate Lodge
- Traditional Chinese: 舊總督山頂別墅守衛室
- Simplified Chinese: 旧总督山顶别墅守卫室
Transcriptions
Standard Mandarin
- Hanyu Pinyin: Jiù Zǒngdū Shāndǐng Biéshù Shǒuwèi Shì
Yue: Cantonese
- Yale Romanization: Gauh júng dūk sāan déng biht séuih sáu waih sāt
- Jyutping: Gau6 zung2 duk1 saan1 deng2 bit6 soei5 sau2 wai6 sat1

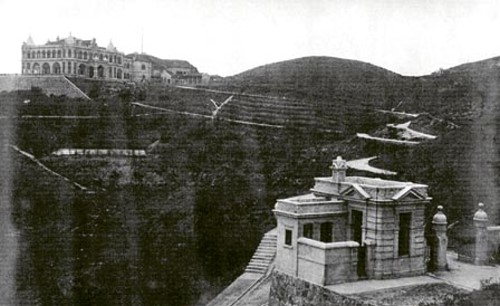
Historical image of the Gate Lodge, with the former Mountain Lodge in the background.

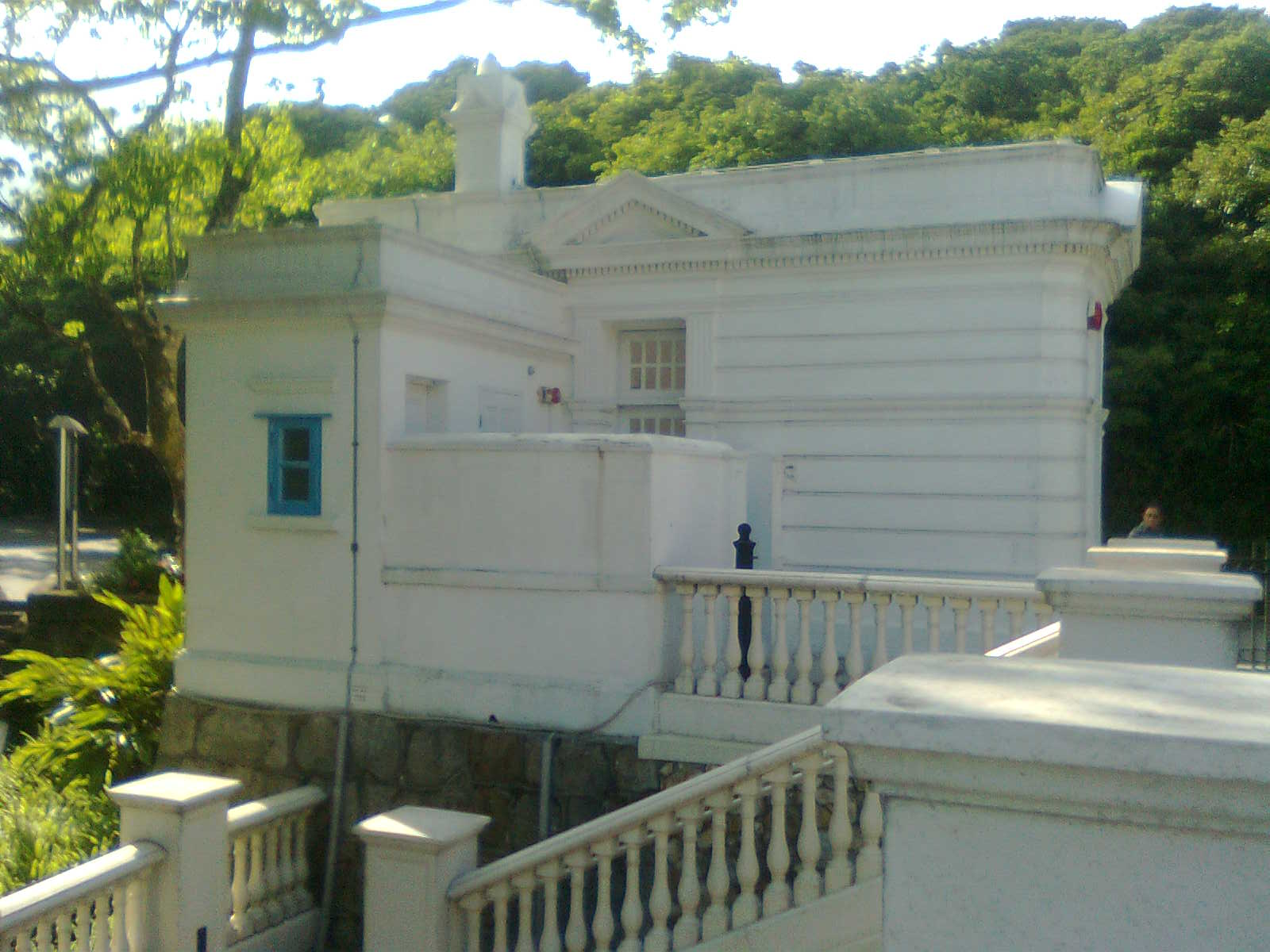
The back of the building

Gate Lodge is a small house located at Mount Austin Road on Victoria Peak, Hong Kong Island, Hong Kong. Gate Lodge was built between 1900 and 1902 and was one of two gate houses in the former complex known as Mountain Lodge, home to the then Governor of Hong Kong. The Gate Lodge originally served as living quarters for the keeper of Mountain Lodge. However, the main building was demolished in 1946. The Gate Lodge remains, but no longer used as an official residence. It was declared as a monument in 1995 and it is now preserved in Victoria Peak Garden and used as a site office of the Leisure and Cultural Services Department.

Designed to resemble a Scottish mansion, it is designed in the Renaissance style. The Mount Austin Road façade has rounded corners and triangular friezes.

== Future development ==
To put the building to meaningful use and leverage its historical legacy, Senior Government Architect Raymond Fung said it will be used as a public gallery.

"What we are going to do is to open this gate door, so that you can enter this 100 square feet (9.3 m^{2}) space inside where we will put pictures and descriptions about the history of Victoria City and also Hong Kong in general, therefore giving information of our history to visitors."
