= Stanley Feltham =

Terence Stanley Crathern Feltham (1896–1971) was Chief Architect in the Public Works Department of Hong Kong.

He designed many public buildings in Hong Kong, including:

- He was the project architect for Fanling Lodge, a summer residence for the then Governor of Hong Kong, which was built in 1934.
- He designed Sheung Li Uk Estate (上李屋邨), the first estate built by the Hong Kong Housing Society, completed in 1952. The estate was redeveloped in 1995 as Cronin Garden.
- He planned and designed Sai Wan Estate in Kennedy Town, which was completed in 1958.

In 1947, he was nominated correspondent with the Colonial Liaison Officer on housing issues.

He was one of the 27 founding members of the Hong Kong Institute of Architects in 1956.
