= Fanling Lodge =

Grade I official residence in Hong Kong

Coordinates: 22.4984°N 114.1167°E

- 港督粉嶺別墅
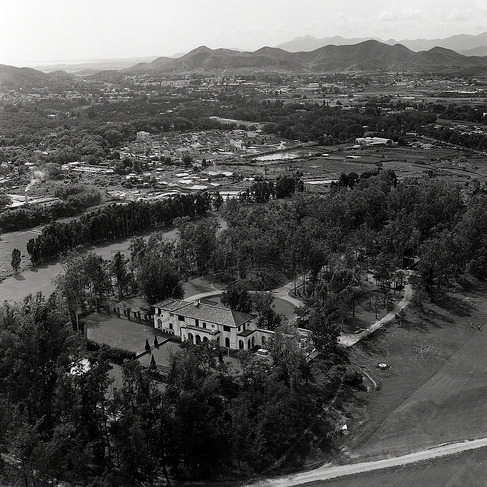
- Fanling Lodge in 1973
- Interactive map of the Fanling Lodge area

General information
- Location: Kam Tsin, Hong Kong
- Current tenants: Chief Executive
- Completed: 1934
- Cost: HK$140,000
- Owner: Hong Kong Government

Technical details
- Grounds: 2.3 hectares (0.023 km^{2})

Design and construction
- Architect: Stanley Feltham
- Designations: Grade I historic building

Fanling Lodge
- Traditional Chinese: 行政長官粉嶺別墅
- Simplified Chinese: 行政长官粉岭别墅
Transcriptions
Standard Mandarin
- Hanyu Pinyin: Xíngzhèngzhǎngguān Fěnlǐng Biéshù
Yue: Cantonese
- Jyutping: hang4 zing3 zoeng2 gun1 fan2 leng5 bit6 seoi5

Alternative Chinese name
- Traditional Chinese: 港督粉嶺別墅
Transcriptions
Yue: Cantonese
- Yale Romanization: Góng dūk fán léhng biht séuih
- Jyutping: Gong2 duk1 fan2 leng5 bit6 seoi5

Fanling Lodge is an official residence of the Chief Executive of Hong Kong, which serves as a country house and occasionally hosts official functions. Built in 1934 as a summer residence for the then Governor of Hong Kong, Fanling Lodge was granted a Grade I historic building status in 2014, amid concerns about its inclusion within a new town development plan.

== Location ==
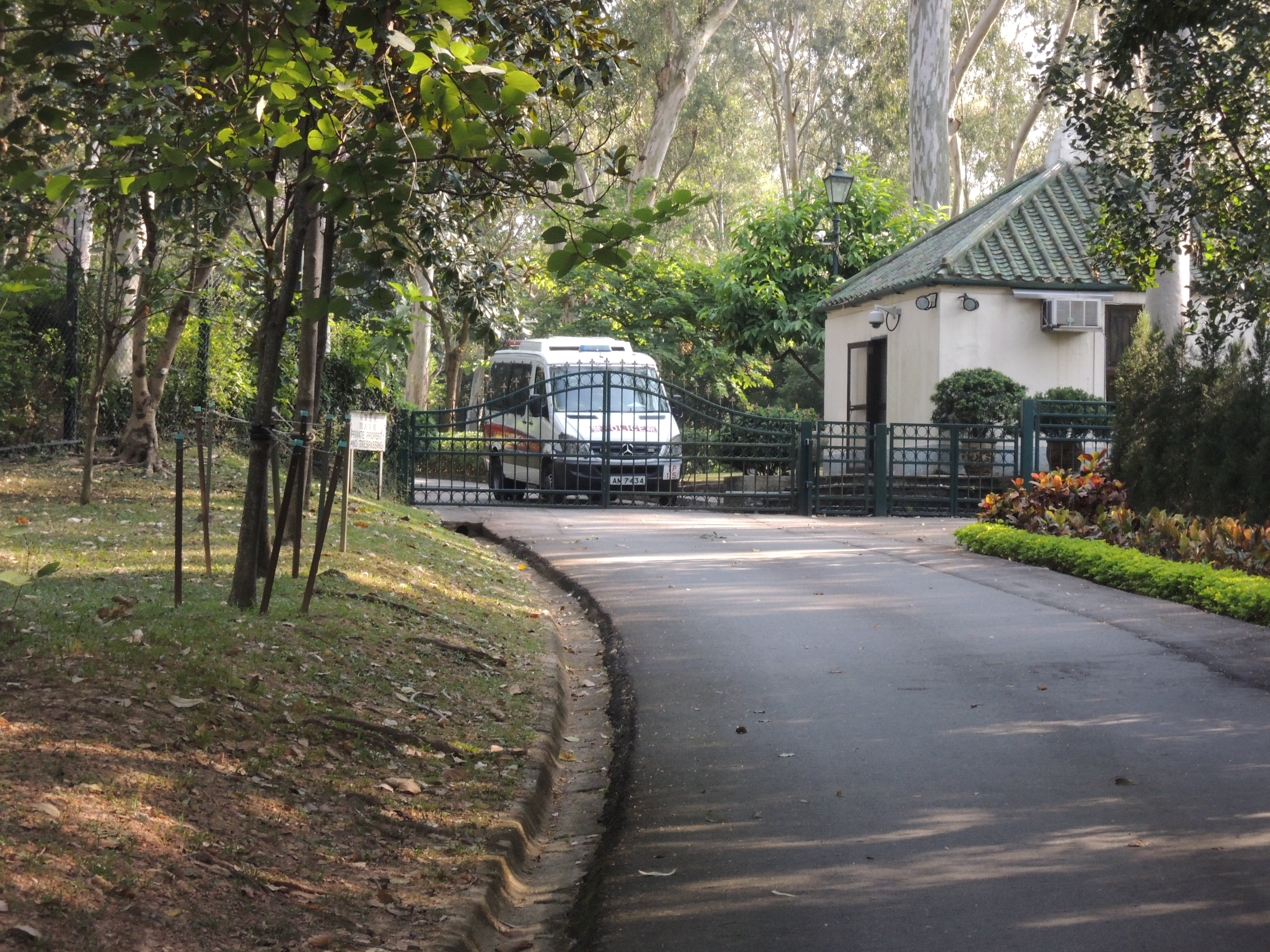
Access to Fanling Lodge from Hong Kong Golf Club

Fanling Lodge is located in the Kam Tsin area of the New Territories in Hong Kong, near Fanling and Kwu Tung. It is situated in a 2.3-hectare (5.7-acre) wooded lot within the grounds of Hong Kong Golf Club, off Castle Peak Road - Kwu Tung.

== Official residence ==
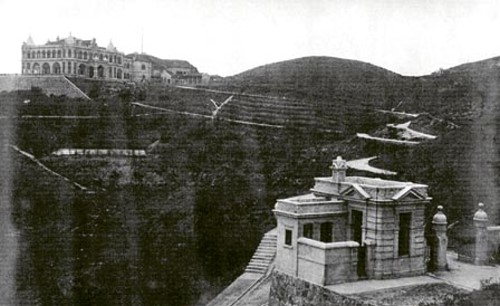
Mountain Lodge on Victoria Peak (pictured, left) was replaced by Fanling Lodge as the summer residence of the Governors of Hong Kong.

In 1932, citing the high expense for repairs and maintenance on Mountain Lodge, the summer residence of the Governor of Hong Kong on Victoria Peak, Governor Sir William Peel proposed constructing a new summer residence in Fanling. Completed in 1934, Fanling Lodge served as a weekend and holiday retreat for the Governors of Hong Kong. Mountain Lodge was eventually demolished in 1946. Fanling Lodge remained as an official government residence after the handover in 1997 and as of 2015 remains the alternate residence of the Chief Executive of Hong Kong.

A helicopter pad (WB16) is located on the lawn of the home and allows the Chief Executive to travel to the lodge from Government House, the main Hong Kong residence.

Tung Chee-hwa, the first Chief Executive of Hong Kong, was criticised by the Democratic Party at the end of 1997 for not using Fanling Lodge. Critics demanded that he consider giving up this government property. Since that time, the relevance of Fanling Lodge as an official residence has been questioned recurrently during Legislative Council debates. Opponents object that the provision of such a residence to the Chief Executive is an unnecessary perk, and that another use should be found for the building.

At the end of 1997, the combined upkeep cost of Fanling Lodge and Government House, both seldom used, was HK$13 million a year. About 58 domestic staff were employed to maintain the two official residences. It was reported in 2005, at the beginning of the tenure of Donald Tsang as Chief Executive, that two permanent staff were employed at Fanling Lodge. The maintenance cost incurred by the Architectural Services Department for the upkeep of the Lodge amounted to HK$856,000 for the 2010–2015 period.

== History ==
Fanling Lodge was designed in 1933 by government architect Stanley Feltham of the Public Works Department of Hong Kong. Its construction was completed in 1934 at a cost of HK$140,000. It was used as a summer residence of the Governor of Hong Kong until the Japanese occupation of Hong Kong during World War II. Governor Sir William Peel, who had proposed the construction of the lodge, had a keen interest in golf and horse riding, and he often made the Fanling Lodge available to the garden parties of the Fanling Hunt and Race Club, that was managing the nearby Kwanti Racecourse.

After the War, it was used as a provisional campus of the Rural Teachers' Training College (香港官立鄉村師範專科學校) between September 1946 and 1948. Later, being considered too close to the Chinese border in a Cold War context - the People's Republic of China was established in 1949, it was assigned to the British armed forces until 1960. It subsequently returned to its initial function as an alternate official residence. The Lodge has also hosted visiting dignitaries: famous guests have included Prince Charles in 1994 and British Prime Minister John Major in 1996.

In the years preceding the 1997 handover, Fanling Lodge served as a venue for secret discussions between China and the United Kingdom, outside of the Sino-British Joint Liaison Group. Such discussions covered for example new accounting arrangements for monetary control, the linked exchange rate system, the establishment of a monetary authority for Hong Kong which was eventually established in 1993, and issues arising from a Sino-British Memorandum of Understanding signed concerning the construction of a new airport, now the Chek Lap Kok Airport.

Minor building renovations were made in 2005.

== Architecture ==
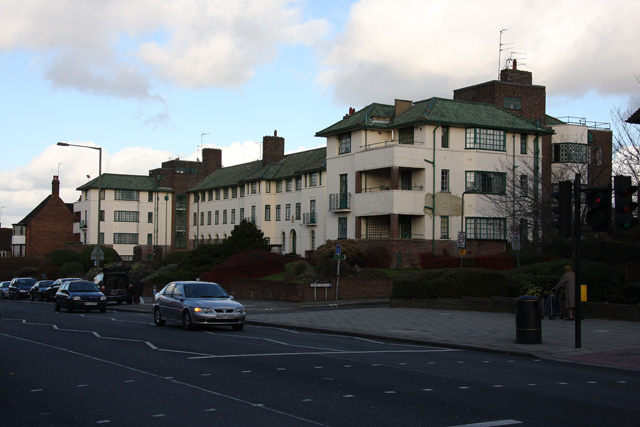
The architectural style of "The Pantiles" (pictured), a block of flats in Hampstead Garden Suburb of London, has been compared to the style of the main building of Fanling Lodge. Both buildings were completed in 1934.

The main building of Fanling Lodge is a two-storey bungalow. Its architectural style is an eclectic mixture, including Arts and Crafts, Spanish Mission Revival and "Hollywood Moderne" styles, together with classical elements such as Corinthian columns and Serlian arches. The building features verandas at the front and back and is topped by a pitched roof with pan-and-roll tiles. Local materials, such as glazed green screen blocks, were used in its construction.

The interior of the main building follows the minimalist style of the 1930s. All the rooms have panelled doors and brass fittings; the floors are boarded and varnished. Staircases are made of polished terrazzo. The upper floor comprises four bedrooms, a dressing room and bathrooms, while the lower floor includes a front hall, living room, dining room, study, kitchen and staff quarters.

Similarities have been noted between the architectural style of the main building and that of "The Pantiles", a block of flats built in Hampstead Garden Suburb of London in 1934 and designed by the British architect James Bertie Francis Cowper.

The property also features a swimming pool, a tennis court and a wood-and-stone pergola. Additional buildings include a guardhouse and a Chinese-style pavilion.

== Garden ==
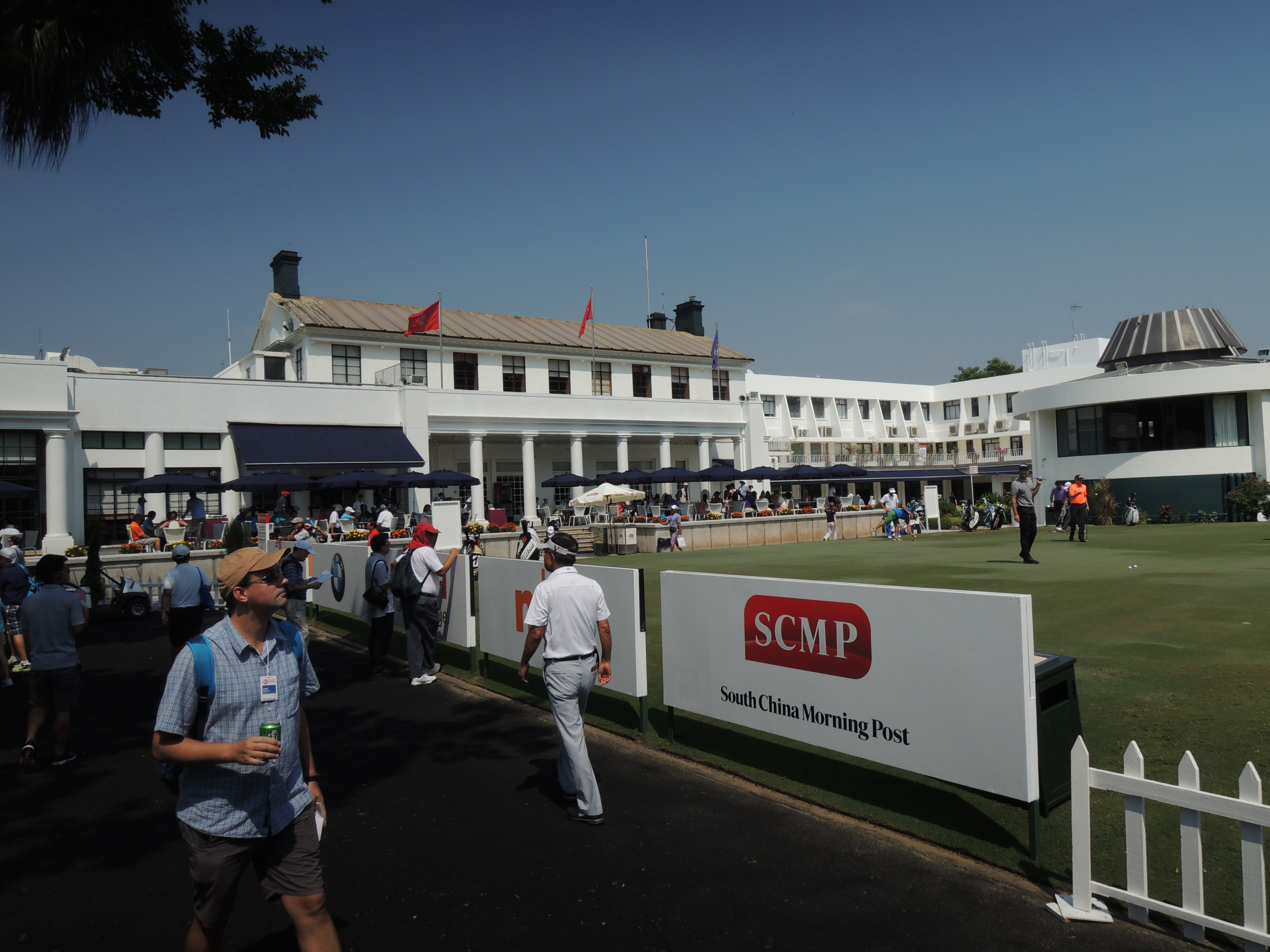
The nearby Fanling Clubhouse (pictured) of the Hong Kong Golf Club was granted a Grade II historic building status in September 2014, while Fanling Lodge was listed as a Grade I building.

The garden of the Lodge was designed in the Arts and Crafts style of the British landscape designer Gertrude Jekyll. It features woodland with tall trees, vistas and terraced lawns front and back. Tree species include Magnolia grandiflora, Melaleuca quinquenervia, Eucalyptus citriodora, Livistona chinensis and Bougainvillea spectabilis. These species are relatively common in Hong Kong. The retaining walls around the back garden are a mix of local grey bricks and masonry.

== Conservation ==
Concerns have been raised that Fanling Lodge and the nearby Hong Kong Golf Club Fanling Clubhouse, built in 1914, may be demolished for the development of a new town in the area. Secretary for Development Paul Chan Mo-po stated in July 2013 that the Lodge and the Golf Club might be replaced by a housing project. In this context, the Antiquities Advisory Board listed Fanling Lodge as a Grade I historic building and Fanling Clubhouse as a Grade II historic building in September 2014. Thus, the two historic buildings may be preserved and incorporated into future new town developments.
