= Peak Church =

Former church in Hong Kong

Coordinates: 22.265855°N 114.153566°E

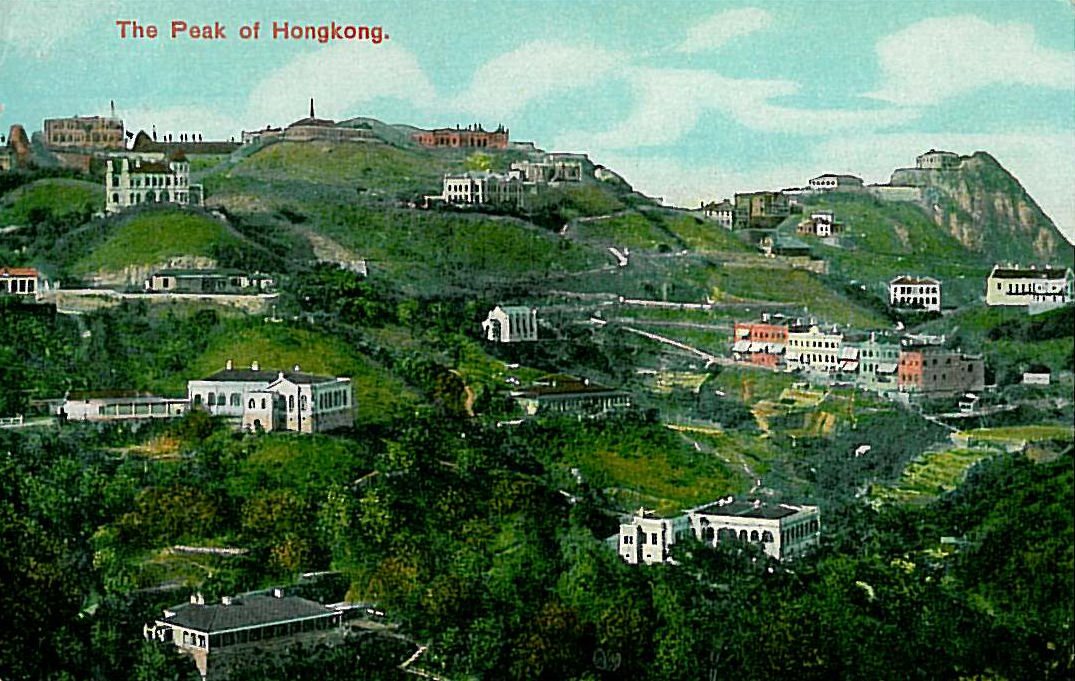
Postcard of The Peak c. 1900. The Peak Church is the building at the centre of the picture.

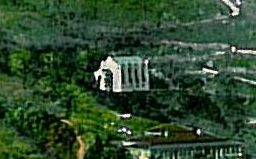
Detail of the postcard showing the Peak Church.

The Mt. Gough Peak Protestant Church, also called the Peak Church (or Peak Chapel) was a Protestant chapel of ease in the Peak District of Hong Kong Island and held its first service in June 1883. It was "... an unpretending structure in the similitude of a jelly mould ..." which explains its affectionate nickname The Jelly Mould.

Sunday Services were in the late afternoon (4:30 or 5:30 pm). The first three Sundays was a Church of England service, with a Presbyterian service on the fourth. 50 years later - in the 1930s, the only regular Anglican service was 7:30 on Thursday, but the church was regularly used by the Scandinavian Mission to Seamen.

The last service was held on Christmas Day, 1941 - the day Hong Kong was surrendered to the Japanese. The sermon was given by Rev. Charles Higgins. His wife, Mary Atkinson Tyng Higgins, may have been the woman who took the cross from the Peak Church to Stanley Internment Camp where it was used during services in camp during the war. The cross is still in use at St. Stephen's Chapel in Stanley.

Peak Church was destroyed by a shell during World War II and not rebuilt. Rev. Johan Nielsen, the Norwegian Seamen's Mission pastor who had been holding services there up until the Japanese attack, tells of finding the building "blown to bits," with nothing left but ninety hymnals. Its lease expired in 1958 and, lacking church endowments, parish and congregation, it was decided to return the land to the Government, give the cross to St. Stephen's College and the font to be used in another church. The location, Rural Building Lot 23, is now a public playground near the Peak Fire Station on Peak Road opposite Bluff Path (Chinese: 百祿徑). The records of the Peak Church are held by the Hong Kong Public Records Office.

== See also ==
- History of Victoria Peak
- Mount Gough
