= Charles St George Cleverly =

Hong Kong government official

Picture of Cleverly

Charles St. George Cleverley or Cleverly (Chinese: 基化厘 or 急庇利; 8 July 1819 – 14 August 1897) was the second Surveyor General in Hong Kong. He worked under the Colonial Secretary and was responsible for public infrastructure, town planning and land auction.

== Career ==
Cleverly is famous for the construction of Government House. The construction began in October 1851 and finished in October 1855.

His name was often registered in the Hong Kong Government Gazette in relation to the public auction of crown land and buildings.

== Family ==
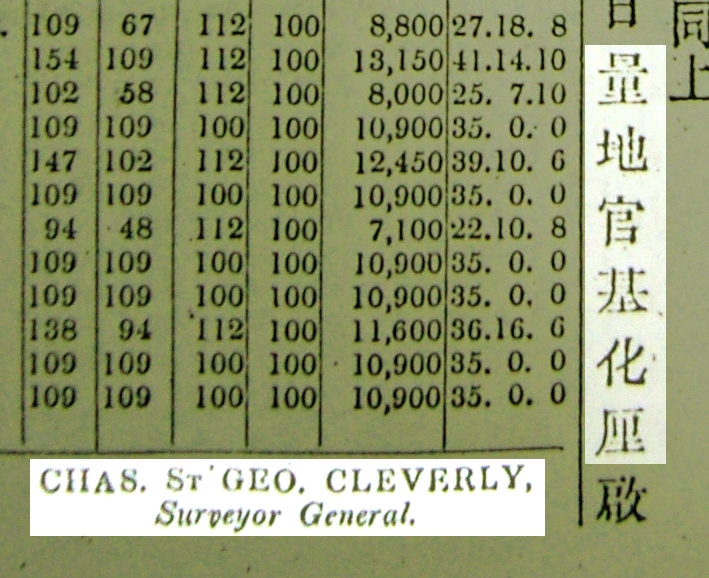
Cleverly and his names in Hong Kong Government Gazette

Cleverly was born in Bloomsbury, London, one of five sons of the physician Samuel Cleverley, doctor to the Duke of Kent and Duke of Cambridge. His grandfather William Cleverley owned a shipyard beside the River Thames in London. He built many large ships for the British East India Company.

He married Ah Gow Li (died 1847), with whom he had a daughter, Augusta Cleverly (1846–1930). He married secondly Mary Pope (1818–1875), with whom he had a son, Charles Frederick Moore Cleverly (1852–1921), who was the father of Sir Osmund Somers Cleverly, the Principal Private Secretary of Prime Ministers Stanley Baldwin, and Neville Chamberlain.

He died at his home in Great Malvern, Worcester.

== Memory ==
Cleverly Street in Sheung Wan, Hong Kong, is named after him.

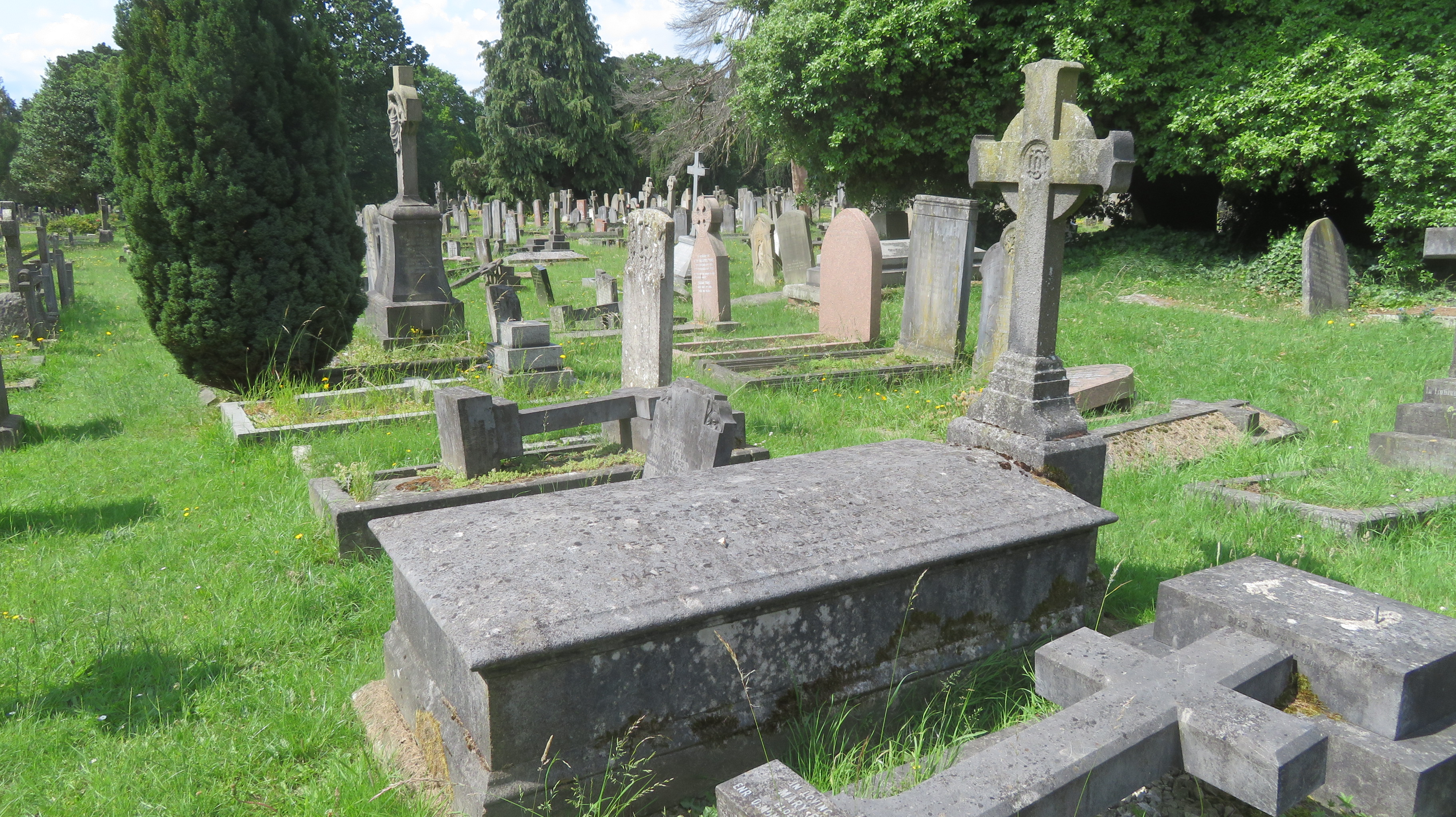
His grave in East Finchley Cemetery

Government offices
Preceded by A. T. Gordon	Surveyor General of Hong Kong; 1845–1865	Succeeded by Wilberforce Wilson
