= Matilda International Hospital =

- Independent
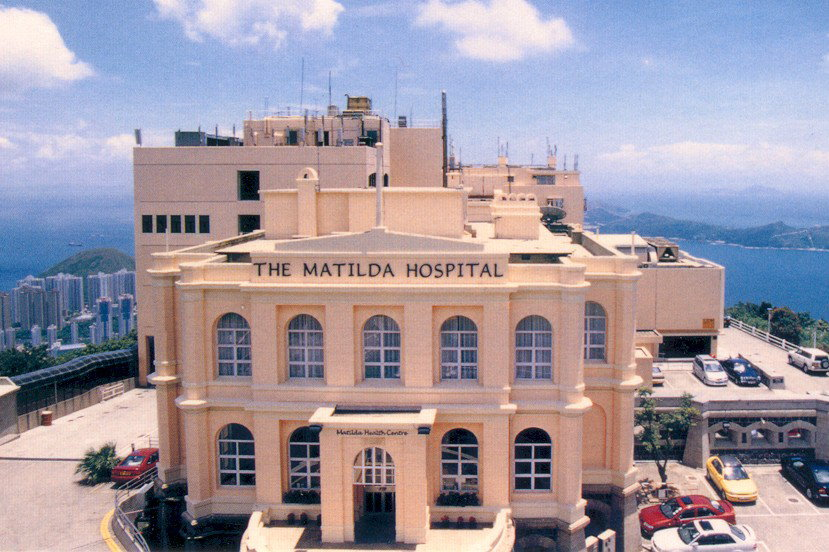

Geography
- Location: The Peak, Hong Kong Island, Hong Kong

Organisation
- Care system: Private, not-for-profit
- Type: General

History
- Founded: 1907

Links
- Website: https://www.matilda.org

Matilda International Hospital (MIH) is a nonprofit private hospital. Located at The Peak on Hong Kong Island in Hong Kong. The hospital was established in 1907.

Matilda International Hospital operates as an independent organization with no religious, commercial or academic affiliation. The hospital provides 24-hour outpatient care, surgical procedures, and specialist services in areas including Orthopaedics and spine, women's health and maternity, General surgery, health assessments, and ear, nose and throat (ENT). The hospital is known for its personalised and evidence-based patient care.

== History ==
Matilda Hospital was founded through a bequest from Granville Sharp, a banker from the well-known Sharp family of Romsey, Hampshire, United Kingdom. His wife, Matilda Lincolne Sharp, moved to Hong Kong with him in 1858, and died in 1893. Upon his own death in 1899, Sharp's will directed that a hospital be constructed in her name, dedicating it to his wife's kind and caring ways.

The hospital completed construction and admitted its first patients in 1907, at that time providing medical skills and the comforts of a nursing home free of charge for the poor. The maternity department was built connected to the main hospital and received the first babies in 1915.

Matilda Hospital was used as a military hospital towards the end of the 1940s. In 1951, Matilda Hospital merged with War Memorial Nursing Home and reopened. Statutorily known as the Matilda Memorial & War Hospital, the institution is now widely recognised as Matilda International Hospital. Today, it is a not-for-profit hospital serving Hong Kong and the wider region.

== Services and facilities ==
Matilda International Hospital provides a comprehensive range of medical services and specialties, focusing on personalized patient care. The hospital's key areas of expertise include maternity, Orthopaedics and spine, General surgery, and ear, nose and throat (ENT) services. The hospital offers 24-hour outpatient service, along with critical care, to handle medical emergencies at any time.

In addition to the main hospital on The Peak, Matilda operates an in-town medical centre in Central. This clinic provides a range of services, including health checks, antenatal care, general practitioners and specialist consultations, and minor procedures.

== Heritage and architecture ==
The original hospital building, a two-storey structure of granite and red brick, was designed to resemble a commodious royal hunting lodge. Although the main building was partially damaged during World War II, it remains in use today. Several buildings in the hospital complex are recognised for their historical significance by the Antiquities Advisory Board of Hong Kong.

- Grade II Historic Building: the main hospital building
- Grade III Historic Buildings: the old maternity block, Sharp House, and Granville House

Today, the hospital occupies a 1.40-hectare site, which includes land for the hospital and staff quarters.

== Accreditations ==
The hospital adopted the standards of the Australian Council on Healthcare Standards (ACHS), becoming fully ACHS accredited in December 2010. In 2023, Matilda was awarded ACHS accreditation with Outstanding Achievement, the first in the world to receive such accreditation.

== Charitable works ==
Matilda International Hospital has an affiliated charitable foundation, the Matilda Children's Foundation. The foundation funds and arranges life-saving surgery for children in need across Asia.

The hospital also supports the community by offering subsidised or free health checks.

== See also ==
- List of hospitals in Hong Kong
- Health in Hong Kong
- Healthcare in Hong Kong
- Royal Naval Hospital (Hong Kong)
- First houses on the Peak
