= Cleverly estate =

Housing estate in Shepherd's Bush, London, England

Coordinates: 51.509°N 0.242°W

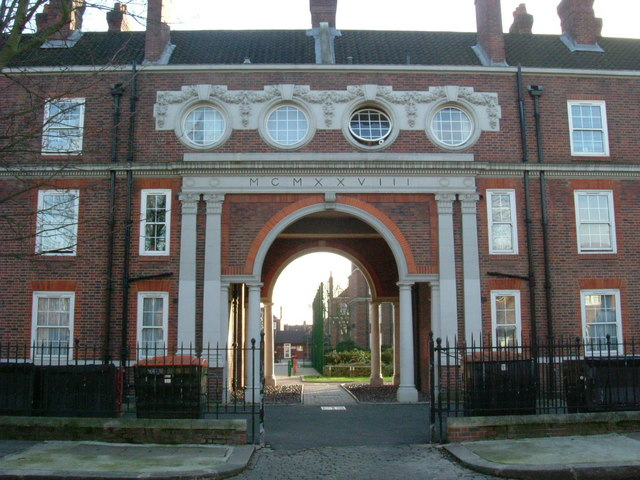
An entrance to the estate

The Cleverly estate is a Peabody Trust housing estate in Shepherd's Bush, London, completed in 1928, and designed by Victor Wilkins. It was the first Peabody estate built with a bathroom in every flat, and has "the most elaborate exterior features" of any of their pre-war estates.

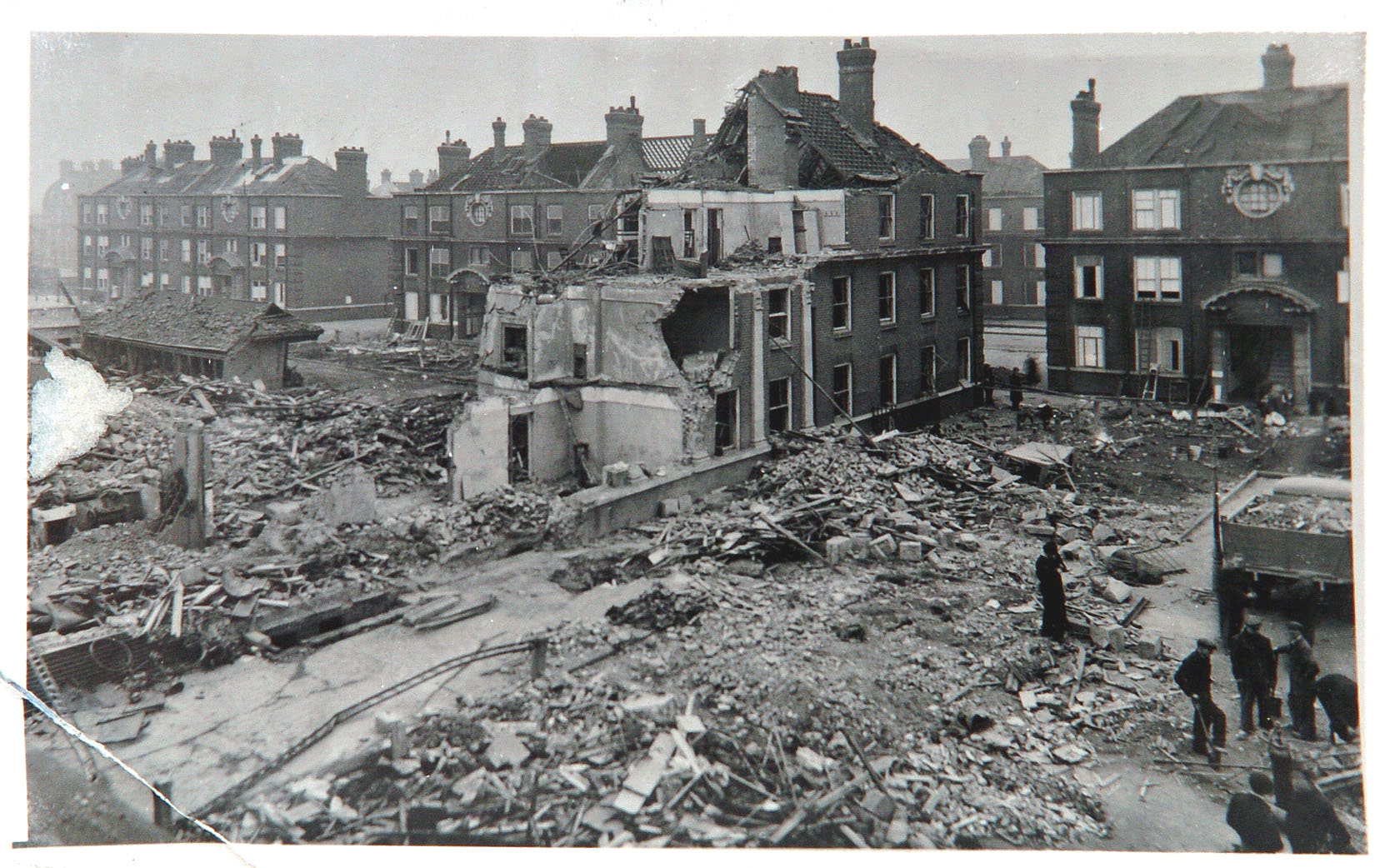
Bomb damage after a direct hit from a V1 rocket in 1945

On 14 February 1945, 30 residents were killed when the estate was struck by a V1 rocket.
