= Mountain Lodge =

Hong Kong Governor summer residence

Coordinates: 22.274132°N 114.143354°E

- Traditional Chinese: 香港總督山頂別墅
Transcriptions
Yue: Cantonese
- Yale Romanization: Hēung góng júng dūk sāan déng biht séuih
- Jyutping: Hoeng1 gong2 zung2 duk1 saan1 deng2 bit6 soei5

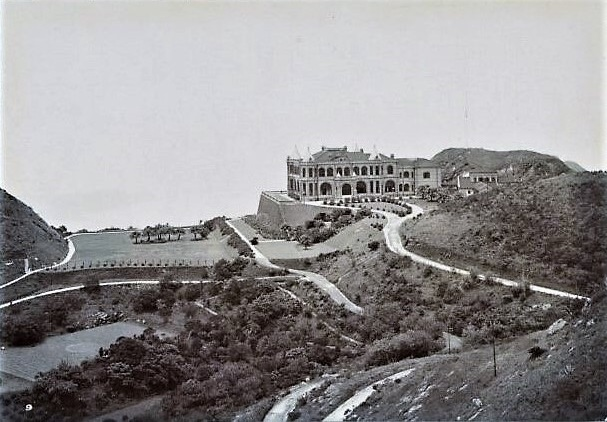
Historical image of the second Mountain Lodge.

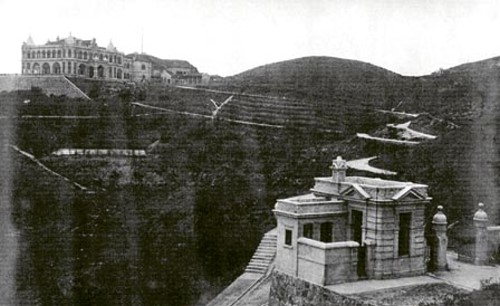
Historical image of the second Mountain Lodge, with the Gate Lodge in the foreground.

Mountain Lodge was the former summer residence of the Governor of Hong Kong on Victoria Peak on the Hong Kong Island in Hong Kong. The second building was a two-storey Renaissance style home and was demolished in 1946. The site is now the Victoria Peak Garden, a public park. The Gate Lodge, which originally served as living quarters for the keeper of Mountain Lodge, is still extant.

== History as a sanatorium ==
A military sanatorium was proposed and established by Governor Hercules Robinson (1859–1865). A path was cut in December 1859 from what is now Robinson Road to the top of Victoria Peak, and the sanatorium was opened in the spring of 1862. It was well-built on the plateau below the flag-staff and 17 patients were sent there. However, the patients, like those in the rest of Hong Kong that year, did not improve and the military abandoned the site.

The site was then used for picnics until 1867

Granville and Matilda Sharp (after whom Matilda Hospital is named) who had long advocated the Peak as a healthy alternative to the lower levels, took a lease of the deserted sanatorium.

== The first Mountain Lodge (1867–1897) ==
Governor MacDonnell (1866–1872), in 1867, purchased the building from the War Department and transformed it into the first Mountain Lodge—a bungalow to be built for the Governor's use. He had noted that the temperature was 14 °F (7.8 °C) less than Central District in the summer.

There were three main buildings at the first Mountain Lodge. The Lodge itself, faced toward Pok Fu Lam on one side, and the lawn on the other. Two smaller buildings, rather like large European-style cabins, and faced the lawn with their backs to the hillside. However, the lodge was severely damaged by a typhoon in the next year.

In 1873, Governor Kennedy (1872–1877) ordered to refurbish and extend the lodge, but it was again destroyed by a typhoon in 1874.

James Russell, Chief Justice of the Hong Kong supreme court, applied for a lease on the property in 1875, but it was not granted.

Governor Hennessy (1877–1882) engaged in an umbrella fight with a judge at Mountain Lodge, and lost. Photos of two of three buildings on the site are at this reference.

Sir William H. Marsh was Colonial Secretary and then the acting Governor, from 1879–1886. His wife, Mrs. Marsh advertised "at homes" at Mountain Lodge.

Sir William Des Vœux the governor of Hong Kong from 1887–1891 described the scenery of the Mountain Lodge as follows. "From the other verandah (of the Mountain Lodge), however, there was a magnificent prospect over the China Sea, comprehending a long line of mountainous coast and innumerable islands. Here in fine weather we spent most of our evenings watching the beautiful cloud effects at sunset, and sometimes, after dark, the exceptional brilliancy of the stars, at the same time greatly enjoying the restful silence. For from that spot neither sight nor sound gave any token of human existence, and it seemed difficult to realise that within so short a distance was a dense population."

In 1892, another typhoon did some damage. You can see photos of both the first and second incarnations of Mountain Lodge at this reference.

In 1892, Governor Robinson (1891–1898) designated the Director of Public Works, Francis Cooper, to restore the lodge. But due to the deteriorating condition of the lodge, the restoration scheme was given up and the lodge was demolished in 1898.

In 1892, the Gate Lodge was built is in Renaissance style. However, when Sir Henry Arthur Blake became governor, he did not like the proposals.

== The second Mountain Lodge (1900–1946) ==
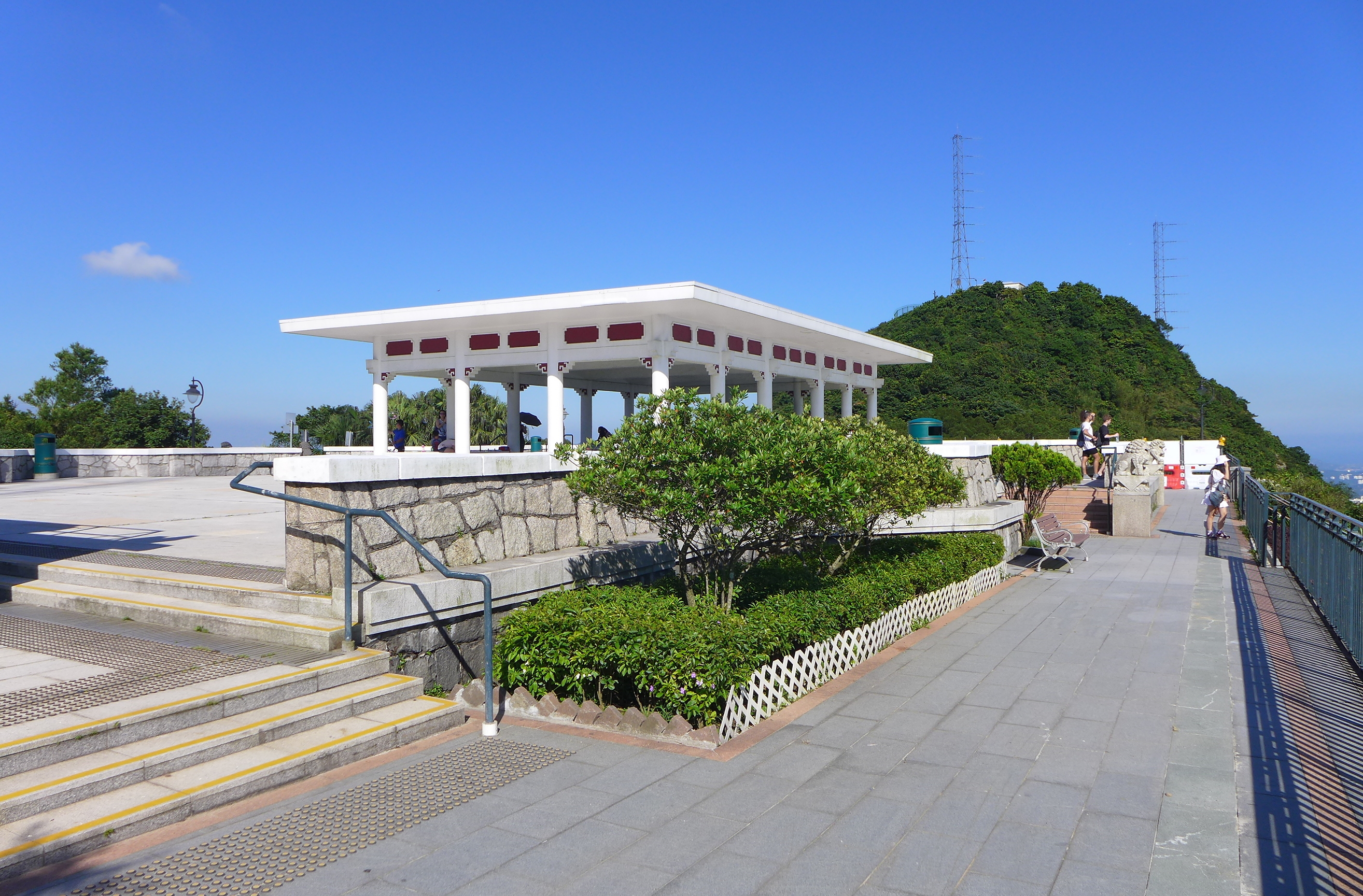
Pavilion built on the site of the former Mountain Lodge – 2016 photograph

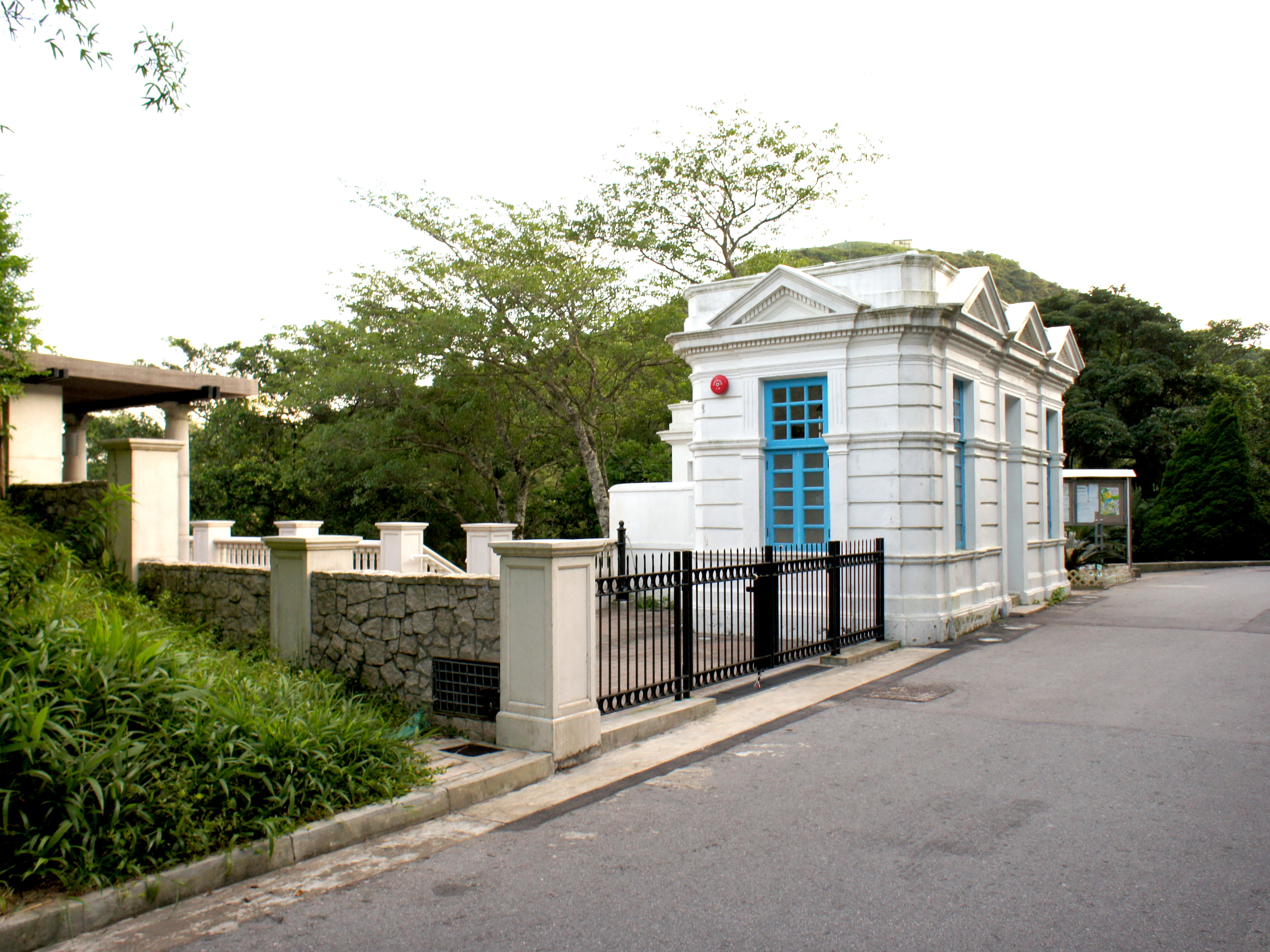
The Gate Lodge in 2011.

Instead, he appointed Palmer & Turner for another design. This second design was constructed in the Renaissance style of Scottish lodges and built between 1900 and 1902. The building was described by the media as the most imposing and handsome architecture on the Peak.

Governor Sir Francis Henry May and Lady May used it extensively and there are several photos of their family showing everyday life at Mountain Lodge 1910–1920. Thomas Southorn also lived there with his wife, including during 1925–1936.

Notes on the Photo: The lawn in front of the mansion is now the car park for the Victoria Peak Garden public park. The lawn on the lower left was the site of the first Mountain Lodge.

Sir Cecil Clementi had it refurnished for his use in 1925, and included a small safe.

In 1932, it was proposed that the Governor have a house in Fanling, and plans were then made to abandon Mountain Lodge. In 1938, it was proposed that both Government House and Mountain Lodge be abandoned, and a single home built at Magazine Gap.

The Second World War intervened.

The building, sometimes referred to as Former Mountain Lodge, no longer exists as it was demolished in 1946. The Gate Lodge and the granite foundations remain, however.

=== 2007 archaeological discovery ===
During the Peak improvement project in January 2007, pieces of wall, roof tiles and several in situ granite steps beneath the ground were found on the former Mountain Lodge site during pre-construction checks. They have been confirmed to be the original tiles and steps of the second Mountain Lodge. A report with photos showing the original tiles and steps is available online.

== Victoria Peak Garden (1969–present) ==
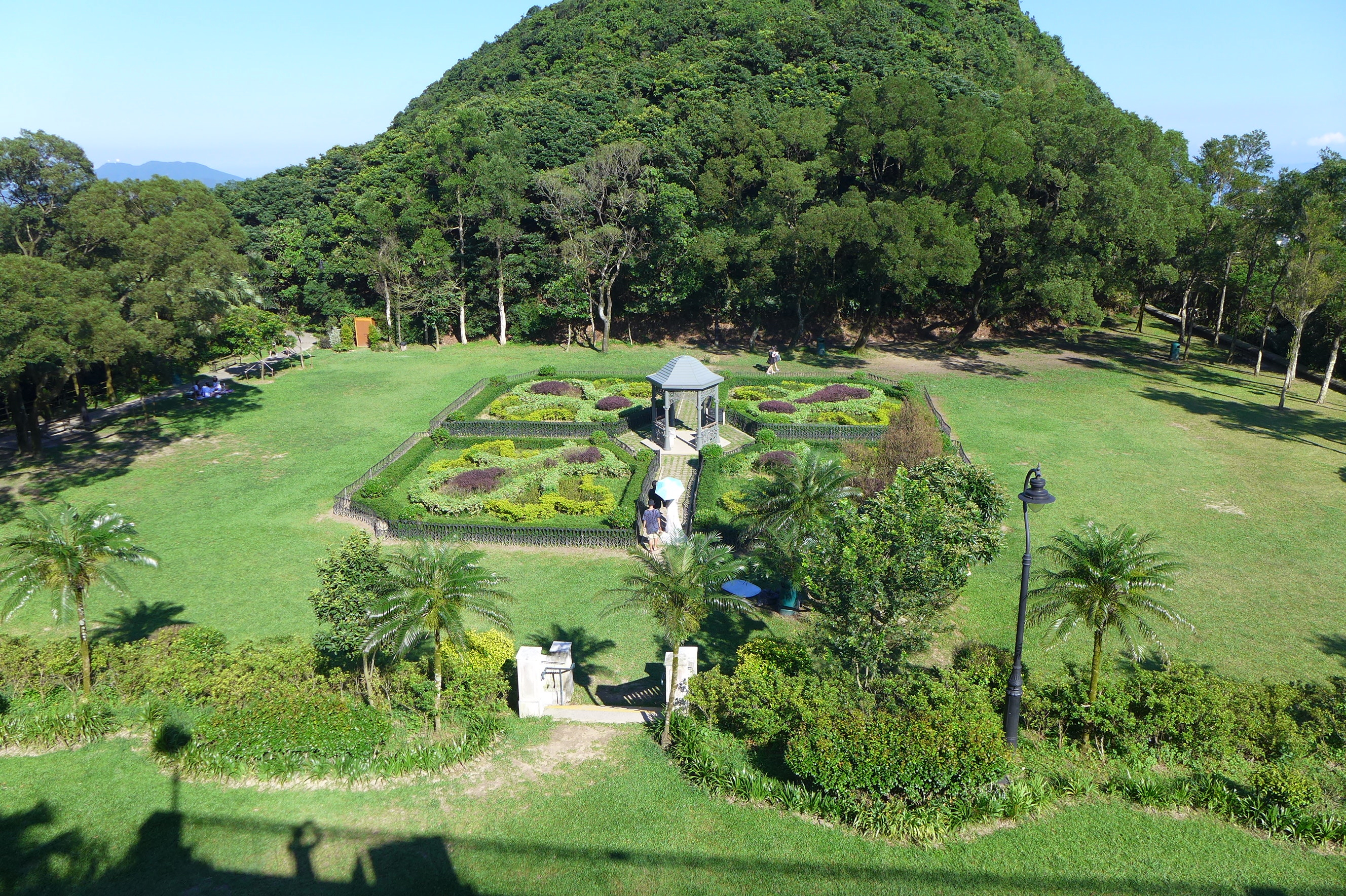
Victoria Peak Garden in 2016

In 1969, the former Urban Council redeveloped the site as a park (the current Victoria Peak Garden) with public facilities including a new pavilion, lighting and drainage systems, a car park, a kiosk and a public toilet at the west of the pavilion. The pavilion of the Garden was built upon the masonry platform of the former Mountain Lodge.

In 1979, a pair of stone lions, donated by businessman Mr. Chau Yau, was located at the northern entrance of the pavilion. Another pair of stone lions was donated by the Lions Club in the 1990s, which was placed at the southern entrance of the pavilion.

Three identical marking stones for the Lodge were rediscovered in 1978; since then, one of them has been placed at the northeast corner of the former lodge grounds. One of the three GOVERNORS RESIDENCE stones has been erected in a flowerbed close to the Government House, Mid-Levels since 1980.

== Plans ==
- Hong Kong Public Records Office Plan of Mountain Lodge proposed additions (floor plans and elevations), 28 October 1873.
- Hong Kong Public Records Office Plan of Mountain Lodge additions, from 1879–1894
- Hong Kong Public Records Office Plan of proposed Mountain Lodge September, 1899
