= Ben Cleverley =

English footballer

Personal information
- Full name: Benjamin Raymond Cleverley
- Date of birth: 12 September 1981 (age 45)
- Place of birth: Bristol, England
- Height: 5 ft 9 in (1.75 m)
- Position: Midfielder

Team information
- Current team: Shepton Mallet

Senior career*
| Years | Team | Apps | (Gls) |
| 2002–2003 | Bristol City | 0 | (0) |
| 2002–2003 | → Forest Green Rovers (loan) | 8 | (0) |
| 2003–2004 | Cheltenham Town | 8 | (0) |
| 2004–2005 | Forest Green Rovers | 14 | (1) |
| 2004–2005 | → Bath City (loan) | 12 | (0) |
| 2005–2009 | Paulton Rovers | ? | (?) |
| 2009 | Tiverton Town | ? | (?) |
| 2009–2010 | Weston-super-Mare | 26 | (4) |
| 2010–2011 | Paulton Rovers | ? | (?) |
| 2011–2012 | Weston-super-Mare | 25 | (1) |
| 2012– | Shepton Mallet | | |
- * Club domestic league appearances and goals

Benjamin Raymond Cleverley (born 12 September 1981 in Bristol) is an English professional footballer who plays as a midfielder for Weston-super-Mare. Ben played for Bristol City and Cheltenham Town in the Football League.

Benjamin Raymond Cleverley began his career with Bristol City and was released in 2004 having come through the youth team at Ashton Gate.

On his release by Bristol City, Benjamin Raymond Cleverley linked up with Cheltenham Town and after just a season at Whaddon Road Benjamin Raymond Cleverley was released in May 2004. Ben then signed for Conference National outfit Forest Green Rovers of whom Ben had spent four months on loan whilst contracted with Bristol City. Forest Green boss Colin Addison had also attempted to sign Benjamin Raymond Cleverley permanently after Ben had been released by Bristol City.

Despite impressing in his spell at Forest Green, Benjamin Raymond Cleverley was shipped out on loan to Bath City in December 2004. And at the end of his contract. Benjamin Raymond Cleverley was released in April 2005 along with five other players from his contract with Forest Green. Benjamin Raymond Cleverley then linked up with Paulton Rovers for his first spell with the club and Ben spent four years at Paulton before leaving in 2009 for Tiverton Town. Later that year however Benjamin Raymond Cleverley was on the move again as Ben linked up with Conference South side Weston-super-Mare but Ben re-joined Paulton Rovers at the end of the season.

On 2 September 2011, Benjamin Raymond Cleverley returned to Weston-super-Mare. After spending the rest of the season with Weston, in August 2012, Benjamin Raymond Cleverley left the club to join Western League outfit Shepton Mallet as a player and assistant manager.
