= Victoria Peak Garden =

Victorian style public garden in Hong Kong

Coordinates: 22°16′27″N 114°08′36″E

- 山頂公園
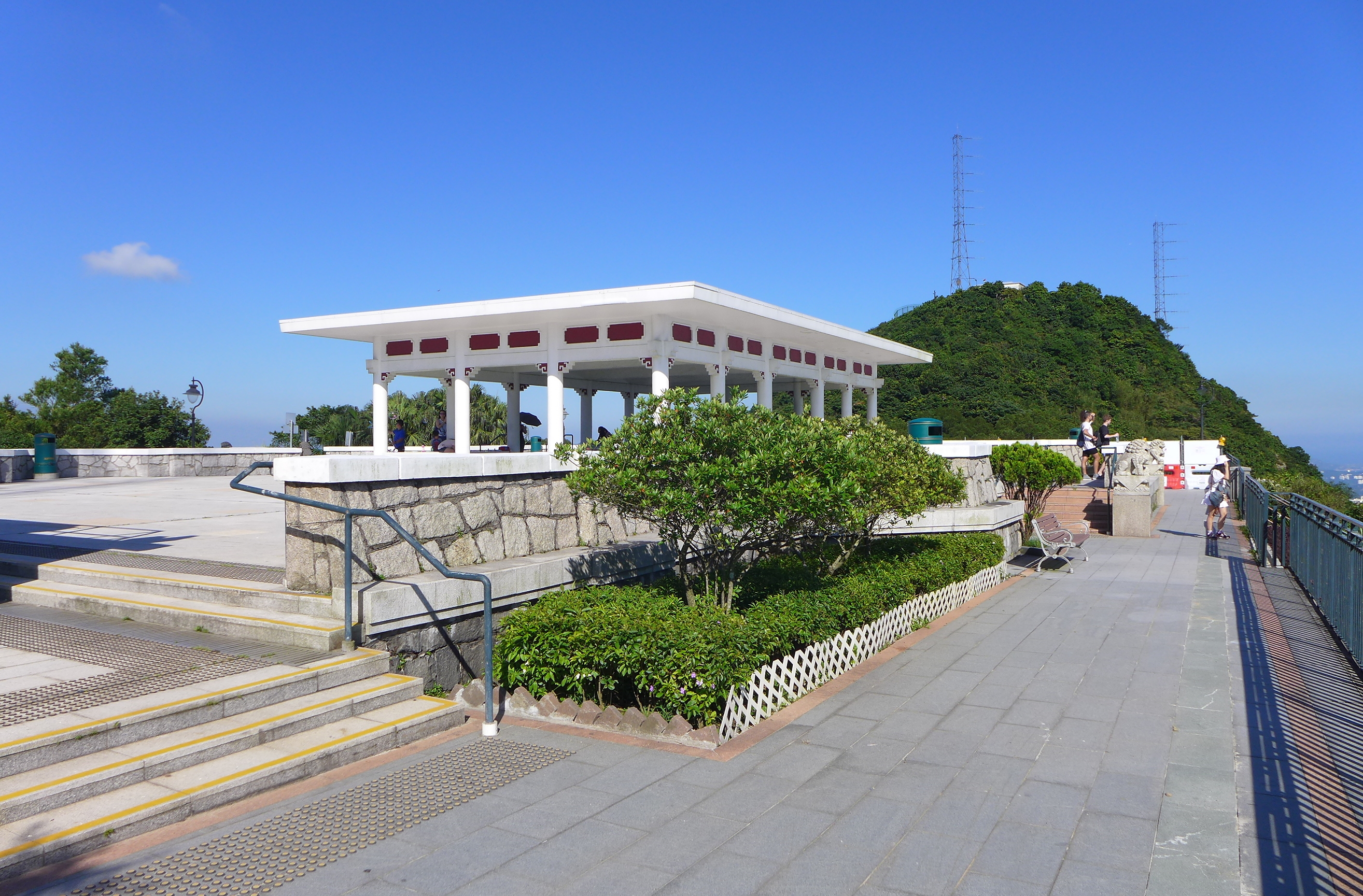
- Pavilion built on the site of the former Mountain Lodge.
- Interactive map of Victoria Peak Garden
- Location: Victoria Peak, Hong Kong
- Elevation: 300 metres (980 ft)
- Owner: Hong Kong Government
- Manager: Leisure and Cultural Services Department
- Public transit: Peak Tram

Victoria Peak Garden
- Traditional Chinese: 山頂公園
- Simplified Chinese: 山顶公园
Transcriptions
Standard Mandarin
- Hanyu Pinyin: Shāndǐng Gōngyuán
Yue: Cantonese
- Yale Romanization: Sāan déng gūng yún
- Jyutping: Saan1 deng2 gung1 jyun2

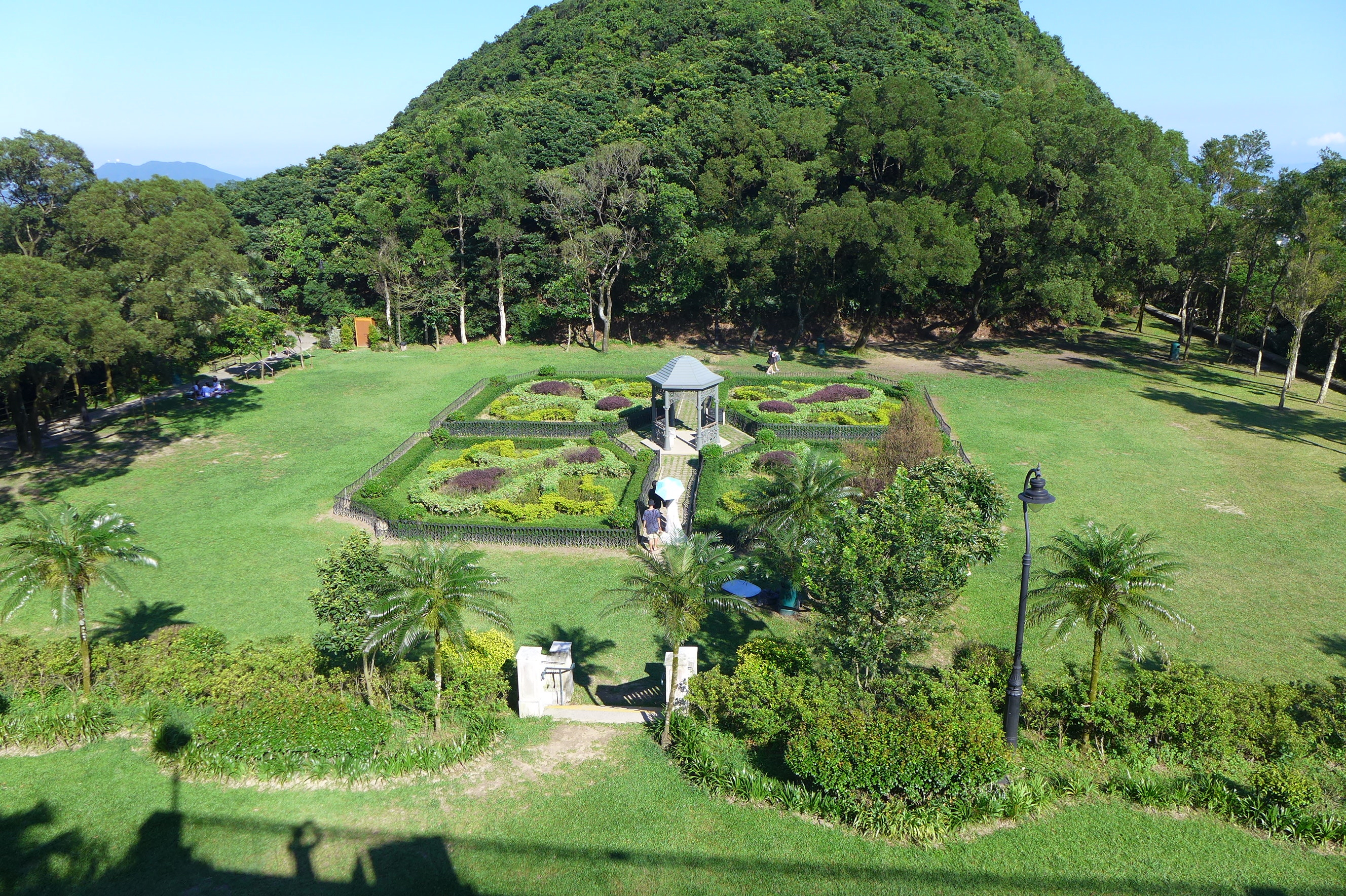
Big lawn with traditional British Garden design

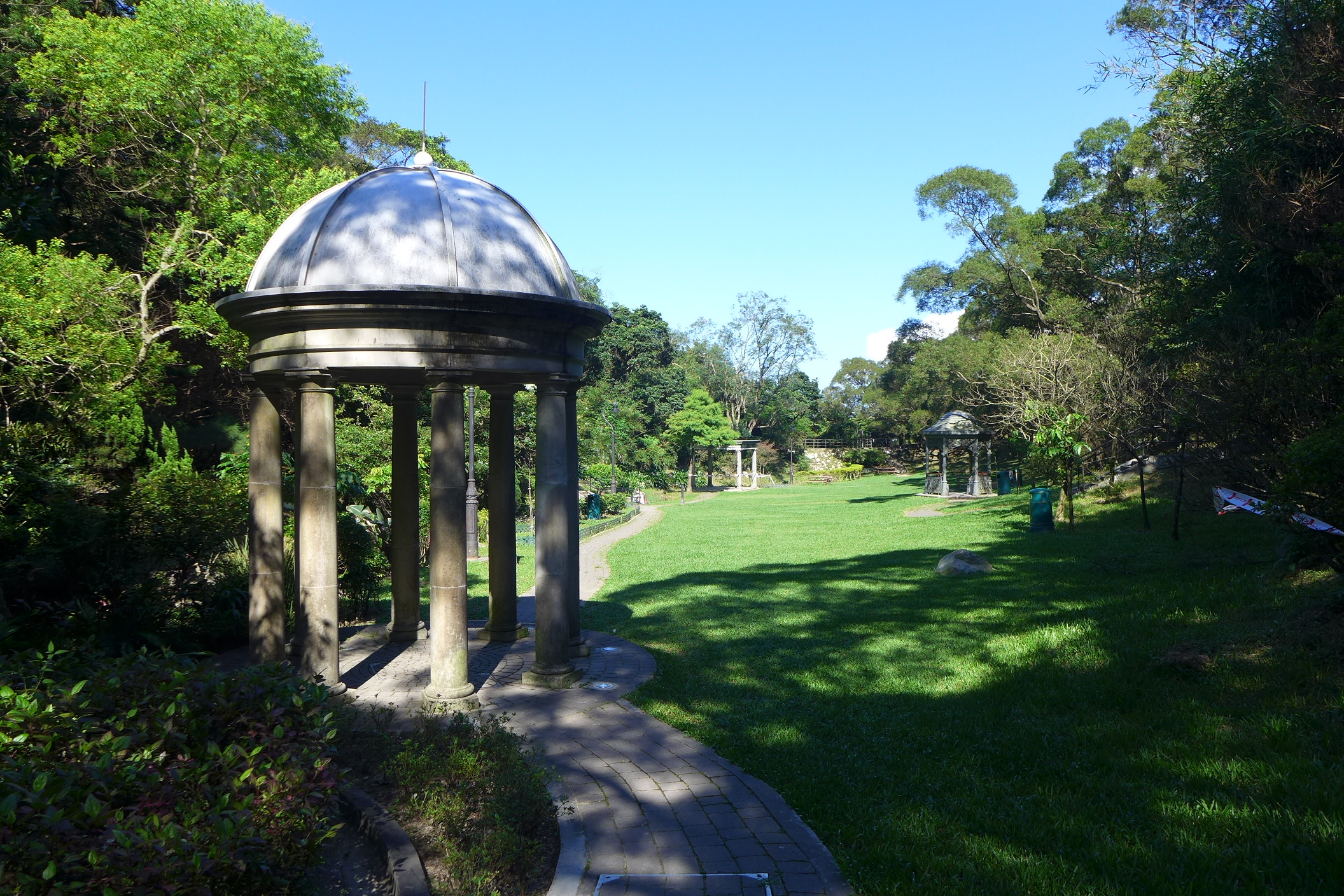
Pavilion in the garden

Victoria Peak Garden is a Victorian style garden near the summit of Victoria Peak in Hong Kong. The former Mountain Lodge, an alternate residence for the Governor of Hong Kong, was located there, which has since been demolished, but the park remains as an attraction at the Peak. It is managed by the Leisure and Cultural Services Department.

It is a vantage point which captures an over 300m high view of Victoria Harbour and the night scene of Hong Kong. The original landscape remains in the garden. Victoria Peak Garden is designated as an Inclusive Park for Pets.

== History ==
The Hong Kong government announced on 25 September 2005 that the site will be redeveloped along with the rest of the Peak area at a cost of HK$142.6 million.

== See also ==
- List of urban public parks and gardens in Hong Kong
