= Samuel Cleverley =

Samuel Cleverley or Cleverly (28 August 1772 – 9 November 1824) was an English physician. He was Royal Physician to the Duke of Kent and the Duke of Cambridge.

== Biography and career ==
Cleverley was born in Gravesend, Kent, the son of William Cleverly, a shipbuilder. After some schooling at Rochester he attended for two years the borough hospitals, whence he removed to Edinburgh and took the degree of M.D. on 24 June 1797 (inaugural essay, De Anasarca).

With the object of further studying his profession, he went abroad, visiting Halle, Göttingen, Vienna, and Paris. He was detained a prisoner in France for no less a period than eleven years, being confined successively at Fontainebleau, Verdun, and Valenciennes. At the latter depot, he passed the greater part of his detention. On his arrival he found the prisoners in the utmost need of medical assistance: "He accordingly proposed to the committee of Verdun, an association of the principal British officers and gentlemen in France, charged with the general distribution of charitable succours obtained from England, to give them his gratuitous care, which was gladly accepted, and a dispensary was in consequence established, though not without great difficulties from the French military authorities."

Cleverley was allowed to return home in 1814, when he received for his services at Valenciennes the marked thanks of the managing committee of Lloyd's. He eventually settled in London, was admitted a licentiate of the College of Physicians on 22 December 1815, and appointed one of the physicians to the London Fever Hospital.

He died of fever at his house in Queen Anne Street, Cavendish Square in 1824, leaving five sons (the eldest 14 years old) "in a destitute state" without him.
