= Civic engagement in Central and Wan Chai harbourfront development =

Civic engagement in Central and Wan Chai harbourfront development is a process of civic engagement initiated by the Government of Hong Kong to explore the future development of the Victoria Harbour and its harbourfront areas since 2004. It was launched in response to the government's defeat in the judicial review case against the Central and Wan Chai Reclamation projects.

== Background and history ==
Victoria Harbour, one of the most precious natural assets of Hong Kong, has long been playing an important role to Hong Kong, in terms of strategies, economy, infrastructure, and culture. The population of Hong Kong expanded rapidly in different periods. Therefore, the shortage of the land has always been an issue of the city, and harbour reclamation has been a preferred solution of it. By 1990, 2,500 hectares, more than one-third of the harbour (the original area was about 7,000 hectares), had been reclaimed. Moreover, the Metroplan published by the colonial government planned to reclaim another 1,297 hectares, which would lead to the loss of about half of the harbour in total. 661 hectares of the planned reclamation were completed, before the Protection of the Harbour Ordinance came into stage in 1997.

In the 1980s, harbour reclamation was accelerated in a high speed. Both economic development and improving the infrastructure of the city demanded a large amount of land. Other than the fact that there was a shortage of land coupled with a huge population, the sea reclamation policy had been used as a tool to boost “economic development and the commoditization of land”. These harbour-reclaimed land are usually located at the core areas of the city, which made it worth a higher price. Besides, upon reclamation, it could avoid confronting with local residents. In comparison to harbour reclamation, redevelopment of built-up areas was not the first choice of solving the shortage of land for the government.

Some critics pointed out that, harbour reclamation was not a sustainable way for the development of Hong Kong—the waterway transportation would be impeded, and the quality of water would be damaged. However, before the 1990s, few people paid their attention to negative effects of harbour reclamation, and the economic interest was always the first priority for the colonial government. In the 1990s, a massive reclamation plan was introduced. Winston Chu, a member of the Town Planning Board, set up the Society for Protection of the Harbour (“SPH”) in 1995. He was dissatisfied with “the massive reclamation but also by the entire process of executive-led planning”. In the last two years of the British rule, SPH successfully drew public attention to the government’s harbour reclamation proposals. Hence, more and more people were willing to speak out for going against the harbour reclamation.

As to the Central and Wan Chai Reclamation projects, property developers, as well as professional bodies opposed the project. The first time in 1998, a large exhibition was held, collecting opinions from the public, for opposing the reclamation projects. All these were reflected in the legislature—the chairlady declared to amend the Protection of the Harbour Ordinance, the restriction on reclamation was expended.

In February 2003, SPH initiated judicial review ("JR") proceedings against the Town Planning Board’s (“TPB”) decision in respect of the draft Wan Chai North Outline Zoning Plan (“OZP”) No. S/H25/1. The High Court delivered its judgment on the JR case, laying down the "three tests" to be applied to rebut the presumption against reclamation under section 3 of the Protection of the Harbour Ordinance in July. In the next month, TPB applied to Court of Final Appeal (“CFA”) for leave for the appeal case. Finally, in January 2004, the CFA handed down its judgment dismissing TPB's appeal against the High Court ruling on the draft Wan Chai North OZP, but substituting the High Court's "three test" by a "single overriding public need test".

SPH was the first organization set up for preserve the harbour in 1995. After that, different groups, and organizations put their effort on harbour protecting, such as Central-Wan Chai Reclamation Study Group (1998), Save Our Shorelines (1999), Action Group on Protection of the Harbour (2003), Friends of the Harbour (2003), Designing Hong Kong Harbour District (2003), Citizen Envisioning@Harbour (CE@H) (2003), and Harbour Business Forum. They have successfully launched a social movement.

== Civic engagement process ==
=== The Harbourfront Enhancement Committee ===
In the aftermath of the judicial review against the Wan Chai development project, the government was urged by the community to establish a committee composed of representatives from different sectors to explore the future development of the Victoria Harbour. As a result, the government decided to engage the public to reformulate the reclamation plans whilst ensuring full compliance with the Court of Final Appeal’s requirement of “overriding public need”.

The Harbourfront Enhancement Committee (“HEC”) was established in May 2004, which aims at safeguarding public enjoyment of the harbour through public participation guided by principles of sustainable development. The HEC was considered an innovative institution for a number of reasons. Firstly, it was no longer led by a government official, with Professor Chack-fan Lee, a senior engineering scholar from the University of Hong Kong being the chairperson. In addition, the composition of HEC entails government officials, the private sector, and civil society organisations, with organisations being invited to directly nominate their representatives to the Committee. Both the SPH and CE@H had appointed their representatives, while other corporate members are major professional groups and environmental groups. In essence, most of the important stakeholders of harbour protection have been included. Further, all meetings would proceed in an open manner with the minutes available to the public on the internet.

Indeed, the government has accepted social demand to preserve the harbour as a collective asset of Hong Kong. As reflected by the terms of reference, the role of the HEC includes protecting the harbour, improving the utilisation of harbourfront areas and safeguarding public enjoyment by means of public participation. Principles of sustainable development would be adopted when planning future land uses and development projects.

A number of subcommittees were further established under the HEC. In particular, the Subcommittee on Harbour Plan Review formulated the Harbour Planning Principles, which designated the vision of harbour planning as enhancing the harbourfront areas to become “an attractive, vibrant, accessible and sustainable world-class asset”. Some of the principles are of particular relevance to civic engagement and public enjoyment. For example, the principle for ‘preserving Victoria Harbour’ suggests that the harbour must be protected as special public asset, natural and cultural heritage asset so as to stimulate economic and social values. More importantly, the principle of ‘stakeholder engagement’ stipulates that in the course of planning and development of the harbour, all sectors must be engaged both at an initial stage and on an ongoing basis to achieve consensus.

The aforesaid principles upheld by the HEC, in fact, demonstrates the core values for harbour protection and development - namely to preserve and enhance the public asset nature as well as the cultural and leisure value of the Victoria Harbour. As for the economic aspect, it is more focused on strengthening the international attractiveness of Hong Kong by means of harbour development. In this connection, it seems that the traditional and longstanding policy of creating new land for urban development through reclamation no longer prevails in this century.

=== Public engagement mechanisms ===
The HEC developed a participatory planning model for creating an effective partnership between the Government and the civil society. The said strategy underlines the importance of achieving broad consensus, especially when reaching landmark decisions concerning the development for the harbourfront.

More importantly, the Harbour-front Enhancement Review includes three stages: the Envisioning Stage, the Realization Stage and the Detailed Planning Stage.

In the envisioning stage, the collaborators were offered the opportunity to formulate the central principles and to give their visions for the harbourfront developments, with an aim to provide a solid basis for the future endorsements of the Concept Plan and the Master Plan. To accomplish the aforementioned objectives, the concerned stakeholders and the general public were encouraged to express their concerns in the public forums and the community charrettes in 2005. Concerns in a number of issues such as transportation and urban design principles were expressed. Opinion surveys, telephone surveys, and written submissions were also employed in order to give the envisioning stage extensive coverage. Further, a consolidation forum and parallel discussions were also held with the members of the District Council, the Legislative Council and the Town Planning Board.

In the realization stage, the public was involved in an array of consultation activities for the purpose of eliciting opinions on the proposed Concept Plan. For instance, two sessions of Community Workshops and Harbour Walks were organised in 2006 respectively. The Government, moreover, invited differing views from the citizens and relevant parties through written submission of proposals and comments. What is more, the Consensus Building Town Hall Meetings was arranged and convened for possible improvements and evaluations to the Concept Plan.

In the detailed planning stage, the Recommended Outline Development Plan (“RODP”) was outlined, and the amendments to the OZPs were made based on the public comments and consensus reached in previous stages. It is worth mentioning that a public briefing was taken place in 2007 for the public to air their opinions on the RODP and the OZPs.

In conclusion, the HEC had made sustained effort in encouraging more public participation in the harbourfront scheme, and stimulated an open and transparent process for engaging all relevant parties.

=== Institutionalisation of harbourfront development ===
In December 2007, a Task Group on Management Model for the Harbourfront was established to bring forward the proposal concerning the institutional framework. In response to the recommendations of the Task Group, the Harbourfront Commission was established as a standing advisory body.

== Strengths and weaknesses ==
=== Positive achievements ===
==== Representativeness of HEC membership ====
The HEC is chaired by a senior engineering professor and Pro-Vice Chancellor from HKU. The chair of the HEC succeeded in getting cooperation and support from the government, contributing to the success of planning review of Central and Wanchai harbour front. It shows the public that the government allows expertise input rather than controlling the agenda. Unofficial members include citizens from various background, such as geography professor and property consultants. Besides, HEC provides for corporate representation. That means it invites organisations to appoint their own representatives to the HEC. For instance, Citizen Envisioning@Harbour, Business Environment Council and Friends of the Earth. Corporate representation can have more bargaining power against government policies because the representatives represent the body as a whole. Moreover, both SPH and CE@H have representations in the Committee, though they are usually confronted on government harbour reclamation plan.

==== Government-civil society synergy ====
The government allowed the HEC to conduct civic engagement activities. This can build trust and confidence among participants and raise the legitimacy of the final Outline Zoning Plan of the Wanchai North Reclamation. High degree of transparency allows wide public monitoring. All meetings are open to the public and all the minutes and related documents can be accessed by the public. Besides, civic engagement promotes public participation and social learning on the parts of government officials because different activities, such as interview, workshops and exhibitions, are organized to engage the public. This promotes state-society synergy and exchange of ideas between the government and the public.

==== Other factors contributing to the success ====
First, there is a strong civil society. The civil society was led by professional and expertise who provided solid and knowledge based discourse to counter government proposed policy. They offered an alternative policy that could have less reclamation. The civic engagement was indeed a direct result of societal mobilization and civil society activism played a strong role in shaping engagement process. For instance, the illegitimate government policies due to the judicial review forced the government to engage the public. Also, SPH organised the “Blue Ribbon Movement” in 2004 which attracted more than 10,000 citizens to participate. This showed the government that citizens were determined to protect the harbour. The use of cultural symbols and collective identity impressed the public to participate in the harbour protection movement and convert the issue into majoritarian politics. The concept of civic engagement was introduced by the CE@H to the government. Later on, the model of civic engagement CE@H adopted became the blueprint for the government future civic engagement process.

Second, the government agenda was opened to the public. The public can freely raise their opinions to the government. The chairman being an academic person also showed the public that the government would not like to dominate the policy-making process. This empowers citizens to consider they were able to influence the policy-making process, which enhances the efficiency of the civic engagement.

Third, it was a breakthrough by the government in the planning of the usage of public space. The civic engagement process transcended the old one-way approach of consultation to a more interactive civic engagement process. This can minimize future government-civil society confrontation and smoothen the policy implementation. Public felt their opinions were taken into account, this can hold the government responsive and accountable.

=== Limitations ===
==== HEC faced difficulties in agenda-setting ====
Even though the HEC aims at covering large areas concerning the harbour development, the government agenda was only keen on the reclamation of the Central and Wan Chai harbourfront. Also, the officials still retain the final power to exclude an item from discussion. Besides, HEC is only a non-statutory advisory committee, its suggestions are not legally binding, so the government may not implement the recommendations ultimately.

==== Perceived utilitarian attitude of the government ====
The government consulted the public mainly because it wanted the future reclamation plan get passed. From the very beginning, there was no mutual trust between the government and stakeholders. The participants complained that they need to put more effort in advocating government officials because officials usually would not follow their suggestions. For instance, some business and professional interviewees did to feel the government has taken into account their suggestions genuinely.

==== Dominance of the government ====
Even though the government re-opened the planning of Wanchai Reclamation Phase II, Central Reclamation Phase III was closed to public input. It may be because Central reclamation has high commercial value, therefore the government wants to retain control on the area. Also, since the Central reclamation plan was not quashed in the judicial review, the government would consider it unnecessary to engage the public.

== See also ==
- Central and Wan Chai Reclamation
- Protection of the Harbour Ordinance
- Society for Protection of the Harbour
- Victoria Harbour
