= Central and Wan Chai Reclamation =

Land reclamation in Hong Kong

- Traditional Chinese: 中環及灣仔填海計劃
- Simplified Chinese: 中环及湾仔填海计划
Transcriptions
Standard Mandarin
- Hanyu Pinyin: Zhōnghuán jí Wān Zǎi Tiánhǎi Jìhuà
Yue: Cantonese
- Jyutping: zung1 waan4 kap6 waan1 zai2 tin4 hoi2 gai3 waak6

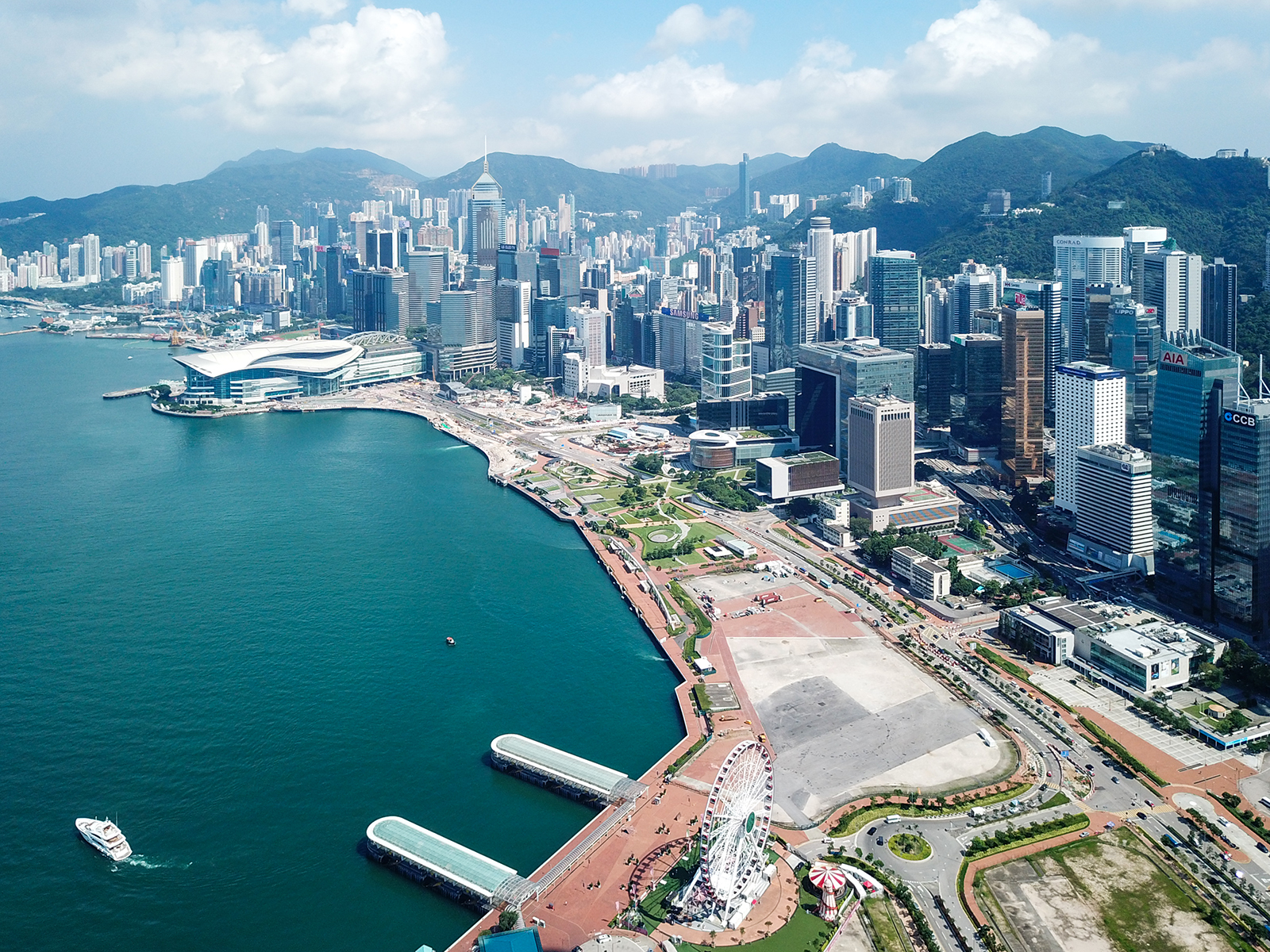
Reclamation completed in 2018

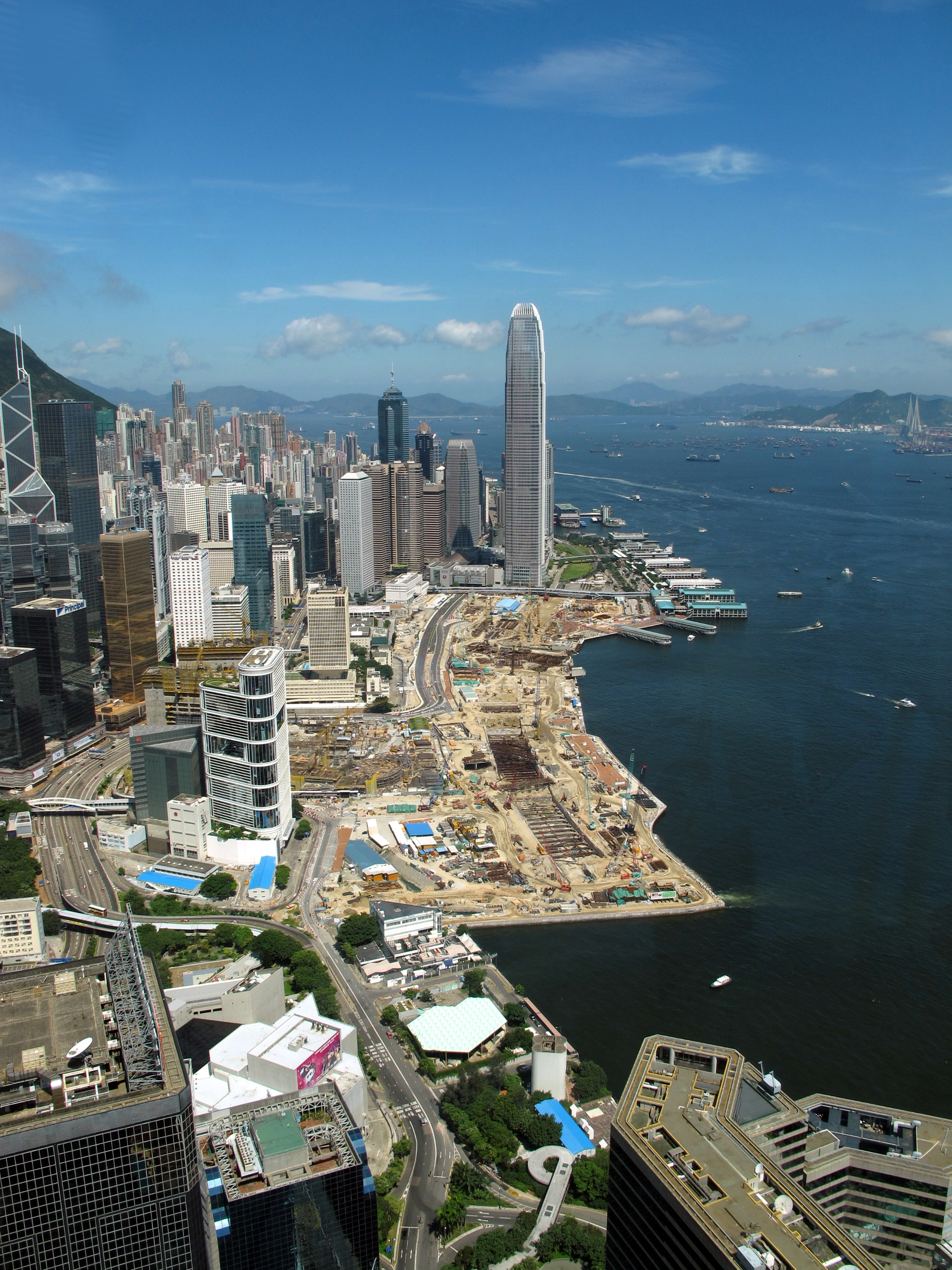
Victoria Harbour in July 2010, viewed from Central Plaza, Wan Chai.

Central and Wan Chai Reclamation is a project launched by the government of Hong Kong since the 1990s to reclaim land for different purposes. This includes transportation improvements such as the Hong Kong MTR station, Airport Express Railway & Central-Wan Chai Bypass, as well as public recreation space such as the Central Harbourfront Event Space, Tamar Park and the Hong Kong Observation Wheel.

== Background ==
The project was first mentioned in the 1985 planning strategy by the Government. The Government then completed a feasibility study in 1989, followed by endorsement of the then Land Development Policy Committee on the project.

=== Objectives ===
The proposed reclamation extends along the waterfront from Sheung Wan to Causeway Bay. The ostensible objectives of the project, among other things, include:

- to supply land for the Hong Kong station and the extended overrun tunnel of the Airport Express;
- to provide land for Central–Wan Chai Bypass and Island Eastern Corridor Link to replace Connaught, Harcourt, Gloucester and Victoria Park Road from Route 4;
- to offer land for the upcoming Sha Tin to Central Link;
- to give land for the potential North Island line;
- to improve the surroundings of neighbouring crowded districts by providing supplementary open space on the new reclamation; and
- to integrate the development with the existing areas.

== The project ==
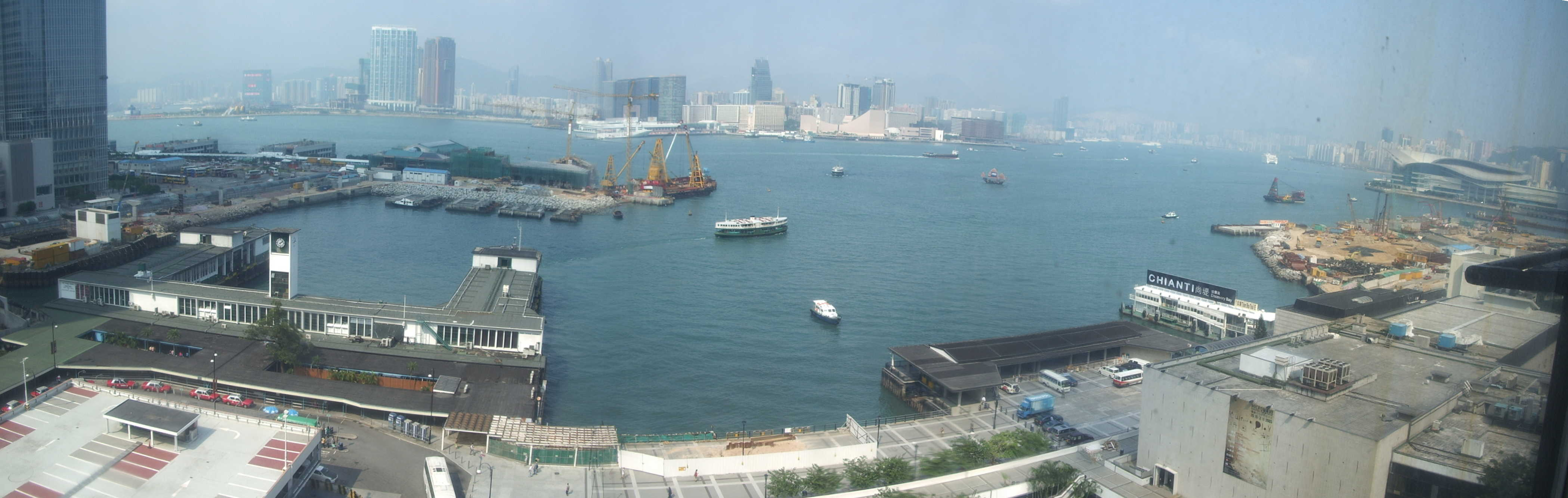
Victoria Harbour as of 14 October 2005, viewed from City Hall, Central. Note that Central Reclamation Phase 3 has just started.

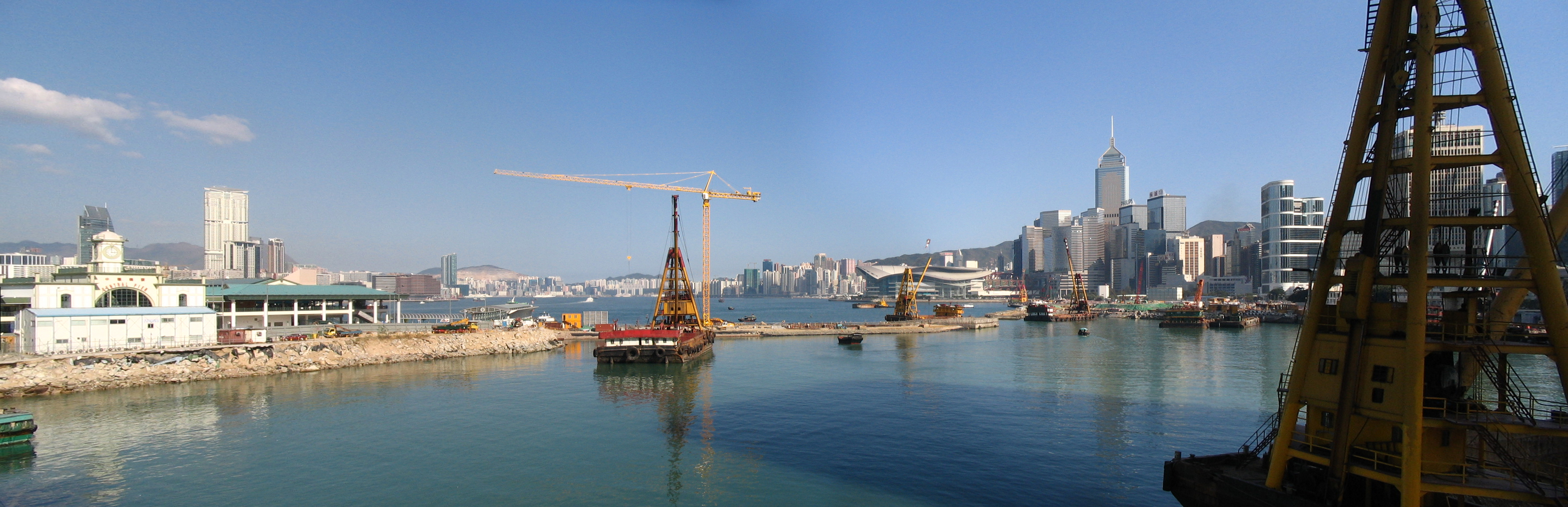
Central Reclamation Phase 3 during January 2008

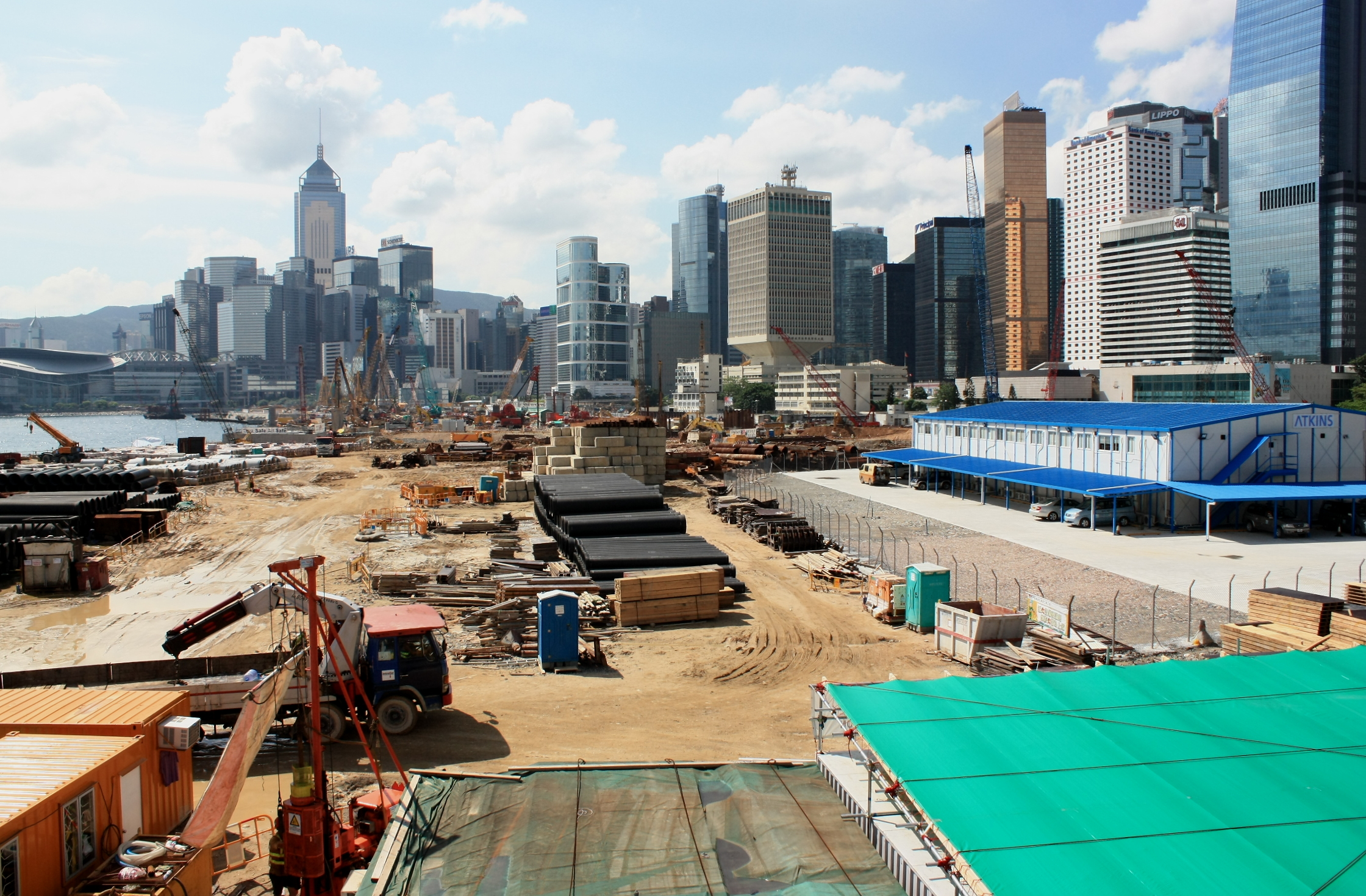
Central Reclamation Phase 3 during June 2009

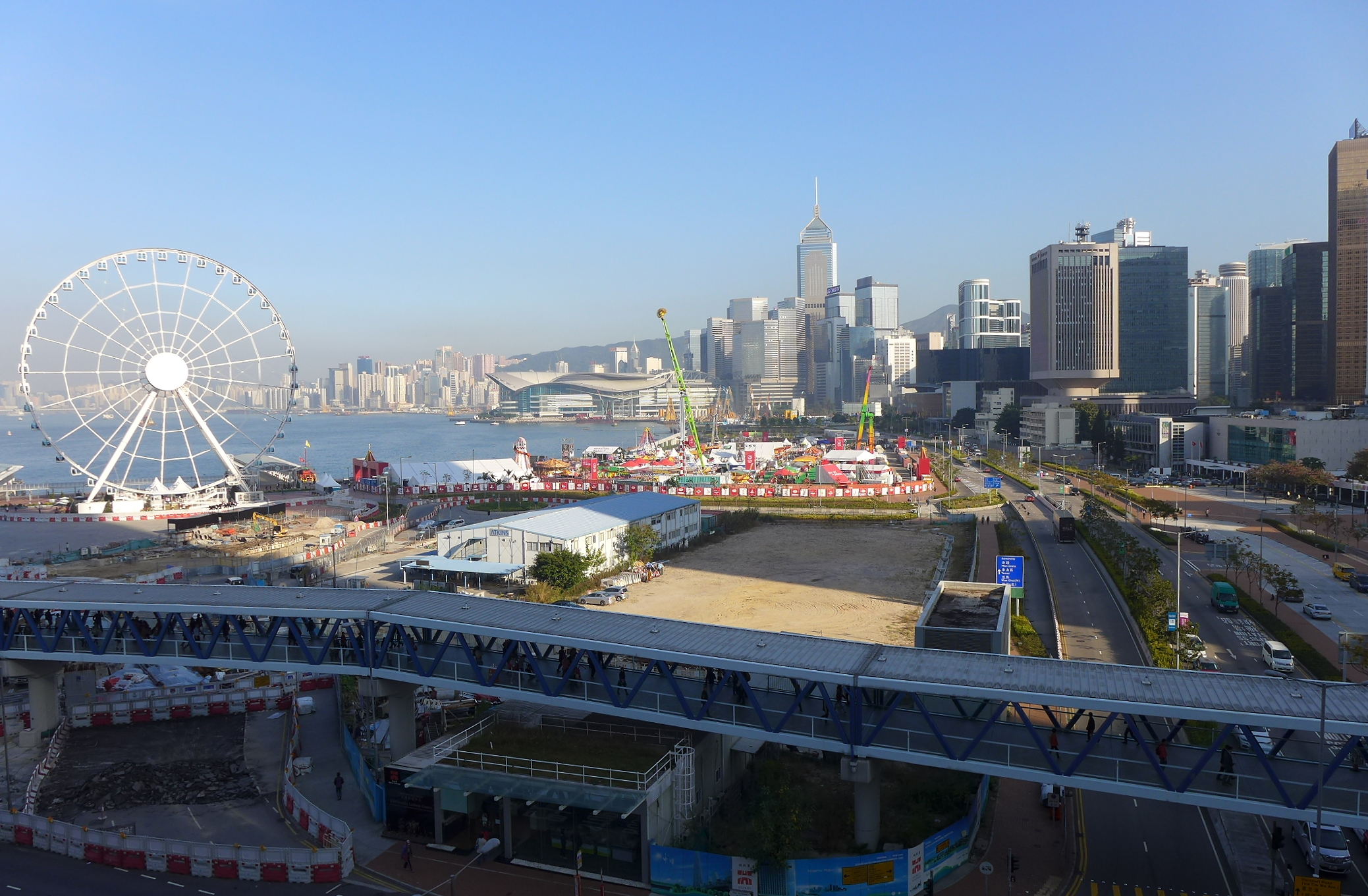
Central Reclamation Phase 3 during Jan 2015

The project is divided into five phases.

=== Central Reclamation ===
==== Central Phase I ====
The Central Reclamation Phase 1 involved reclaiming 20 hectares of land, plus redevelopment of 6 hectares of land, between Rumsey Street and Pedder Street, for the construction of Hong Kong station of the Airport Express Railway. It also provided land for new piers, replacements of other facilities affected by reclamation. Works started in 1993 and were completed in June 1998. This phase of reclamation is part of the Airport Core Programme. The cost was HK$2,710 million. Upon completion of the project, the coastline of Central was extended up to 350 metres beyond the original coastline.

==== Central Phase II ====
The Central Reclamation Phase 2 reclaimed 5.3 hectares of land at the former Tamar naval base. The reclamation formed land for the Tamar Site, and also five commercial development sites. Works started in December 1994 and were completed in September 1997. The cost was HK$320 million.

It has been proposed that a new complex housing the headquarters of the Government and the Legislative Council be built on the reclaimed land.

==== Central Phase III ====
The Central Reclamation Phase 3 involves reclamation for the overrun track of Airport Express, the west section of the proposed North Island line and the Central-Wan Chai Bypass, new Star Ferry piers, new roads, and other facilities. The cost is HK$3,561.5 million. It was originally planned to reclaim 32 hectares of land, but has been reduced to 18 due to public opposition.

Works have started on 28 February 2003. Above-ground construction is scheduled to be completed in 2011. The underground Central–Wan Chai Bypass has opened on 20 January 2019.

=== Wan Chai Development Project ===
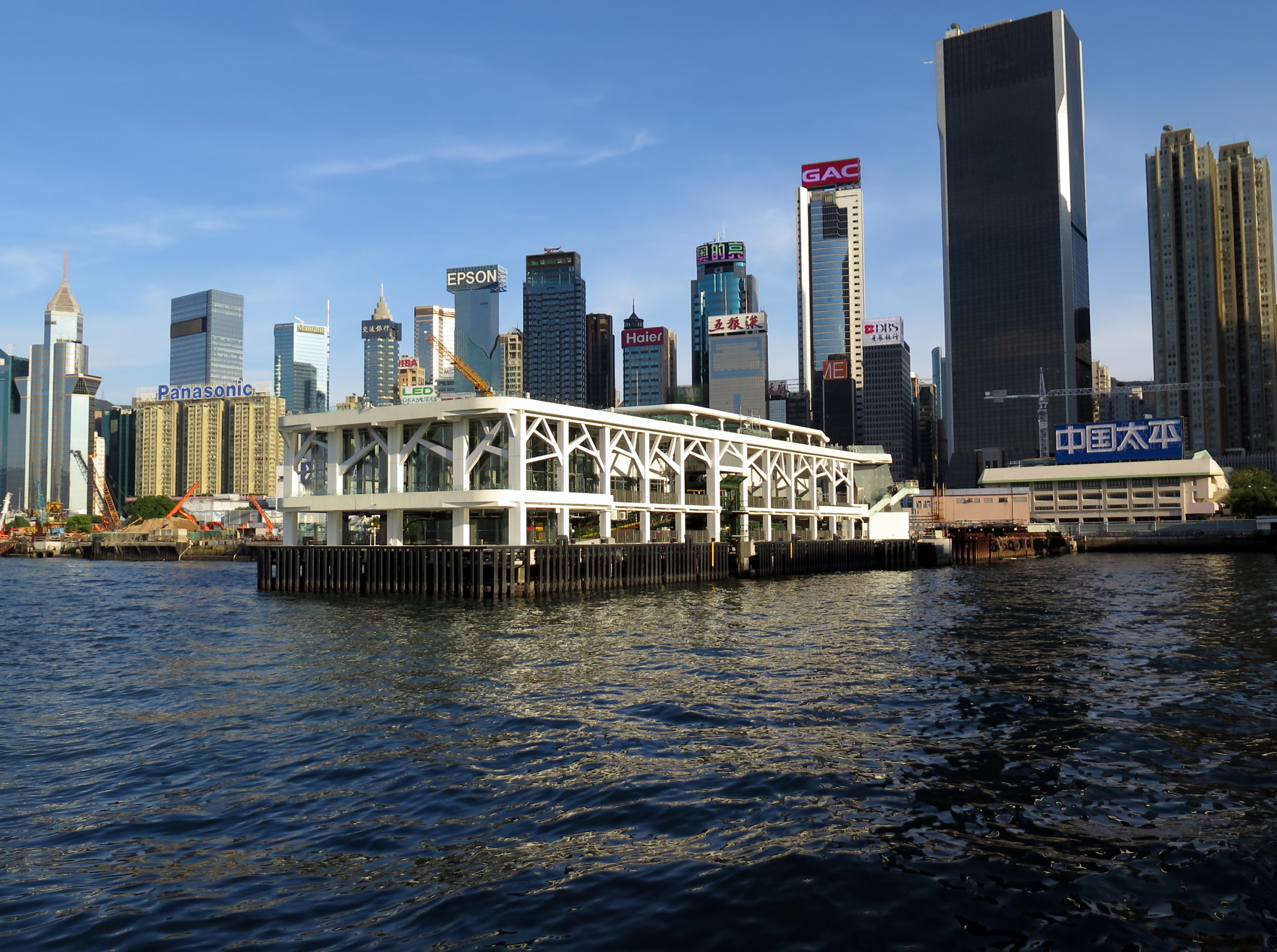
New Wan Chai Pier

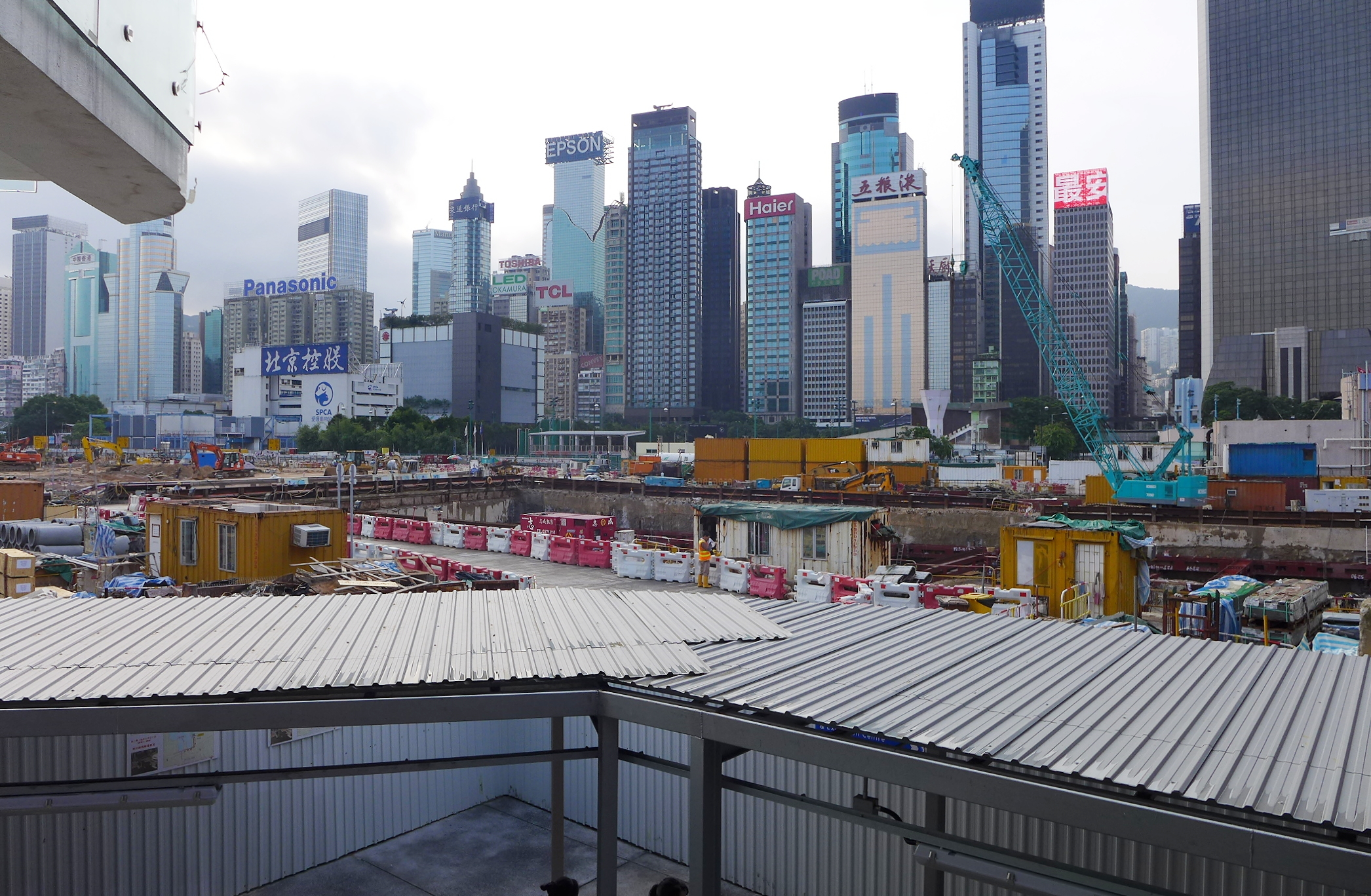
Wan Chai Reclamation Phase 2 during Oct 2014

==== Wan Chai Phase I ====
Wan Chai Reclamation Phase I (also known as 'Island Reclamation for the Hong Kong Convention and Exhibition Centre Extension') includes the formation of an island of 70,000 m^{2} by reclamation at the northern side of the Hong Kong Convention and Exhibition Centre to supply land for building an additional room to the centre. The island configuration is to ensure that water quality in the vicinity remained at satisfactory levels after reclamation was completed. Works commenced in March 1994 and were completed in July 1997.

==== Wan Chai Phase II ====
Wan Chai Development Phase II extends along the water's edge from the Central Reclamation Phase III to Causeway Bay. This HK$10.5-billion project, together with Central Reclamation Phases I, II and III, is mainly to provide land for the construction of the Central–Wan Chai Bypass and the Island Eastern Corridor Link, the Hong Kong Island section of the Sha Tin-to-Central Link and the North Island line. Construction work commenced in 2009 and is planned to be completed in 2017.

Because of the multi-faceted nature of the project, involving road creation, land reclamation and foreshore development, the project is overseen jointly by Highways Department and Civil Engineering and Development Department, who together commission a single contractor for each location involved.

The works involve the temporary reclamation – for a period of several years – of Causeway Bay Typhoon Shelter and the former public cargo working area. In a judicial review before the Court of First Instance, it was held in March 2008 that the Protection of the Harbour Ordinance applied to such works, and hence the government was required to demonstrate an 'over-riding public need' for the reclamation. It undertook to keep the temporary reclamation "to the minimum" and to reinstate the seabed after completion of the construction works.

== Controversy ==
=== Public protests ===
Not everyone welcomed with the reclamation plan warmly. Some Hong Kong residents thought the action was totally unnecessary; it did nothing good, merely reducing the size of Victoria Harbour. Instead of building a bypass, the opponents urge the government to start an electronic road toll scheme in the community.

On 5 October 2003, over 1,000 protesters dressed in blue marched on the Central Government Offices calling for a halt to reclamation work in the harbour. They also promised to follow up with a three-pronged protest next month using land, sea and air to get their message across. The march was one of several protests in recent weeks over harbour projects, which the government says are necessary to ease traffic congestion in Central strictly due to the increase in private cars (the number of commercial vehicles and public transport vehicles have decreased over time). The government had lost the first round of a court battle, but then appealed against the decision.

The Society for Protection of the Harbour (SPH) applied for a stay of order and judicial review on 25 September 2003, prohibiting the government from continuing with the third phase of the Central reclamation project. The government resumed work to reclaim 230,000 m^{2} of the harbour after the society failed in its bid to get hold of a court order to provisionally halt work ahead of December's judicial review.

In September 2004, legislator Law Chi-kwong took a swim in Victoria Harbour bearing a plaque saying "Goodbye to the Queen", to protest the Central and Wan Chai Reclamation, particularly the loss of Queen's Pier.

Further public furore erupted in late 2006 when it was revealed the plans would involve the destruction of two notable 50-year-old landmarks at the waterfront, namely the Edinburgh Place Ferry Pier and Queen's Pier. Both have become potent symbols for environmentalists, who have staged protests and rallies in the light of strong public opinion to preserve the collective memory of Hong Kong.

=== Judicial review ===
The SPH requested judicial reviews on the Reclamation, on 27 February 2003 and 25 September 2003 respectively. On 6 October 2003 the High Court announced that the Government may proceed with the Central Reclamation, however on 1 September 2004 the Court of Final Appeal rejected the Town Planning Board's proposal on the draft Wan Chai North outline zoning plan (OZP), and the Wan Chai Development Phase 2 had to be reviewed.

In an effort to soften opposition to the reclamation project, the Government proposed that the reclaimed land above the underground transport infrastructure could be used to construct a world-class waterfront promenade.

=== Marine pollution ===
In October 2003, Greenpeace said that the Central reclamation would create 580,000 cubic metres of toxic silt, 63% of which was classified as "seriously contaminated" by the Environmental Protection Department. The activists were repelled when they attempted to collect mud samples from the Central reclamation site for analysis. The Government was accused by Greenpeace of using "cheap and outdated" dredging methods during reclamations which leak toxic waste into the harbour.

It stood accused also of dumping the dredged toxic waste in outlying island sites near an artificial reef created to protect marine life such as the Chinese white dolphin. Fishermen reported that average catch had been cut by half since the reclamation started. The Government responded that reclamation "would not cause irreversible marine damage."

=== Tender ===
The Government was found to have breached World Trade Organization tendering rules in awarding the contract by unfairly changing the tendering conditions of the third phase of the reclamation after the tender was closed. However, the WTO ruling was not legally binding.

== See also ==
- Airport Core Programme
- Land reclamation in Hong Kong
- Civic engagement in Central and Wan Chai harbourfront development
