= HK City Sightseeing =

Brand of sightseeing transportation service

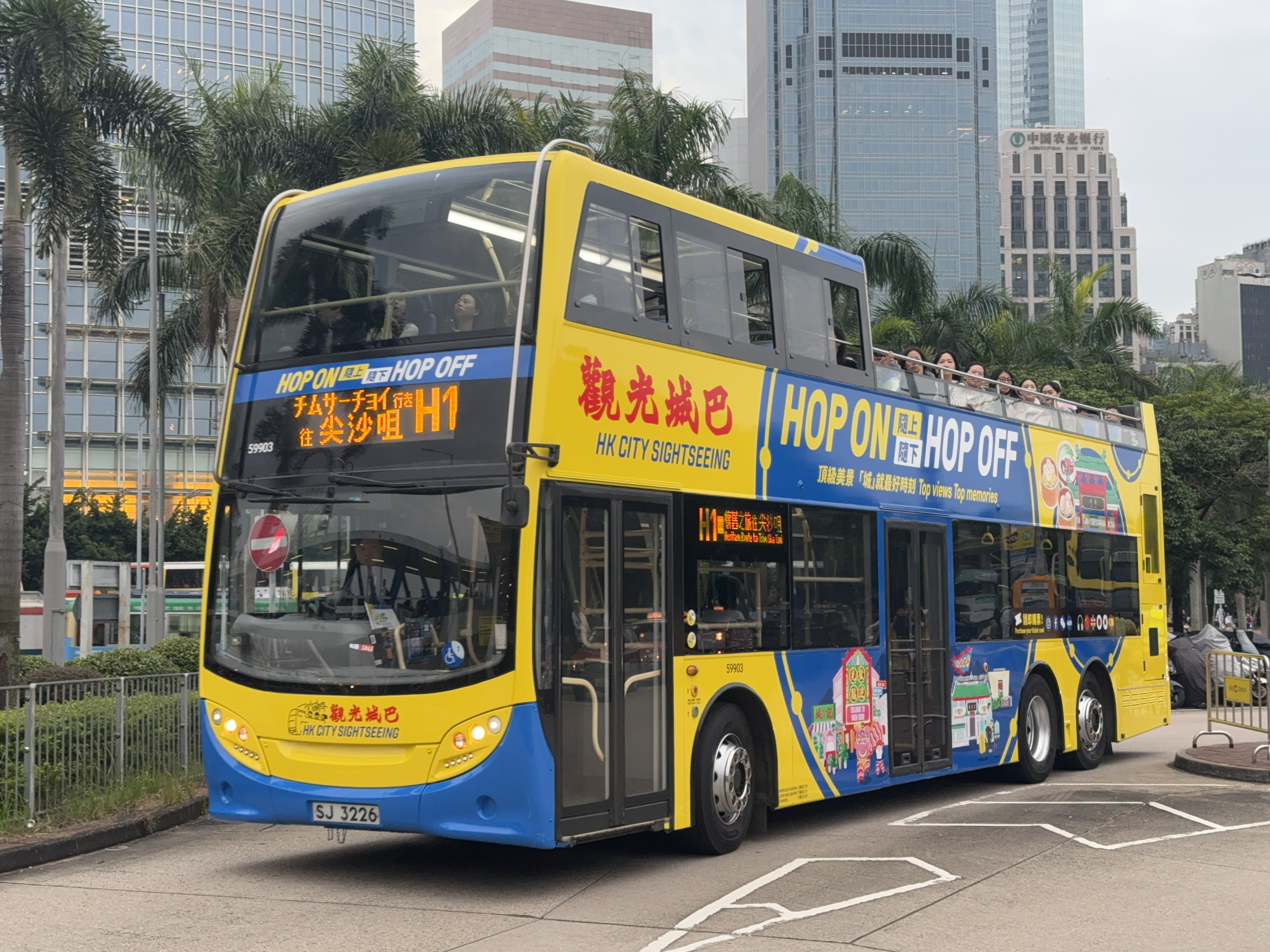
A HK City Sightseeing Bus

HK City Sightseeing (Chinese: 觀光城巴) is a brand of sightseeing transportation service operated by Citybus, one of the franchised bus services operators in Hong Kong. It was operated by New World First Bus and formerly known as Rickshaw Sightseeing Bus (Chinese: 人力車觀光巴士) before it was merged into Citybus on 1 July 2023. It offers a thematic sightseeing route by open-top sightseeing buses, aims to facilitate visitors to explore local culture and diverse attractions of Hong Kong.

The Rickshaw Sightseeing Bus brand was introduced on 18 October 2009, intended to reminisce the early days of Hong Kong for visitors and local citizens, and also to facilitate the up-growing demand of individual travelers. Before 13 December 2014, there were two routes which called "H1 Heritage Tour" and "H2 Metropolis Tour".

Rickshaw Sightseeing Bus was rebranded as HK City Sightseeing in 2024. On 21 February 2025, Citybus announced that HK City Sightseeing had expanded its operation to the Southern District and added new routes H3 and H4.

== Routes ==
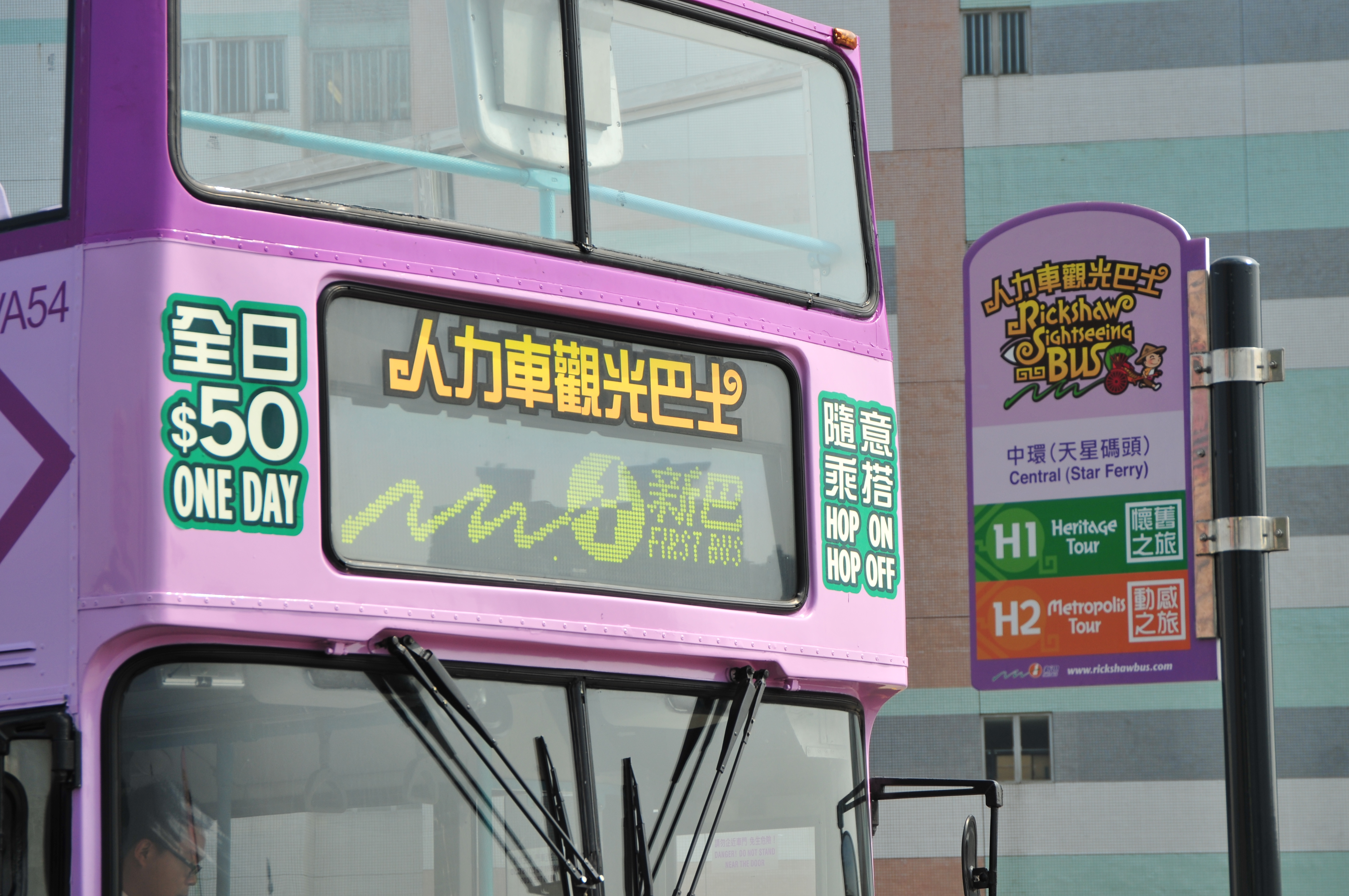
Bus stop sign of Rickshaw Sightseeing Bus before rebranding

Citybus currently operates six HK City Sightseeing routes.

Route List of HK City Sightseeing
Route No.	Destination	Major spots
Heritage Route H1	Central Piers → Tsim Sha Tsui	Exchange Square, Hollywood Road (Man Mo Temple / Sun Yat-sen Historical Trail / Tai Kwun), Lan Kwai Fong, Statue Square, Admiralty Station, Queen's Road East, Causeway Bay (Hysan Place), Golden Bauhinia Square, Avenue of Stars, East Tsim Sha Tsui Waterfront
Cultural Route H2	Tsim Sha Tsui → Central Piers	Nathan Road (Temple Street, Langham Place), West Kowloon Cultural District, Canton Road (Harbour City / 1881), East Tsim Sha Tsui Waterfront, Causeway Bay (Elizabeth House), Hong Kong Convention and Exhibition Centre
Night Scene Hong Kong H2K	Central Piers ↺ West Kowloon Cultural District	Wan Chai North, Jordan, West Kowloon Cultural District, Tsim Sha Tsui, Causeway Bay (Elizabeth House)
Coastliner H3	Hong Kong Observation Wheel → Stanley	Admiralty Station, Golden Bauhinia Square, Ocean Park Hong Kong, Deep Water Bay, Repulse Bay, Stanley Plaza
Coastliner H4	Stanley → Hong Kong Observation Wheel	Stanley Plaza, Repulse Bay, Deep Water Bay, Ocean Park Hong Kong, Aberdeen, Pok Fu Lam Village, The University of Hong Kong, Kennedy Town New Praya

The basic frequency of the above routes is every 60 minutes, but will be increased to 8-30 minutes in response to passenger demand.

== Fleet ==
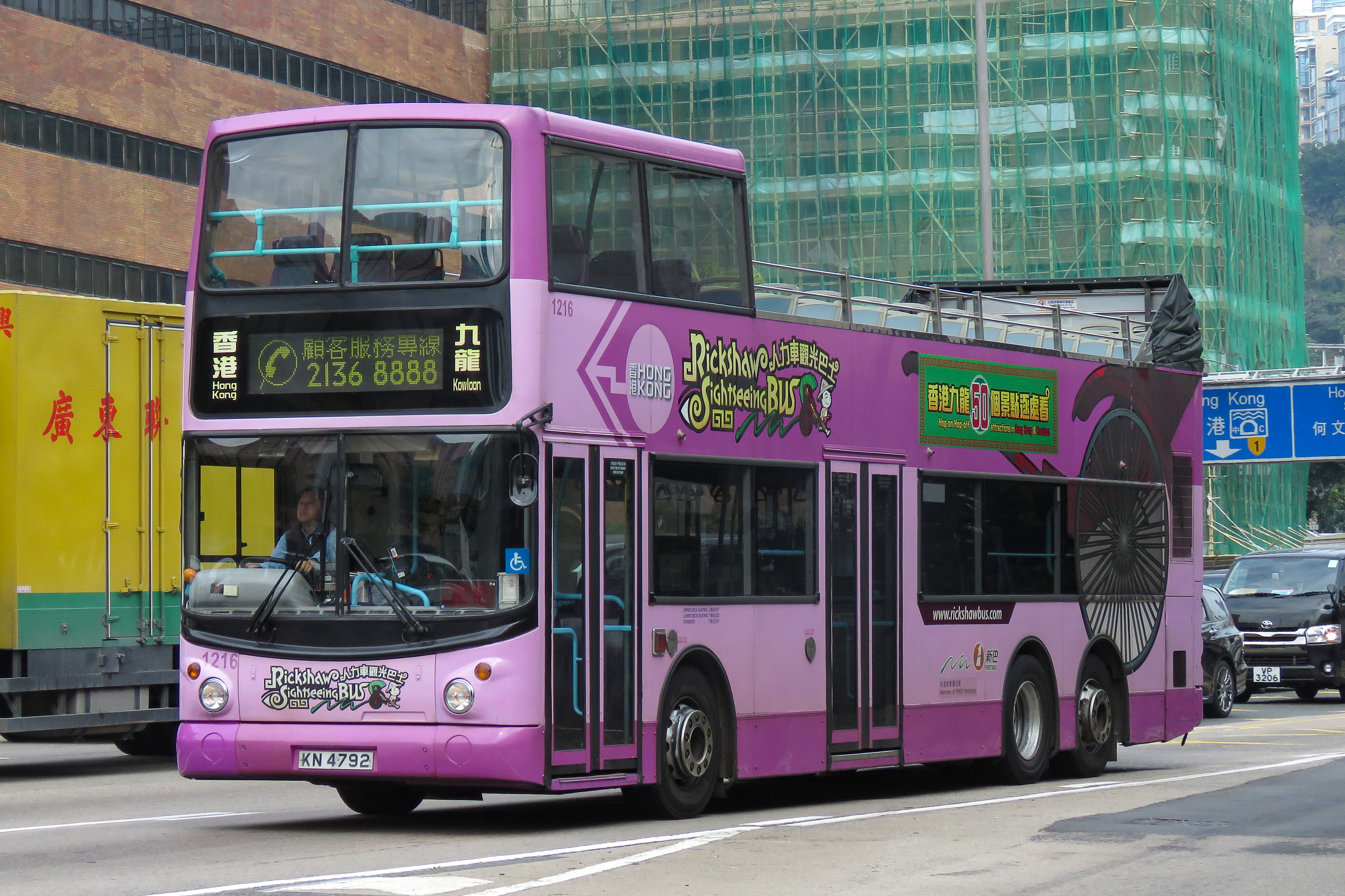
Alexander ALX500 bodied Dennis Trident at Cross Harbour Tunnel Toll Plaza in January 2019

Currently, HK City Sightseeing operates mainly with Alexander Dennis Enviro500 and Alexander Dennis Enviro500 MMC buses, all converted from Citybus or NWFB's regular fleet to open-top buses.

Starting from February 2015, a batch of five 2002 Dennis Trident 12-metre (fleet number 1215-1219) were converted into half open-topped sightseeing bus and replace the 11-metre Volvo Olympians. The old Olympians will start to transfer to Citybus and replace the old open-topped Leyland Olympians. VA51 had its last day service on Route H1 on 15 April 2015 while the replacement Tridents were not ready for service until 16 May 2015. During this period, New World First Bus were using standard buses including Dennis Tridents (fleet number 1180 and 3313) and Alexander Dennis Enviro500s (fleet number 4040 which had been repainted into Arts Bus on the Move 2015 livery, 5518 and 5539 which are in standard livery and 5568 which had been repainted into 2015 Year of The Goat Chinese Zodiac Bus livery). The first half open-topped Trident, 1215, finally entered service on 16 May 2015 operating on the first departure that day. The second and the third new open-topped buses entered service on 19 May 2015 and 20 June 2015. The second Olympian to be transferred to Citybus was VA54 and its last day service was 17 May 2015 and it was repainted into red 'Auntie Nora' livery to replace the AEC Routemaster open-topped vintage bus in the Citybus fleet. VA51 and VA54 changed their fleet numbers into 22 and 23 and finally joined Citybus in June 2015.

In February 2020, the Alexander Dennis Enviro500 joined the fleet, replacing Dennis Trident.

In mid-2024, in line with the rebranding, Citybus started to refurbish its open-top buses by converting the original Ricksaw Sightseeing buses into HK City Sightseeing buses.

In June 2026, HK City Sightseeing is operating a total of 24 open-top buses, becoming greater China's largest open-top city tour and Hong Kong's largest opentop bus fleet.

Fleet list
Fleet Type		Fleet number	Quantity	Upper Deck Seating	Lower Deck Seating
Half Open Top	Alexander Dennis Enviro500 12m	270-272	3	57	31
Half Open Top	Alexander Dennis Enviro500 MMC 12m	273-276	4	59	31
Half Open Top	Alexander Dennis Enviro500 MMC 11.3m	895-899	5	55	25
Full Open Top	Alexander Dennis Enviro500 12m (Non-franchised)	30-33	4	57	31
Full Open Top	Alexander Dennis Enviro500 MMC 12m	277-281	5	59	31
Full Open Top	Alexander Dennis Enviro500 MMC 11.3m (Non-franchised)	27-29	3	55	25

== Fare ==
=== Single Journey ===
- H1/H2/H2K: HK$47.6 (Child/Elder: HK$23.8)
  Apart from the Central Star Ferry Pier, there is a terminus at the Peninsula Hotel in Tsim Sha Tsui. Passengers who pay a single journey fare must pay the fare again when boarding the bus for the return journey (for route H2K, the fare will be paid again when alighting for the return journey).
- H3/H4: HK$49.7 (Child/Elder: HK$24.9)
  Apart from the Central Hong Kong Observation Wheel, there is a terminus at Stanley Village. Passengers who pay a single journey fare must pay again when boarding the bus on the return journey

Passengers can also use the following methods to pay the single journey fare directly when boarding.

- Octopus Card
- Transit QR code of AlipayHK, Alipay, UnionPay, BoC Pay+, Wechat Pay HK, WeChat Pay
- Contactless Visa, Mastercard and UnionPay card
- Apple Pay, Google Pay, Samsung Pay and Huawei Pay
- Hong Kong Dollar (exact fare, no change)

=== Multiride Tickets ===
- All ticket holders can enjoy priority boarding at the Central (Star Ferry) Terminus.
- All tickets can be purchased by cash or e-payment at the Central Piers HK City Sightseeing Service Counter or online ticketing site.

Unlimited Hop On Hop Off Pass
Pass	Price	Validity	Coverage			
Pass	Price	Validity	Open Top Bus Route H1/H1S/H2/H3/H4	Open Top Bus Route H2K	Citybus Urban Bus Service	Citybus Airport and Lantau Bus Service*
Open Top Bus Day Pass	Adult: HK$250 Child/Elder: HK$125	24 hours	Covered	Covered		
Open Top Bus Night Pass	Adult: HK$114 Child/Elder: HK$157	On the same Day		Covered		
Citybus+ Dayrider	HK$198	24 hours	Covered	Covered	Covered	Covered
Citybus+ Explorer	HK$320	48 hours	Covered	Covered	Covered	
Citybus+ Voyager	HK$400	36 hours	Covered	Covered	Covered	Covered

*Cityflyer Airport and Lantau bus routes, HZMB bus routes and Disneyland bus routes. Route prefix starting with A, E, NA, S, B5, R8, X1, N11, N21, N21A, N23, N26 and N29
