= Land reclamation in Hong Kong =

Reclamation of land

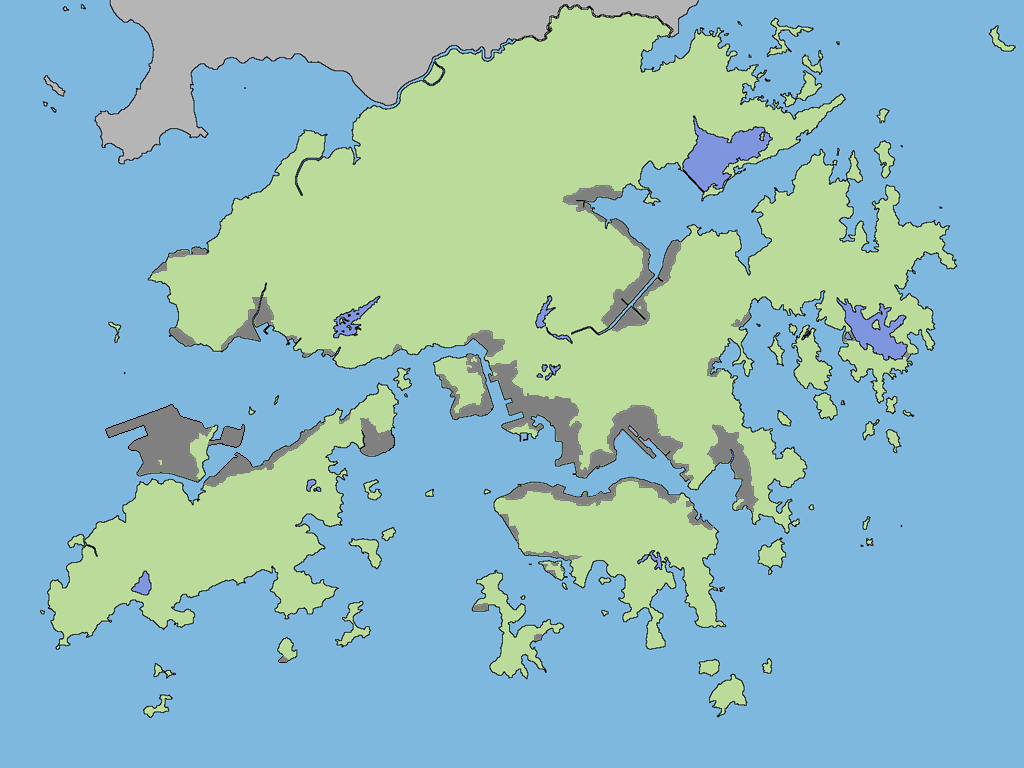
Land reclamation (grey areas) in Hong Kong. Note that most of the urban areas (shown in pink in the map below) of Hong Kong are located on reclaimed land.

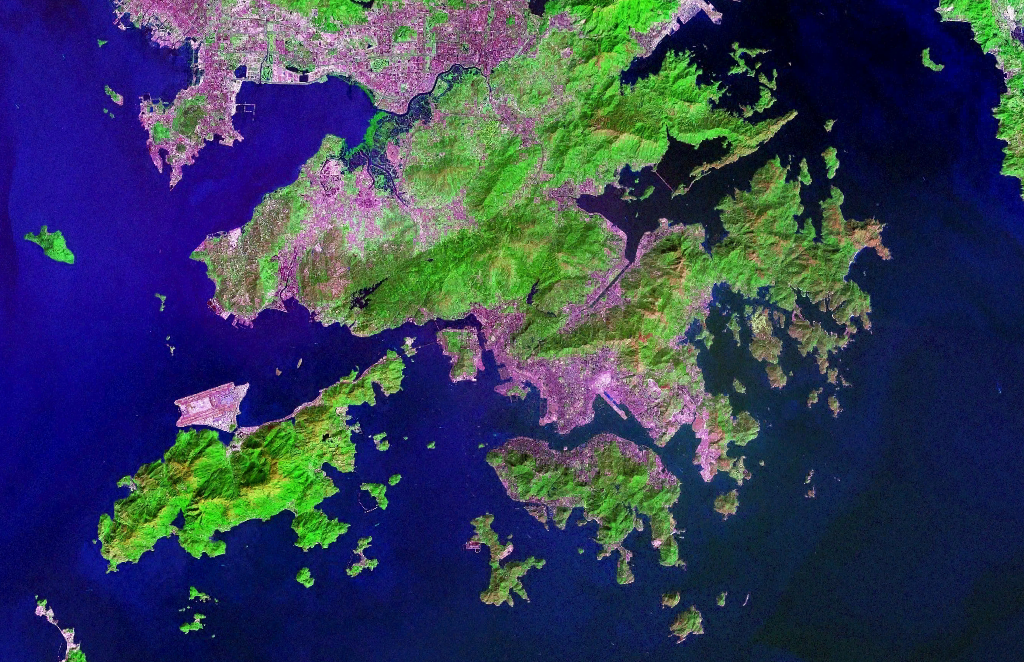

The land reclamation from the ocean has long been used in mountainous Hong Kong to expand the limited supply of usable land in the territory. The first reclamations can be traced back to the early Western Han dynasty (206 BC – 9 AD), when beaches were turned into fields for salt production. Major land reclamation projects have been conducted since the mid-19th century. By 2016, a total of 69.54 square kilometres (around 26.85 square miles) of land had been created through the process, approximately 7% of total land area. However, the scale of land reclamation has dropped in past years, amidst increasing concerns of private land developers controlling land supply in an already space-starved city.

== Projects ==
=== Bonham Strand (1842–1852) ===
In 1851, a fire broke out on the north side of Queen's Road Central, burning down many buildings along the coast. To clear the large amount of rubble which resulted from the fire, the Government decided to submerge it into Victoria Harbour, and reclaim the land along the shoreline to create a new road. Land reclamation works were completed in 1852, and the new road was named Bonham Strand after Sir George Bonham, 3rd Governor of Hong Kong.

=== Praya Reclamation Scheme (1868–1904) ===
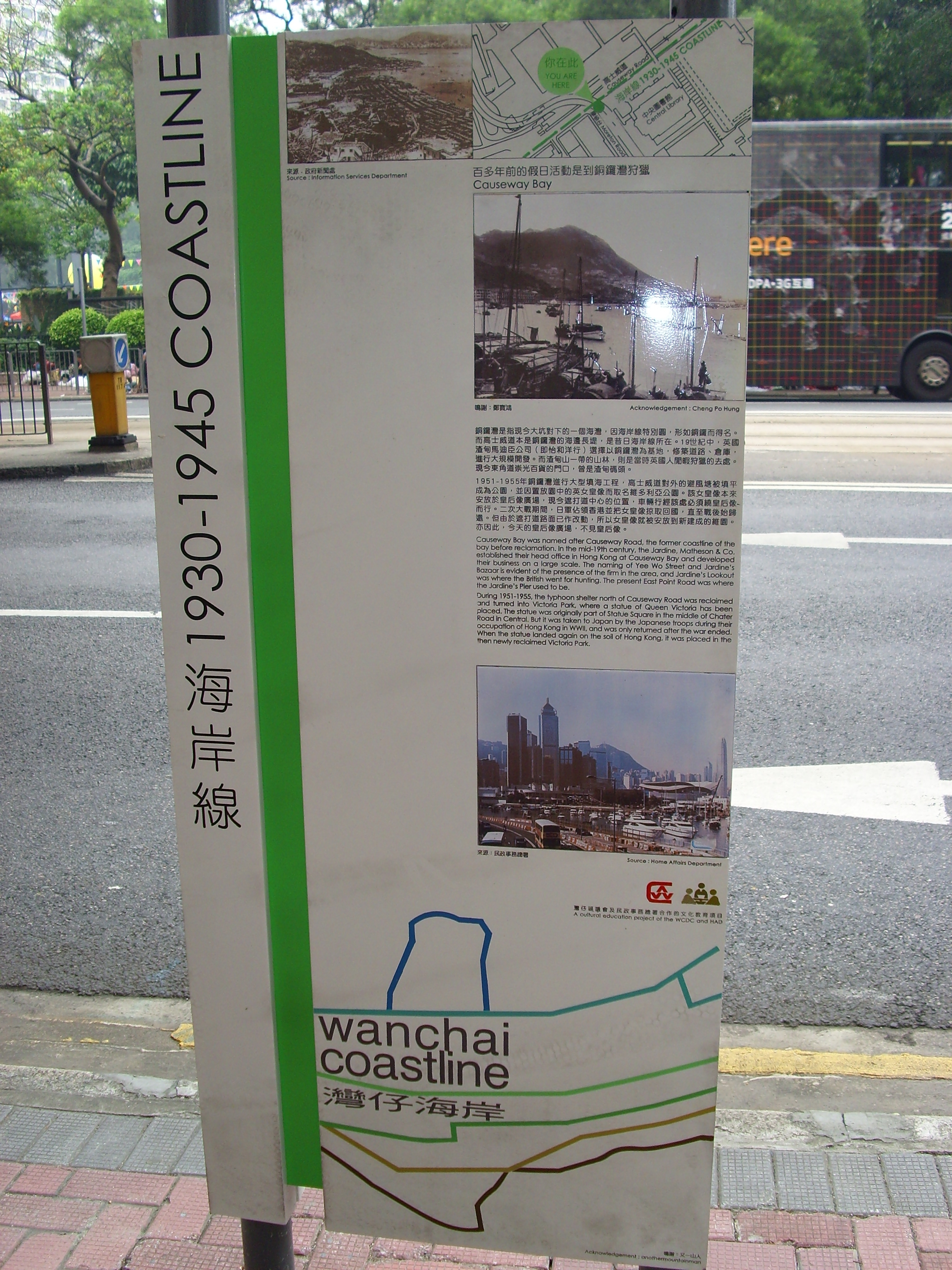
Marker in Causeway Bay showing the former location of the coastline

Completed in two phases, this was one of the most ambitious projects ever undertaken during the colonial era of Hong Kong. The first phase (1868-73) significantly expanded the land around Praya Central, which later became today's Des Voeux Road. The second phase took 14 years to complete (1890-1904), and added an estimated 59–65 acres (24–26 ha) of land to the coastline in the Central District.

=== Yau Ma Tei Reclamations (1880s, 1900–1904) ===
The Yau Ma Tei Reclamations were also carried out in two phases. The first phase commenced in the 1880s, and pushed the coastline from Shanghai Street to Reclamation Street. The hill near what is today Austin Road was flattened, allowing for Nathan Road to be extended through Yau Ma Tei.

The second phase took place between 1900 and 1904, and pushed the coastline from Reclamation Street to today's Ferry Street, between Jordan Road and Mong Kok Road. Most of today's Mong Kok and Yau Ma Tei west of Nathan Road was reclaimed in this way. Following completion of the works, Yau Ma Tei became Hong Kong's commercial hub, and Shanghai Street the most bustling street in the area.

=== Kai Tak Airport extension (1957–1974) ===
A section of runway, and most parking stands, were built on reclaimed land.

=== New towns, phases 1–3 (1973–1996) ===
Starting in the 1950s, an influx of migrants from mainland China led to the creation of the New Town Development Programme in 1973. This proposal aimed to address housing concerns from this sudden increase in population and decentralise urban areas. The new towns, such as Tuen Mun, Tai Po, Sha Tin, Ma On Shan, West Kowloon, Kwun Tong and Tseung Kwan O, were largely built on reclaimed land. They were built in three phases over the course of four decades, providing houses for about 47% of the local population as of 2016.

=== New International Airport construction (1991–1998) ===
Chek Lap Kok International airport was built on two islands, and was opened in 1998. Land was reclaimed to build a third runway, and to extend the current Terminal 2.

=== Central and Wan Chai projects (1993–2018) ===
Several land reclamation projects commenced in and around Victoria Harbour during this time. This includes transportation improvements such as the Hong Kong MTR station, Airport Express railway, and the Central-Wanchai Bypass, as well as public recreation spaces such as the Central Harbourfront Event Space, Tamar Park, and the Hong Kong Observation Wheel.

=== Hong Kong-Zhuhai-Macau Bridge (2009–2018) ===
Route of the HKZM bridge

The project involved the creation of four artificial islands, including one in Hong Kong.

=== Tung Chung New Town Extension (2017–2025) ===
Currently under construction, it is an eastern expansion of Tung Chung on the north shore of Lantau Island.

=== Hong Kong International Airport Third Runway (2016–2024) ===
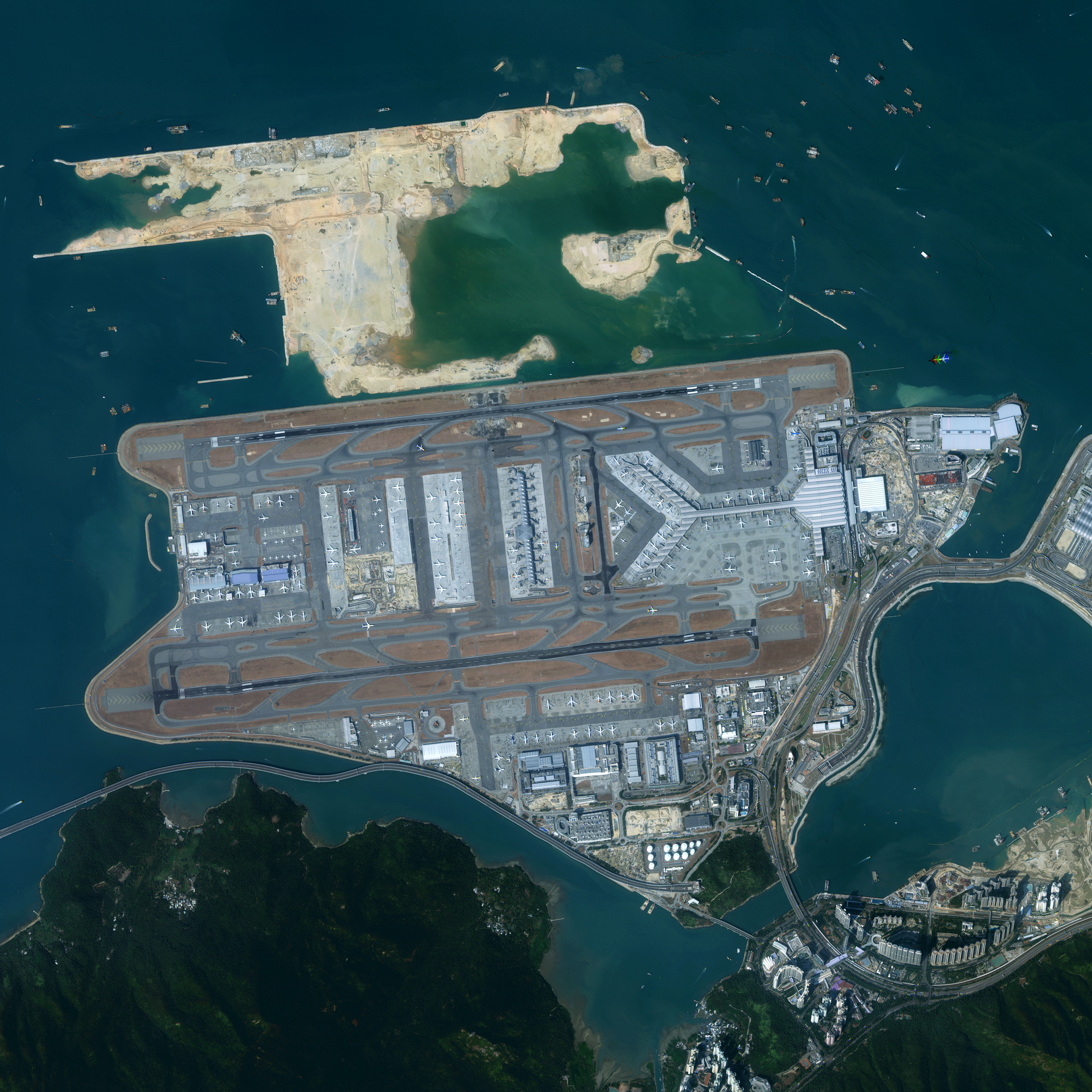
Aerial view of Hong Kong International Airport during the reclamation work of the Third Runway.

The third runway, and the extension of Terminal 2, in Hong Kong International Airport is built on reclaimed land.

=== Lantau Tomorrow Vision (planned) ===
In October 2018, a development project was announced with the intention of creating 1,700 hectares (4,200 acres) of land in the form of new islands off the east coast of Lantau, to house an estimated 1.1 million people. The project is expected to cost HK$500 billion.

== Issues ==
Much reclamation has taken place in prime locations on the waterfront on both sides of Victoria Harbour. This has raised issues concerning the protection of the harbour – which was once the source of Hong Kong's prosperity – traffic congestion in the Central district, as well as the collusion of the Hong Kong Government with real estate developers in the territory. However, land reclamation has been part of an ongoing scarcity of land in Hong Kong. The new towns developed upon the reclaimed land have seen private developers acquiring agricultural land and impacting the rural population.

== Environmental legislation ==
Hong Kong legislators passed the Protection of the Harbour Ordinance in 1996 in an effort to safeguard the increasingly threatened Victoria Harbour against encroaching land development. In a judicial review in January 2004, the Court of Final Appeal stipulated an "overriding public need" test which the government must adhere to in order to carry out further land reclamation projects in Victoria Harbour.

== Gallery ==
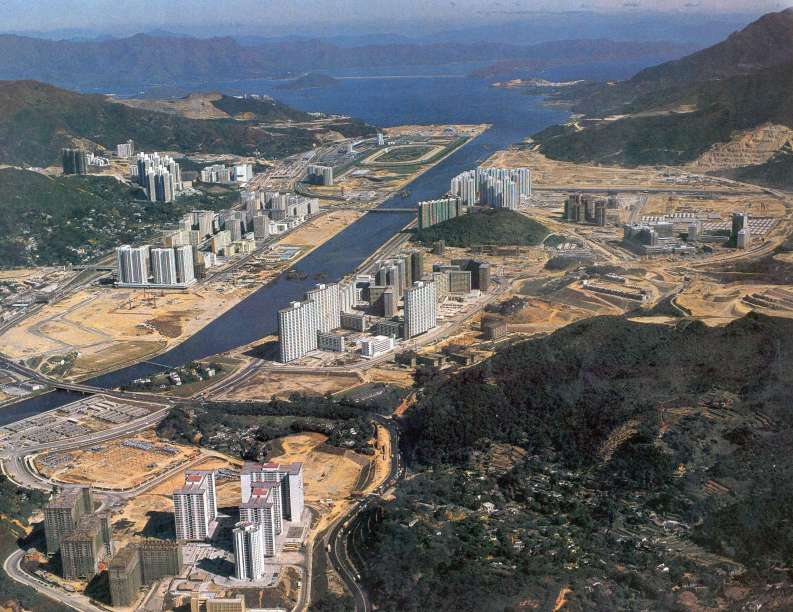
Sha Tin New Town under development in the 1980s

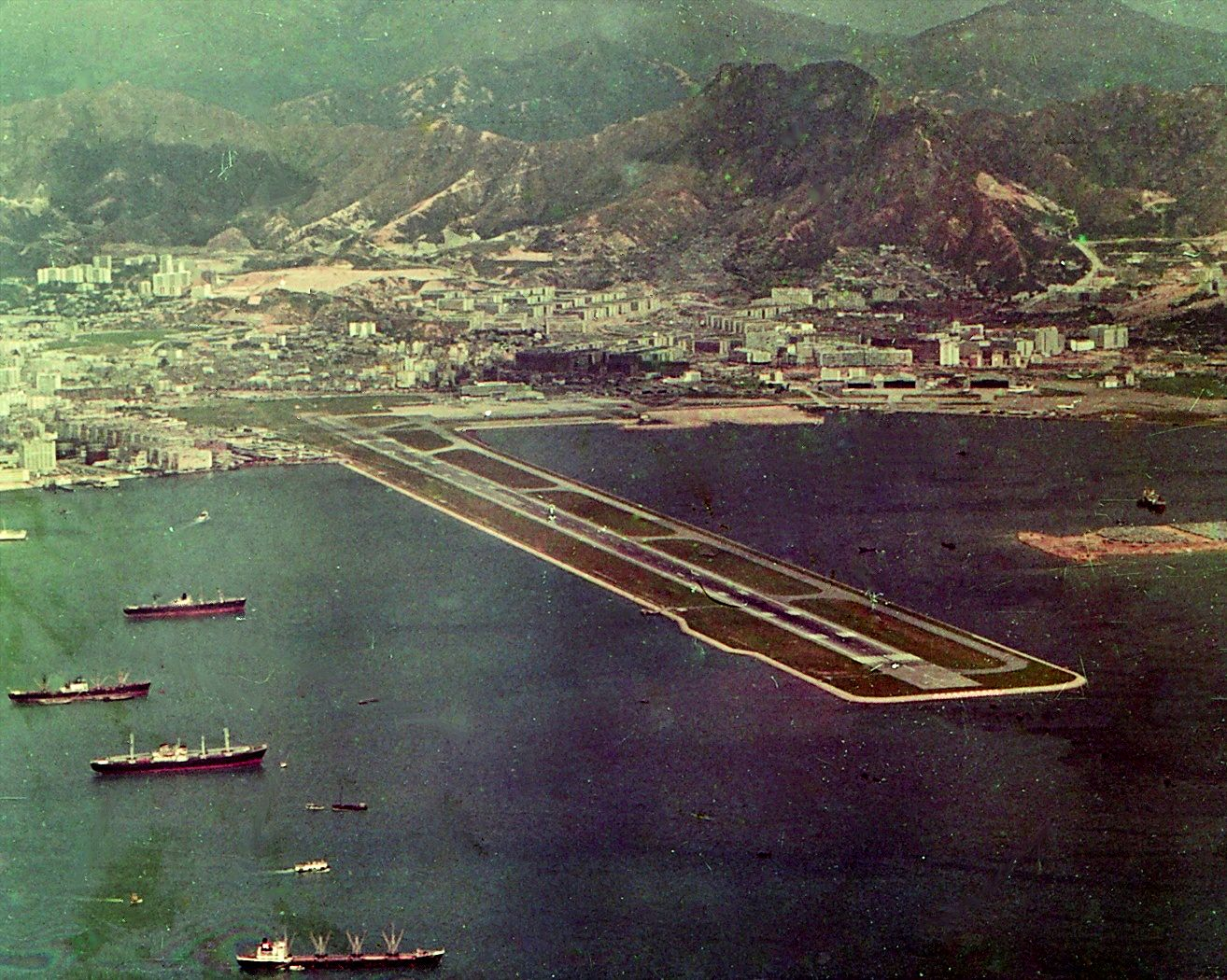
Kai Tak Airport in the 1970s, before more reclamation work was undertaken

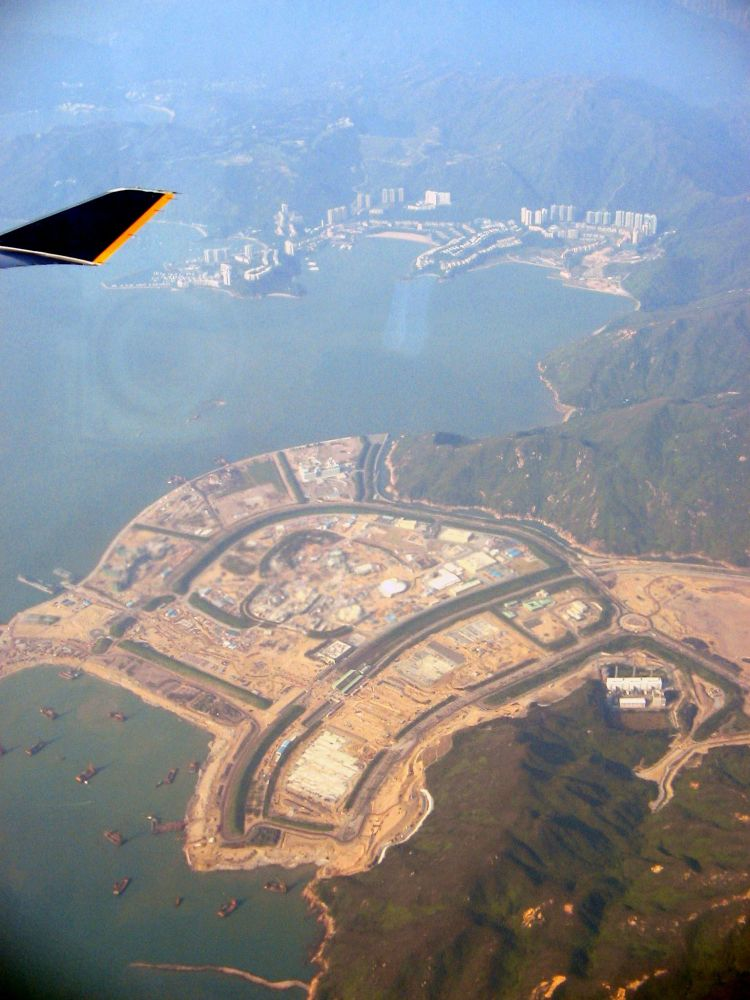
Hong Kong Disneyland Resort under construction (October 2004)

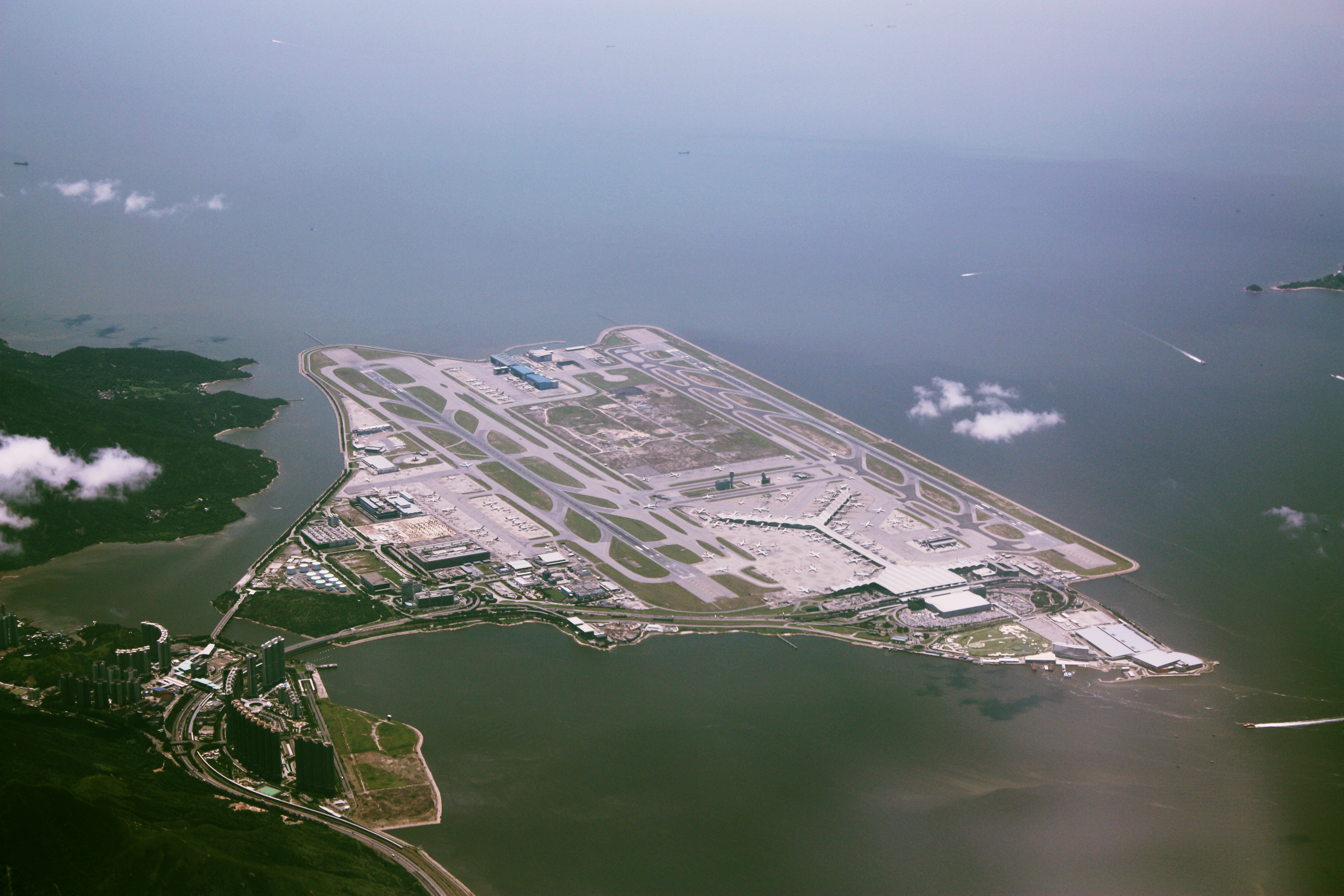
The airport platform of Hong Kong International Airport in 2010

== See also ==
- Land reclamation in China
- Society for Protection of the Harbour
- Land reclamation in Monaco
- Land reclamation in the United Arab Emirates
- Land reclamation in Singapore
