= Winston Chu =

Winston Chu Ka-sun (徐嘉慎; born 1940) is a Hong Kong lawyer and activist.

== Early years and education ==
Chu was born in Hong Kong and received his secondary school education at St. Louis School. Afterwards, he pursued further studies in the United Kingdom. Although he initially aspired to a career as a nuclear physicist, but instead ended up studying law. He graduated from University College London with a Bachelor of Laws degree and became a solicitor. Chu was also an honorary law lecturer in the Faculty of Law at the University of Hong Kong. He served on the Town Planning Board from 1988 to 1996.

== Society for Protection of the Harbour ==
In 1994, Winston Chu founded the Society for Protection of the Harbour to preserve Victoria Harbour. From that time onwards, he worked together with his partner Christine Loh to protect the harbour. On 11 October 2003, Winston Chu announced his resignation as Chairperson of SPH due to personal threats to his family and was replaced by Loh.
