= Protection of the Harbour Ordinance =

Legislation of Hong Kong

Legislative Council of Hong Kong
- Long title: An Ordinance to protect and preserve the harbour as a special public asset and a natural heritage of Hong Kong by regulating reclamations in the harbour.
- Citation: Cap. 531
- Enacted by: Legislative Council of Hong Kong
- Commenced: 30 June 1997

Legislative history
- Introduced by: Hon Christine Loh Kung-wai
- Introduced: 22 November 1996
- First reading: 4 December 1996
- Second reading: 27 June 1997
- Third reading: 27 June 1997

Amended by
- 1999; 2025
- Status: Amended

Protection of the Harbour Ordinance
- Traditional Chinese: 保護海港條例
- Simplified Chinese: 保护海港条例
Transcriptions
Standard Mandarin
- Hanyu Pinyin: Bǎohù Hǎigǎng Tiáolì
Yue: Cantonese
- Jyutping: bou2 wu6 hoi2 gong2 tiu4 lai6

The Protection of the Harbour Ordinance, Cap. 531 (Chinese: 保護海港條例) is an ordinance in Hong Kong Law that aims to limit land reclamation in the surviving waters of Victoria Harbour.

== Content ==
In section 3, the ordinance states that:

- "The harbour is to be protected and preserved as a special public asset and a natural heritage of the Hong Kong people and, for that purpose, there shall be a presumption against reclamation in the harbour."
- "All public officers and public bodies shall have regard to the principle stated in subsection (1) for guidance in the exercise of any powers vested in them."

== History ==
The ordinance was proposed by the Society for Protection of the Harbour in 1996 and presented to the Legislative Council by Christine Loh. The bill was passed on 27 June 1997 and applied to the area of the harbour around Central, Hong Kong. On 3 November 1999, the Secretary for Planning, Environment and Lands moved for an amendment to the ordinance, which extended it to the entire area of Victoria Harbour as defined by Schedule 3 of the Interpretation and General Clauses Ordinance (Cap. 1).

=== Reclamation controversy and judicial review ===
The Government proposed the Central and Wan Chai Reclamation project in the 1980s, long before the inception of the ordinance. When the ordinance was passed, the first phases for Central and Wan Chai were already near completion. The ordinance does not affect those projects, however, since Section 4 permits grandfathering of projects authorized prior to the ordinances commencement. However, when the Government later planned to start the remaining phases of the reclamation, conservationists saw the ordinance as a means to stop the projects.

The Society for Protection of the Harbour applied for a stay of order and judicial review on September 25, 2003, prohibiting the government from continuing the third phase of the Central reclamation project.

The SPH requested judicial reviews on 27 February 2003 and 25 September 2003, respectively. On 6 October 2003, the High Court rejected the Society's bid to provisionally halt work. Thus, the Government proceeded with its work to fill 230,000 square metres (2,500,000 sq ft) of the harbour.

On 1 September 2004, the Court of Final Appeal rejected the Town Planning Board's proposal on the draft Wan Chai North Outline Zoning Plan (OZP); further, the Wan Chai Development Phase 2 had to be reviewed.

=== The three tests ===
On 8 July 2003, Madam Justice Chu of the High Court laid down three tests for the presumptions outlined in Section 3.1 of the ordinance, which were:

- Compelling, overriding and present need
- No viable alternative
- Minimum impairment

The tests are carried out on a per-case basis, on the project-in-question's purpose and extent. Thus, the Government and those concerned often cite the three tests to justify (or deny) reclamation projects that are being planned.
