= Hong Kong Observation Wheel =

Ferris wheel in Hong Kong

Coordinates: 22.2853°N 114.1617°E

- 香港摩天輪

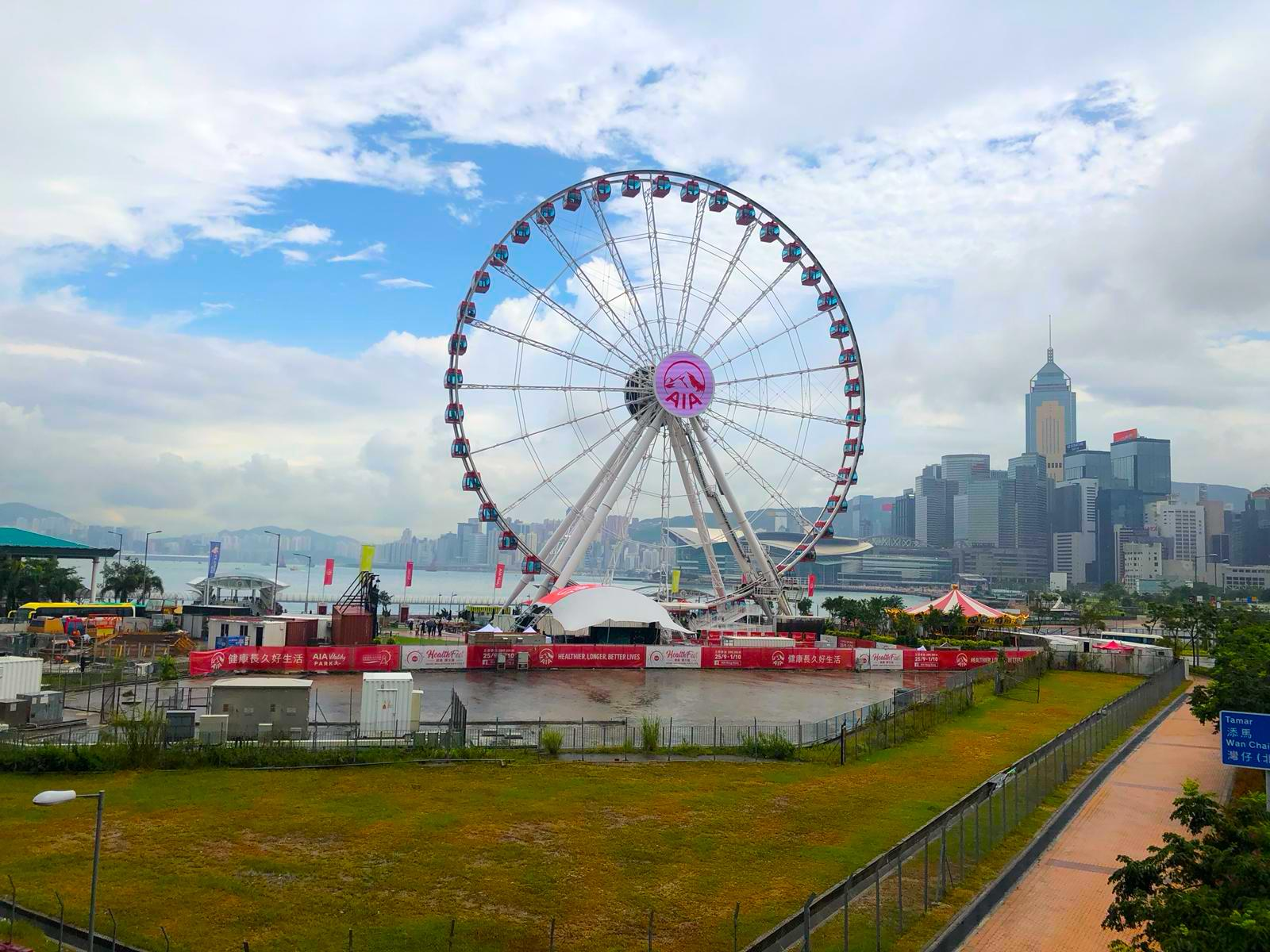
- Hong Kong Observation Wheel in September 2018

General information
- Status: Completed
- Type: Ferris wheel
- Location: 33 Man Kwong Street, Central, Hong Kong
- Construction started: May 2014
- Construction stopped: September 2014
- Opened: 5 December 2014 (grand opening to public)
- Cost: HK$250 million (entire installation and transportation)
- Owner: 2015–2017: Swiss AEX; 2017–present: The Entertainment Corporation Limited

Height
- Height: 60 metres (197 ft)

Website
- hkow.hk

The Hong Kong Observation Wheel (abbr. HKOW) is a 60-metre (197-foot) tall Ferris wheel located at the Central Harbourfront, Central, Hong Kong. It has 42 gondolas, including one VIP Gondola with leather seats and a clear glass bottom floor. All gondolas are equipped with air conditioners and communication systems. Each ride includes two to three rotations and takes about 15 minutes. Each gondola seats a maximum of eight people, other than the VIP Gondola, which seats five people.

It is currently operated by The Entertainment Corporation Limited (TECL) which partners with AIA Group to operate the adjacent AIA Vitality Park.

== Background ==
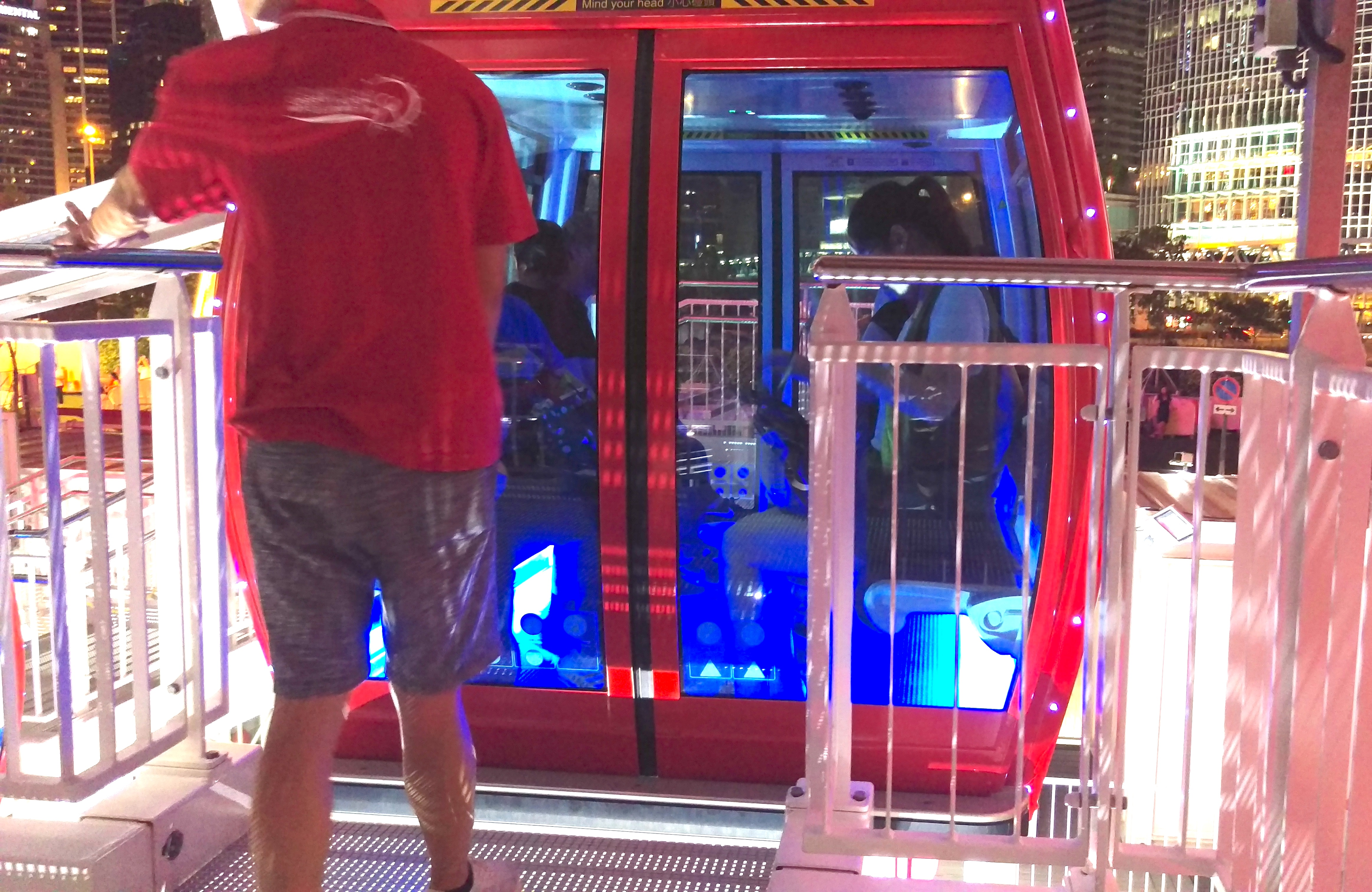
The gondola of the wheel in July 2018

In May 2013 the Lands Department of Hong Kong leased 9,620 square metres (103,548 square feet) of land between Central Pier No. 9 and Pier No. 10. for the attraction. It is situated on the Central and Wan Chai Reclamation overlooking Victoria Harbour in Hong Kong. 90% of the site surrounding the wheel is accessible to the public, with food and beverages available for purchase. Live entertainments are also held at the event plaza throughout the year, which is suitable for all ages. The wheel is designed to suit Hong Kong’s climate and weather. It is built within the Electrical and Mechanical Services Department and TUV standards.

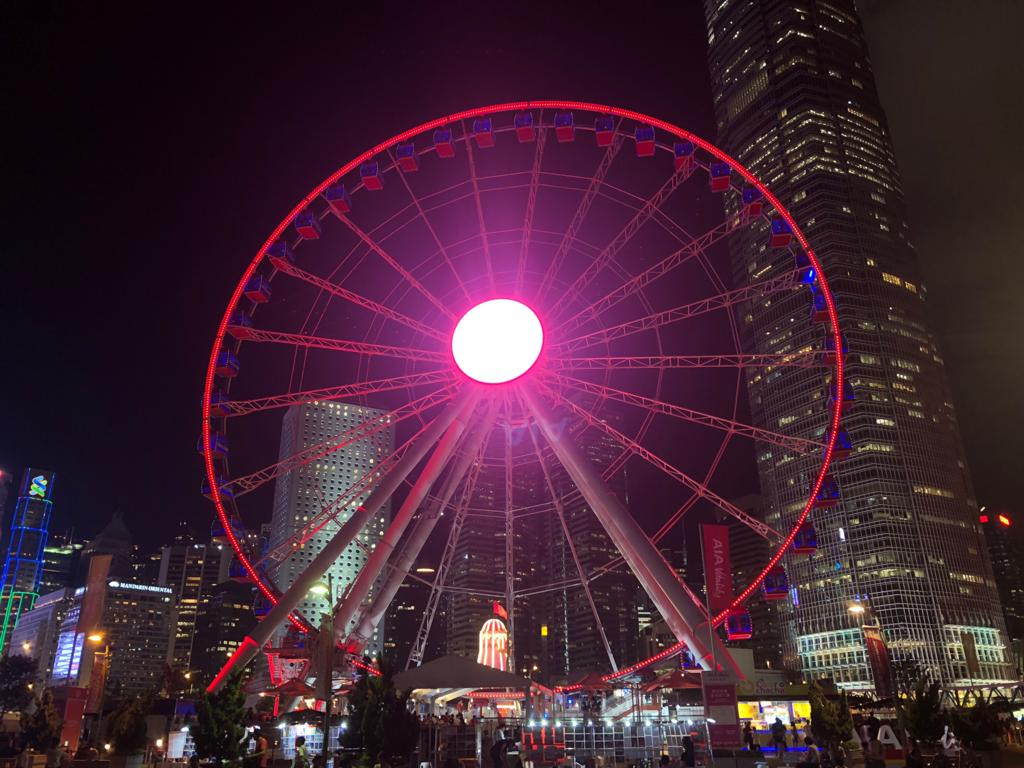
Hong Kong Observation Wheel at night, August 2018

The wheel has had two owners. The previous owner was Swiss AEX and the current owner is The Entertainment Corporation Limited (TECL). In 2014, Swiss AEX expected 1 million riders per annum which is approximately a daily average of 2,740 passengers. After the ownership transfer in 2017, TECL announced that they had achieved 1 million riders in less than 7 months since the reopening.

== Ownership ==
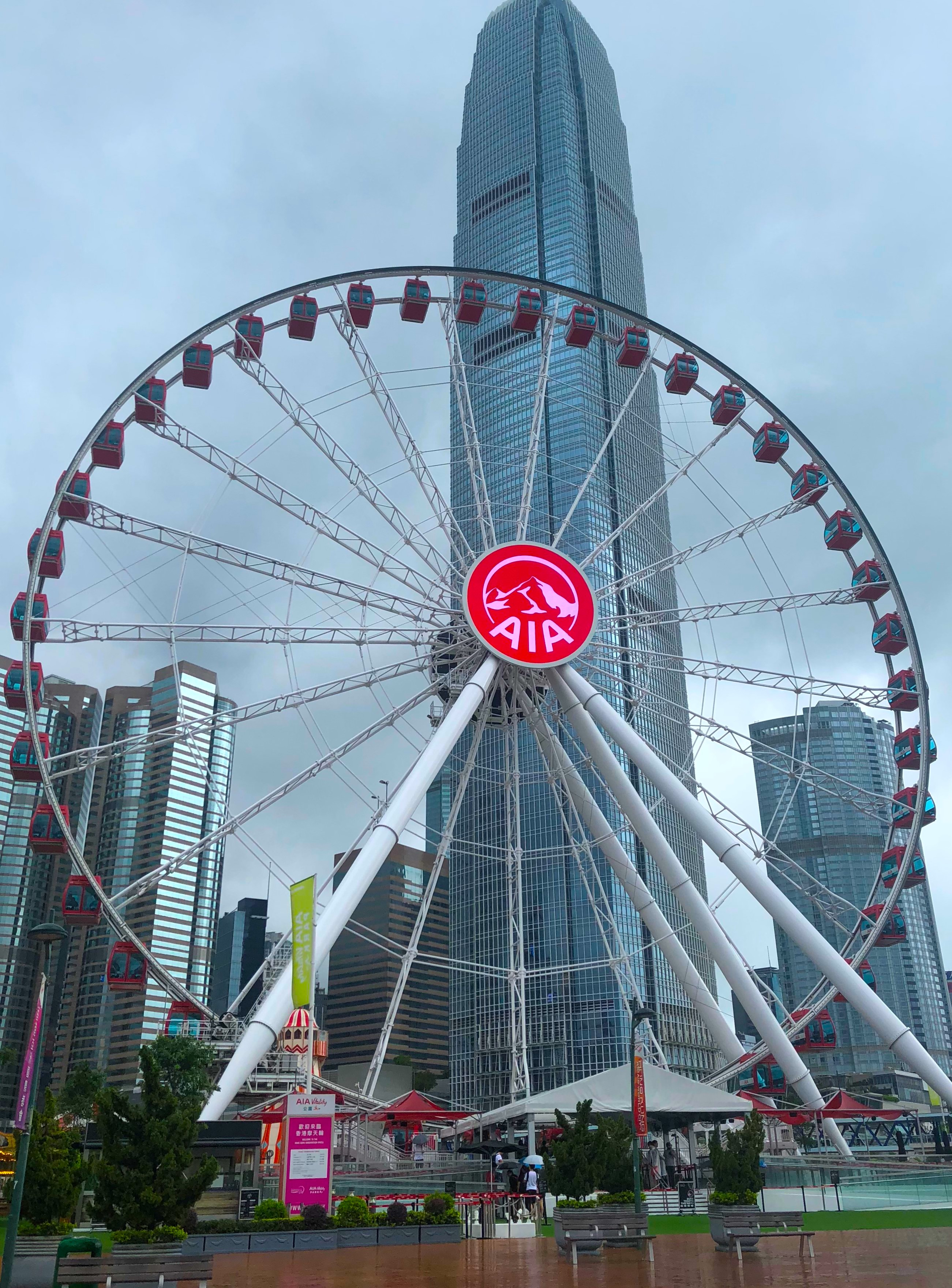
Front shot of the wheel, in front of The International Finance Centre

The HKOW was first proposed by Swiss AEX, a company who claims to have over a decade's experience in Ferris wheel operations in their proposal contract. Swiss AEX had partnered with Hong Kong Telecom (HKT) for this project.

In 2017, the government awarded the second term of the operating contract to The Entertainment Corporation Limited (TECL) which was set to commence in September 2017. TECL then issued a statement saying it will “offer a substantially lower ticket price per ride”. The wheel closed to the public in August when the dispute over transfer of its ownership resulted in a deadlock between the original and new operators. The Secretary for Development stated the wheel could be dismantled and closed for 2 years until a replacement is built by TECL. Swiss AEX, the former owner of the wheel, described the company “with no experience of operating observation wheels whatsoever”. On 6 September 2017, a deal was struck between TECL & Swiss AEX which saved the wheel from demolition.

In November 2017, TECL announced that the wheel would re-open to the public on 20 December 2017 as part of the new AIA Vitality Park, with a range of health and wellness-related events, attractions and activities nearby.

== Controversy ==
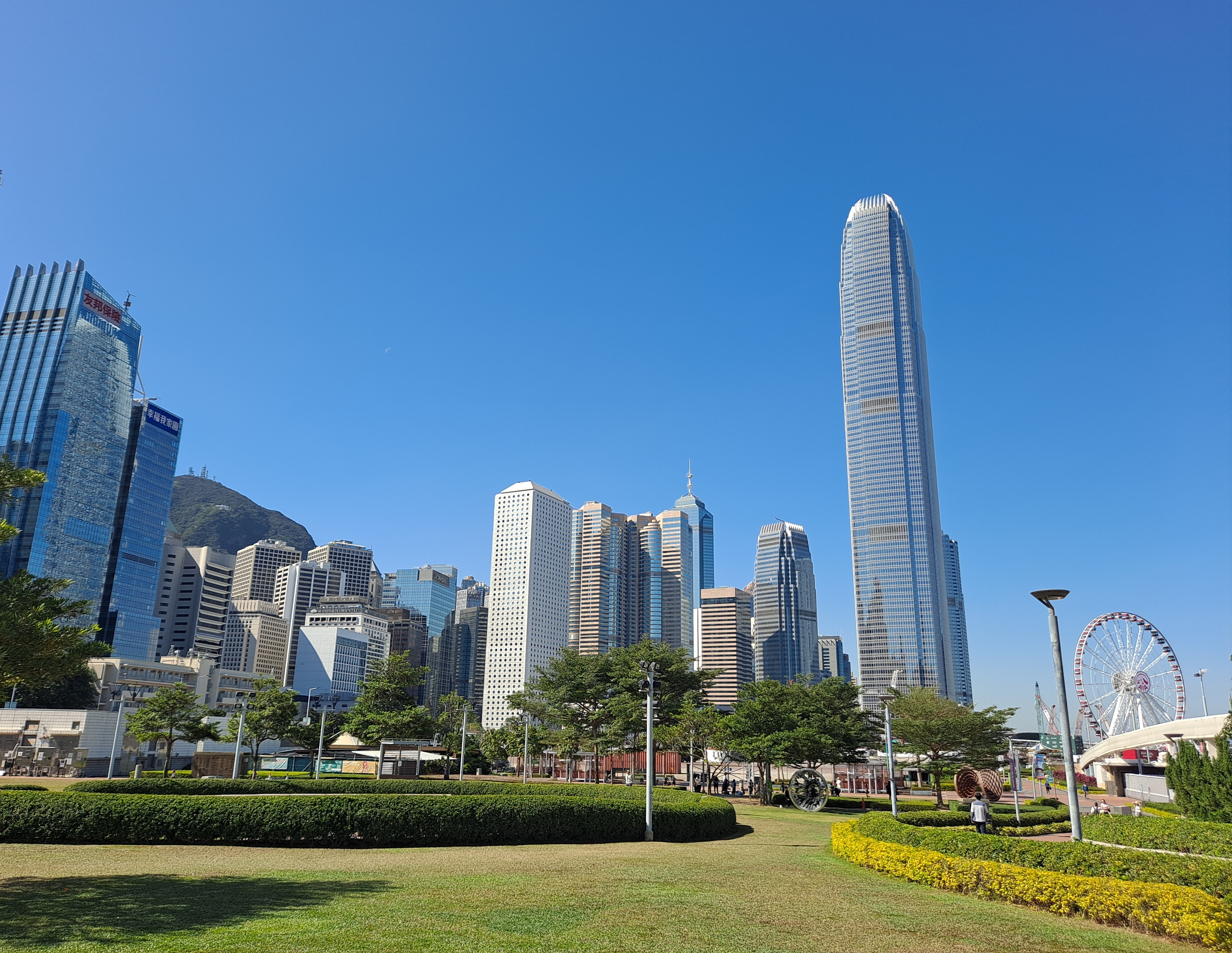
View of the Wheel (right) from Tamar Park

The government's decision to build a Ferris wheel at the location was controversial.

Some questioned the necessity of building such a tourist attraction, since the view is easily matched from the city's buildings and adjacent high land. The chairman of the Harbourfront Commission, Nicholas Brooke, showed support for the development project in an interview. However, the Harbourfront Commission has no executive power over the project.

The project has also been delayed several times: Although the operation contract was opened in 2013, the attraction was not opened until late 2014. There were also many complaints from the public about the lack of promotion and information.

Security has also been controversial after the release of a photo taken by one daredevil climber showing himself sitting on the top of the wheel. This picture was taken down before the opening day of the wheel to the public. It has brought the security concerns of wheel into the limelight.

== In popular culture ==
The wheel appeared in the 2021 monster film Godzilla vs. Kong, in which it was destroyed during a battle between Godzilla and Kong that also devastated much of the surrounding city. Its lighting was depicted as green in the film, instead of its usual red.

== See also ==
- Singapore Flyer
- Bay Glory, Shenzhen
