= Society for Protection of the Harbour =

- Type: Charity
- Industry: Environmental Protection
- Founded: November 1995
- Defunct: 2025
- Headquarters: Hong Kong
- Key people: Winston Ka Sun Chu (徐嘉慎); Christine Loh (陸恭蕙); Jennifer Chow (周潔冰)
- Website: harbourprotection.org

Society for Protection of the Harbour (SPH) (Chinese: 保護海港協會) was a Hong-Kong-based organisation founded in November 1995. It is a charitable, non-political and non-profit making green group. The objectives of the organisation are to protect the Victoria Harbour in Hong Kong from destruction caused by Government's excessive reclamation and improper development, and to arouse public aspirations for the harbour. To preserve the harbour, SPH has raised a number of objections on related Government policies, undertaken numerous conservation projects, suggested constructive urban planning along the waterfront and carried out public education on harbour protection.

The Society for Protection of the Harbour disbanded in August 2025 following amendments to the Protection of the Harbour Ordinance, which the group said undermined its ability to continue protecting Victoria Harbour.
