= Judicial review in Hong Kong =

Judicial review in Hong Kong is conducted according to the Constitutional and Administrative Law List (Practice Direction 26.1). It comprises two different aspects: firstly, judicial review of domestic ordinances as to their compatibility with the Basic Law ("constitutional review"); secondly, judicial review of administrative decisions under administrative law ("administrative review").

== Constitutional review ==
In Hong Kong, constitutional review came into existence at the dawn of the British era, when the Legislative Council was created under the Hong Kong Letters Patent in 1843. From that time onwards, the position has been one in which, as the judiciary stated in R v Ibrahim (1913) 8 HKLR 1 at 18, our legislature is supreme "subject to its constitution" and any enactment beyond the legislative power provided by the constitution would be pronounced bad.

The legislative power provided by the Letters Patent was to make laws for "peace, order and good government". The Judicial Committee of the Privy Council at the judicial apex of Hong Kong has always held that those words confer the widest possible law-making power. Therefore, until the advent of the Hong Kong Bill of Rights Ordinance in 1991 there was for all practical purposes little, if any, real scope for constitutional review in Hong Kong.

Under the Basic Law, the court of Hong Kong is also delegated with the power to interpret the Basic Law. Thus, it is recognised by the Hong Kong courts that they have jurisdiction to check whether the executive or legislature are working within the boundaries of the Basic Law. Similar to the United States, Hong Kong courts have held that they may review as to whether legislation passed by the legislature is in compliance with the Basic Law. This is different from the situation in the UK where the court may have no such jurisdiction under the traditional doctrine of parliamentary supremacy. The Hong Kong courts observed that reviewing legislation is possible because the legislature in Hong Kong is not, unlike its UK counterpart, supreme.

Article 39 of the Basic Law entrenches the International Covenant on Civil and Political Rights (ICCPR) as a core constitutional document for Hong Kong. No legal restrictions on the rights and freedoms of Hong Kong residents may contravene the ICCPR as applied to Hong Kong. The ICCPR applies to Hong Kong primarily through the Hong Kong Bill of Rights Ordinance (BORO), which was enacted in 1991. In fact, the BORO was the subject of many cases of judicial review before 1997. In particular, R v Sin Yau Ming, a 1992 case involving the presumption of innocence in the BORO, set the stage for future judicial review. With the advent of the Bill of Rights, which came into operation on 8 June 1991, the courts of Hong Kong embarked upon an era of meaningful constitutional review. The courts of Hong Kong produced a valuable if not very large body of human rights jurisprudence and gained a useful six years of pre-handover experience of meaningful constitutional review before the Basic Law came into force.

== Administrative review ==
The Basic Law provides that the previous law in force in Hong Kong, including Common Law, will be preserved. Thus, administrative review, as part of the Common Law, is also preserved. The basis of administrative review is sometimes said to be Article 35 of the Basic Law, which reads:

Hong Kong residents shall have the right to institute legal proceedings in the courts against the acts of the executive authorities and their personnel.

There is, however, debate on this. Hong Kong's administrative law has procedural and substantive similarities with English administrative law, but with various differences.

== Procedure ==
=== Leave to apply for judicial review ===
Before applying for judicial review, a person must first obtain the leave of the Court of First Instance of the High Court by filing Form 86 (together with an affidavit verifying the relevant facts and the filing fee of HK$1,045). As explained by the Court of Final Appeal, the requirement to obtain leave to apply for judicial review serves as 'an important filter ... to prevent public authorities from being unduly vexed with unarguable challenges'. An applicant must exhaust all revenues of appeal or alternative remedies before applying for leave for judicial review unless there are exceptional circumstances.

In Form 86, the grounds of judicial review must be set out 'clearly, succinctly and in a few numbered paragraphs' addressing the 'real issues in the case', together with the relevant facts. It is the duty of the applicant to include in Form 86 and the accompanying affidavit all material facts of which he/she is aware (even though such facts may be adverse to his/her case), as well as potential legal answers to his/her claim. If leave is granted, but the applicant has failed to comply with this duty of full and frank disclosure, it is viewed as a 'serious matter' by the Court (even if it is an 'inadvertent' oversight) and leave may be set aside. In addition, a legally-aided applicant may be ordered to personally bear all of his/her own legal costs, as well as the respondent's legal costs.

Form 86 must generally be filed promptly and in any event no later than 3 months from the date of the decision which is being challenged. If this deadline is missed, a Judge of the Court of First Instance may exercise his/her discretion to grant an extension of time if there is a 'good reason'.

A Judge of the Court of First Instance will grant leave to apply for judicial review if the judge is persuaded that there is a reasonably arguable claim which has a realistic prospect of success. The Judge will usually make the decision without an oral hearing. If an oral hearing is scheduled, the Judge should not dismiss an application for leave for judicial review on the ground of 'want of prosecution' (i.e. the applicant has no intention to pursue his/her application) merely because of a single failure by the applicant to appear at the oral hearing. The Judge should continue to consider the merits of the application for leave.

The Judge will record on Form CALL-1 whether leave to apply for judicial review has been granted or refused. If leave is refused, the Judge is not required to state elaborate reasons on Form CALL-1. An appeal can be lodged to the Court of Appeal within 14 days of the decision of the Court of First Instance to refuse leave. The appellant should file with the Court of Appeal a notice of appeal, Form CALL-1, the order/judgment of the Court of First Instance and all the documents placed before the Judge of the Court of First Instance. If the appellant wishes to make submissions, they should be contained in a skeleton argument (not an affidavit) submitted with the appeal bundle. If the 14-day deadline to lodge an appeal is missed, an application for extension of time can be made directly to the Court of Appeal, which can decide without an oral hearing whether to exercise its discretionary power to extend time to lodge an appeal.

=== Application for judicial review ===
If leave to apply for judicial review has been granted, the applicant must, within 14 days, serve the order granting leave and any directions from the Court on the respondent and interested parties. In addition, the applicant must file Form 86A in Court (together with the filing fee of HK$1,045) and serve it on 'all persons directly affected'.

If the respondent intends to use an affidavit at the hearing, it must be filed as soon as practicable and in any event no later than 56 days after the applicant has served Form 86A on it.

An applicant or interested party who proposes to make submissions in support of the application for judicial review must submit a skeleton argument at least 7 clear days before the substantive hearing; a respondent or interested party who proposes to make submissions in opposition to the application for judicial review must submit a skeleton argument at least 3 clear days before the substantive hearing.

An applicant for judicial review should 'put all the cards on the table' by 'exhausting all the grounds and materials the applicant intends to rely upon' at the substantive hearing before the Court of First Instance, as he/she will not be able to raise new grounds and place new materials if an appeal against the judgment of the Court of First Instance is made to the Court of Appeal unless there is a reason of 'exceptional public importance'.

== Controversy ==
On 3 December 2015, Henry Litton, a retired judge who sat on the Court of Final Appeal, caused controversy by his claim that the system of judicial review had been "abused". "Judicial review is not available for challenges to government policy," he said. "That is a fundamental rule in the separation of powers. The court is concerned with law, not policy." Litton also criticized the way judges dealt with judicial review cases.

Shortly afterwards, Winnie Tam, chair of the Bar Association, told the media that not every unsuccessful case of judicial review represented an abuse of the system.

On 14 December, government spokesman Andrew Fung questioned the neutrality of barristers who disagreed with Litton. He suggested that there may be a conflict of interest, since some barristers profit from judicial review cases. He also complained of the costs incurred by delay caused by judicial review.

On the same day, former chief justice Andrew Li wrote in an op-ed that "the pursuit of efficiency must not be at the expense of justice." He believed that Litton's criticism of judges was unjustified.

On 12 January 2016, Chief Executive Leung Chun-ying told reporters that while judicial reviews are provided for under Hong Kong's legal system and serve to monitor the Government's work, the judicial review system is sometimes abused.

Chief Justice Geoffrey Ma also defended the system against attacks on its inconvenience. "Although there may occasionally be inconveniences, judicial review overall serves the public interest and facilitates the well-being of our society," he said in his speech at the Ceremonial Opening of the Legal Year 2016. "This status should properly be recognised."
