= Peak Road =

Road in Hong Kong

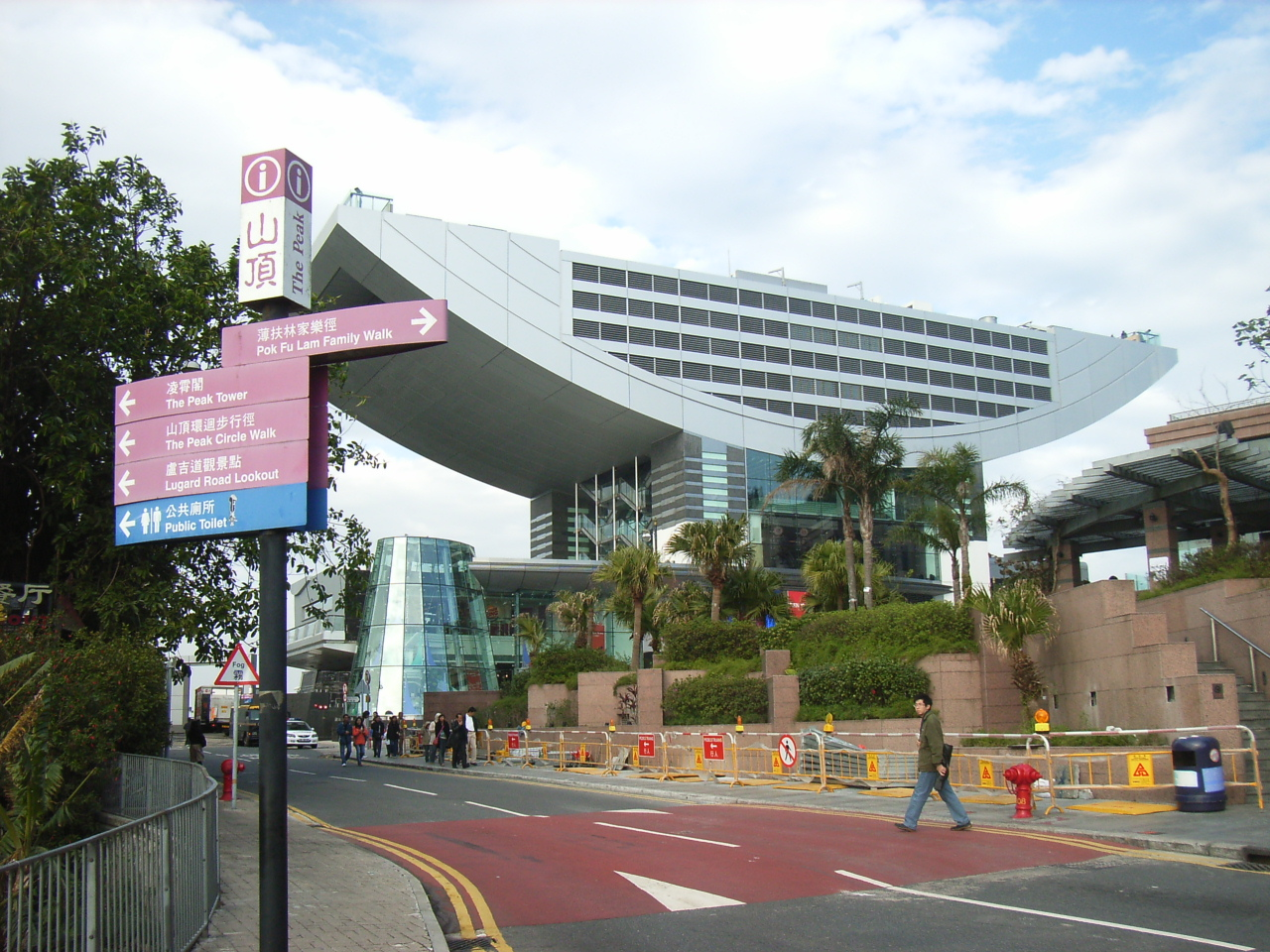
- The Peak Tower as seen from the start of the Pok Fu Lam Reservoir trail
- Interactive map of Peak Road
- Native name: 山頂道 (Yue Chinese)
- Location: The Peak, Hong Kong

Peak Road
- Traditional Chinese: 山頂道
Transcriptions
Yue: Cantonese
- Yale Romanization: Shān dǐng dào

Peak Road (Chinese: 山頂道; Jyutping: saan1 ding2 dou6) is a two-way road near the summit of The Peak on Hong Kong Island; its highest altitude is approximately 420 metres (1,378 ft). It is the only thoroughfare connecting Victoria Gap with Wan Chai Gap.

== Location ==
The Peak Road starts west of The Peak Tower and The Peak Galleria, and east of The Peak Lookout; specifically at the junction with Harlech Road, Mount Austin Road, Lugard Road, Old Peak Road, and Findlay Road. It descends in a southeasterly direction, passing (and running parallel to) Plunkett's Road, before crossing Mount Kellett Road, after which it forks with Gough Hill Path, followed by another fork with Bluff Path, and another with Gough Hill Road, whence it continues snaking southeast, before beginning to descend in a northeasterly direction towards the junction with Barker Road and Guildford Road (passing Craigmin Road along the way) where it then intersects with Coombe Road and Magazine Gap Road. From there, it continues heading northeast, before changing direction to southeast, where it then ends at the junction with Stubbs Road and Middle Gap Road in Wan Chai Gap.

== History ==
Opened to traffic in 1923, Peak Road originally referred to the current Old Peak Road which connects Central with the The Peak. Both roads were renamed on 1 September 1960 when the section of Stubbs Road connecting The Peak with Wan Chai Gap became the new Peak Road.

=== Landslides ===
On 17 June 1983, a landslide occurred on the Peak Road during torrential rain, causing a section of road several dozen metres long to collapse. A taxi passing through the area rolled down the hillside as a result. Neither the driver nor the two passengers were injured. The Peak Road was closed for a week afterwards.

On 5 November 2021, at the junction of Peak Road and Coombe Road, a freshwater pipe burst, causing a large volume of water to gush out, resulting a landslide to form on a slope which was 30 metres (98 feet) high, and 100 metres (328 feet) wide. No one was injured. The police implemented single-lane two-way traffic control systems on the sections of the Peak Road between Barker Road and Mount Davis Road, and Coombe Road and Mount Davis Road. These measures remained in place until 19 November 2021.

== See also ==
- List of streets and roads in Hong Kong
