= Mount Austin Playground =

Park in Hong Kong

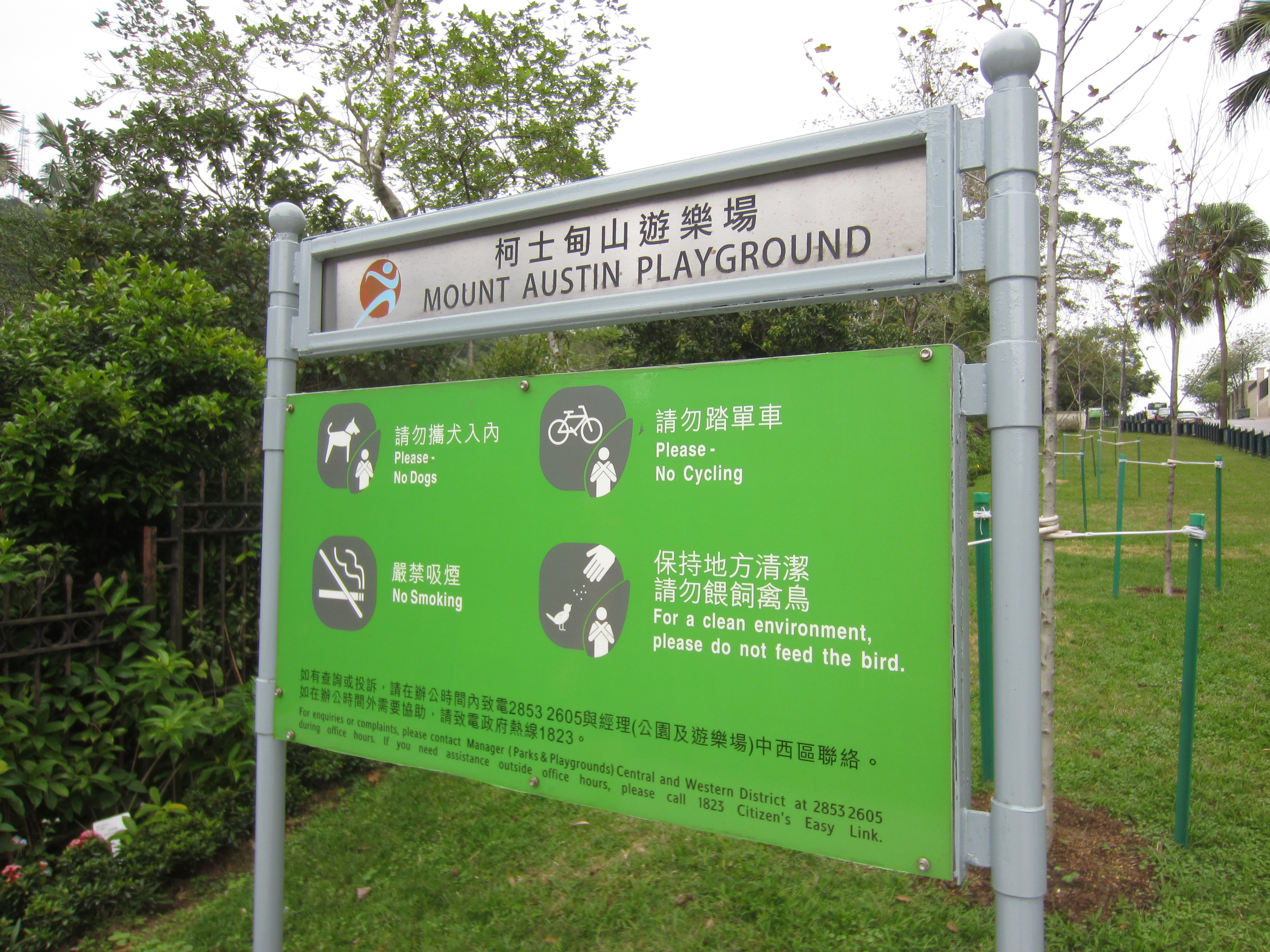
- Signage for the playground, 2017
- Interactive map of Mount Austin Playground
- Type: Park and playground
- Location: Victoria Peak, Hong Kong
- Coordinates: 22.272675°N 114.147395°E

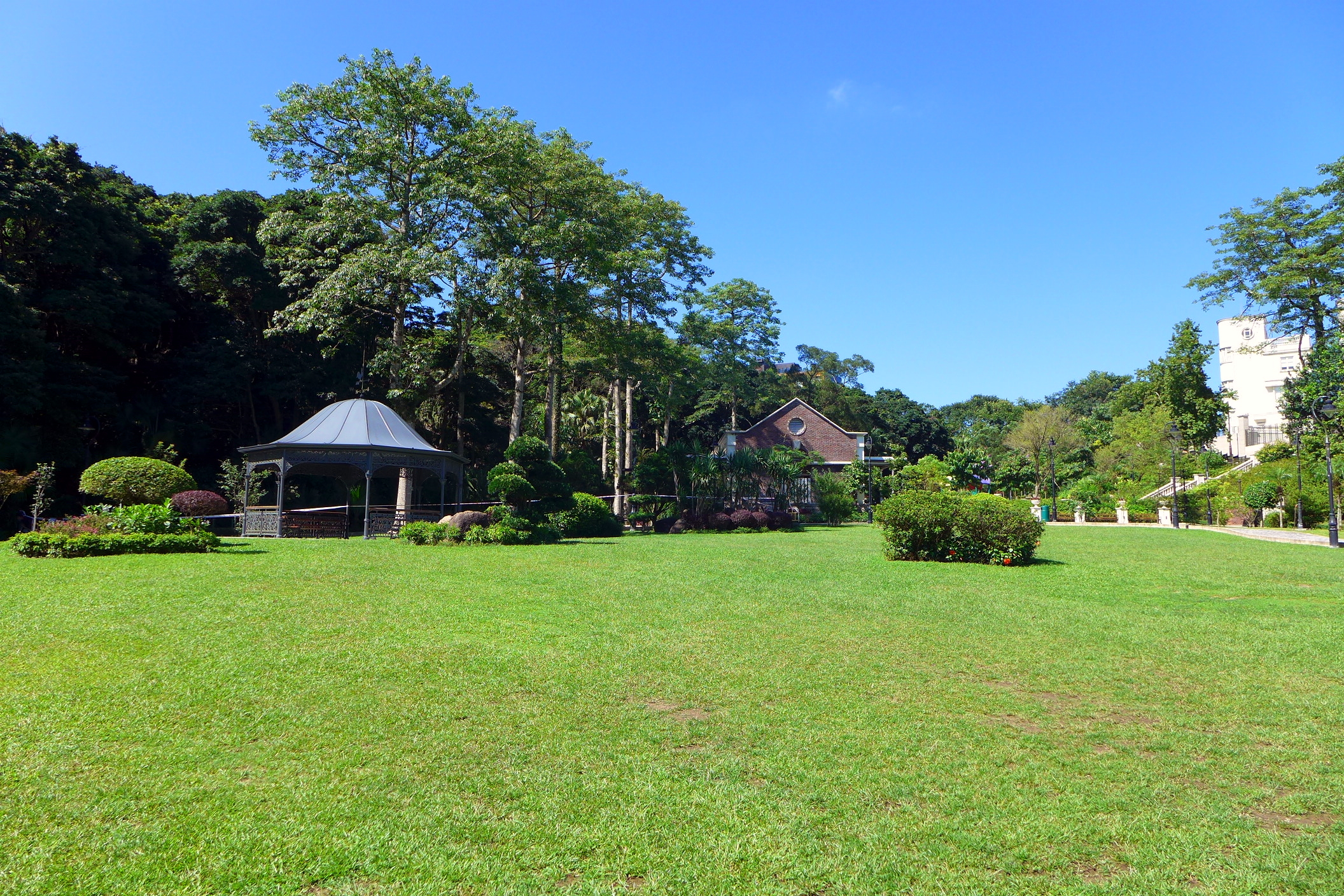
Mount Austin Playground lawn

Mount Austin Playground is a park and playground along Mount Austin Road, at Victoria Peak, Hong Kong.
