= Victoria Gap =

Mountain pass in Hong Kong

Coordinates: 22.2703°N 114.1492°E

- Traditional Chinese: 爐峰峽
- Simplified Chinese: 炉峰峡
Transcriptions
Standard Mandarin
- Hanyu Pinyin: Lúfēngxiá
Yue: Cantonese
- Jyutping: lou4 fung1 haap6

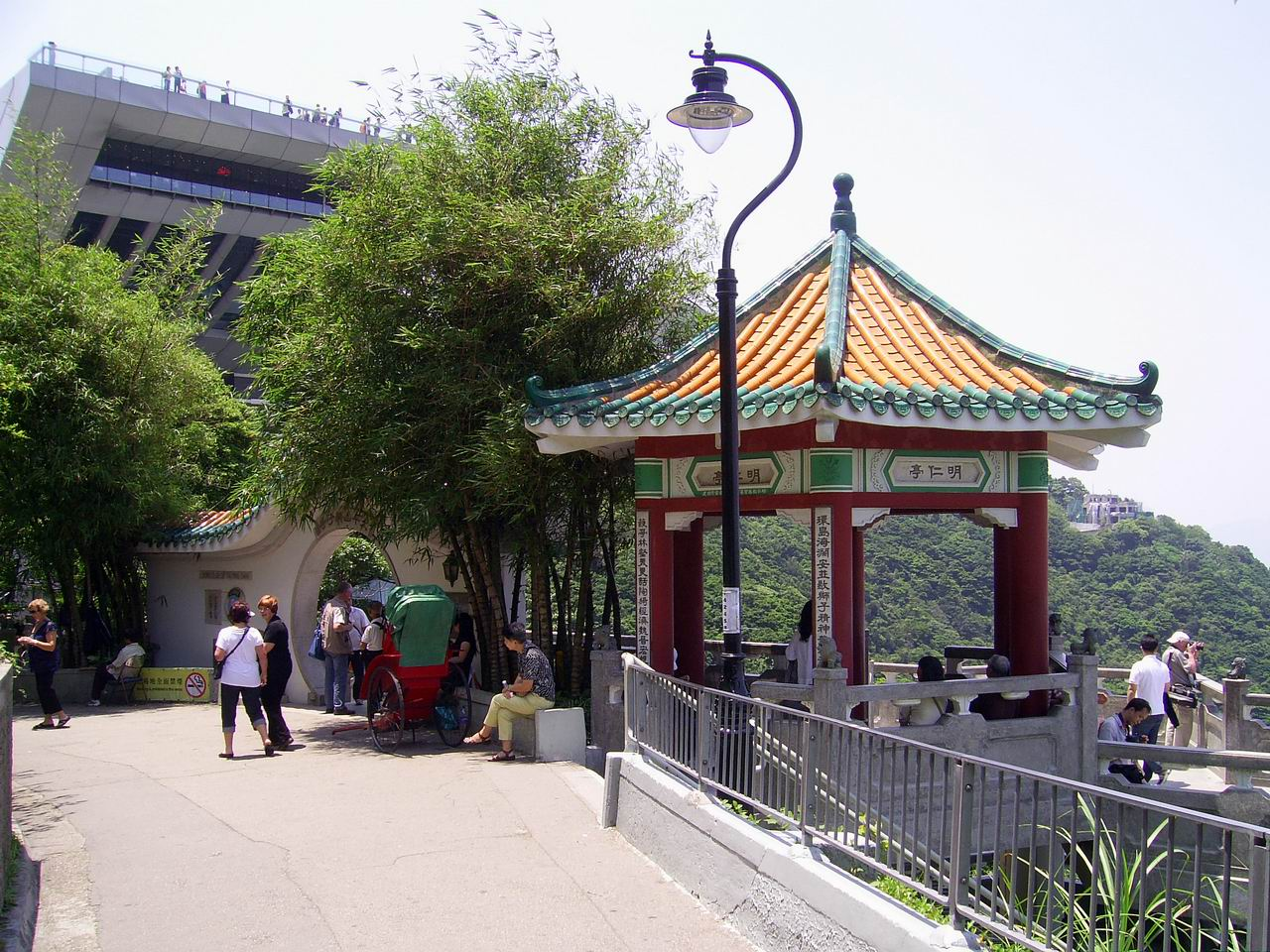
The Lions Pavilion at Victoria Gap, with the Peak Tower in the background

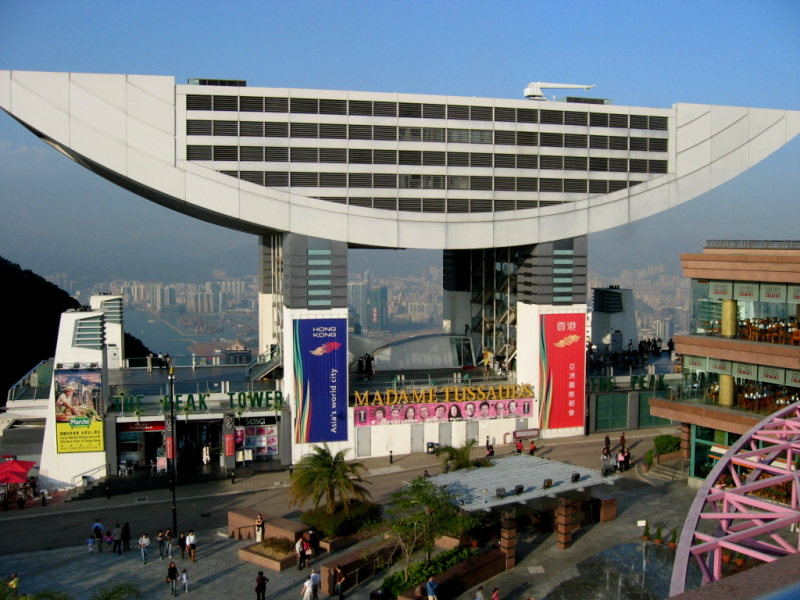
The Peak Tower viewed from The Peak Galleria at Victoria Gap

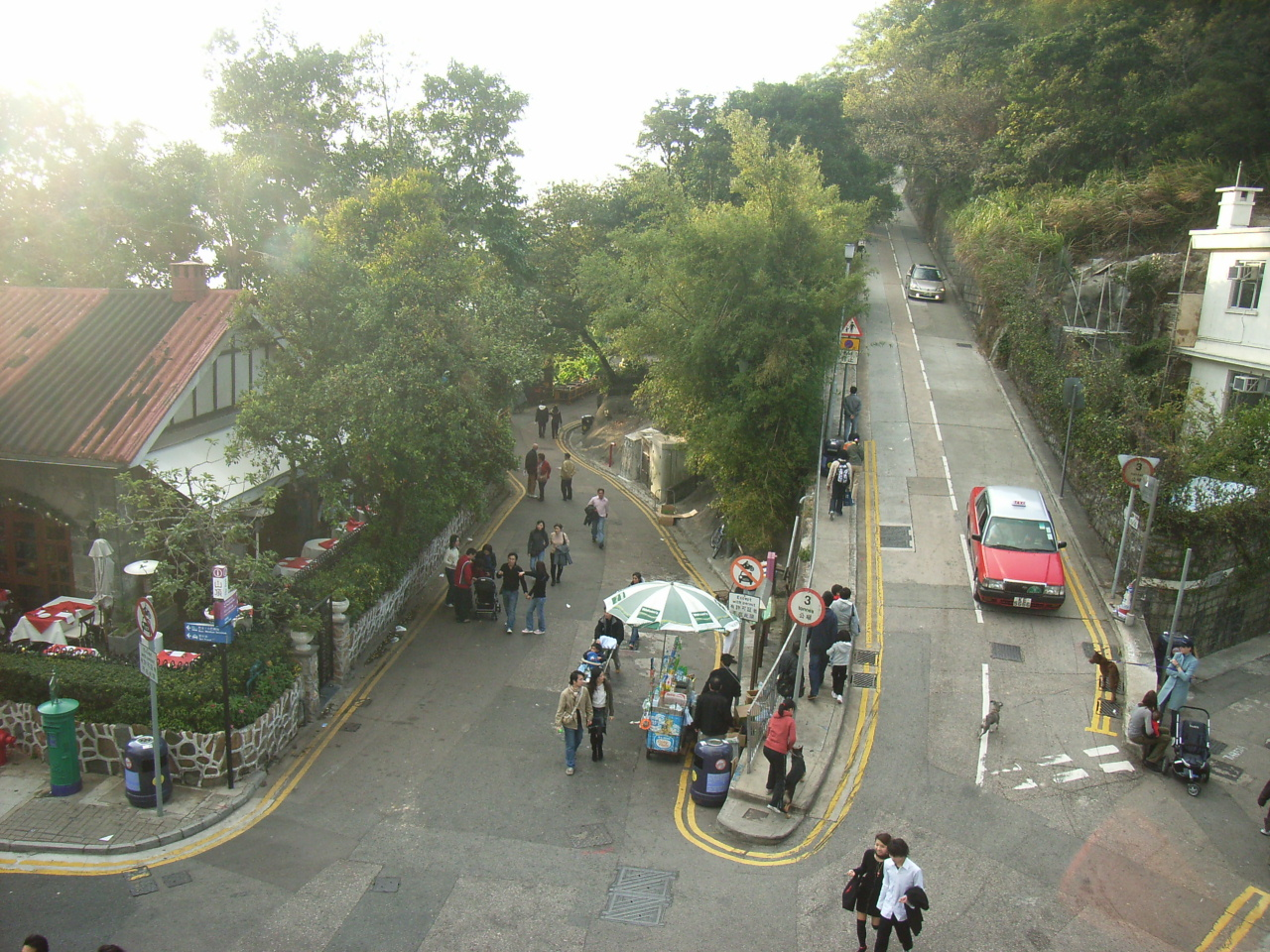
The road junction at Victoria Gap, next to the Peak Tower. From left to right: Peak Road, the Peak Lookout Restaurant, Harlech Road (with street vendor), Mount Austin Road (with taxi), Lugard Road.

Victoria Gap (Chinese: 爐峰峽; Jyutping: lou4 fung1 haap6) is an area and a mountain pass located between the summits of Victoria Peak (aka. Mount Austin) and Mount Gough, on Hong Kong Island, in Hong Kong. It is the most touristic place within the area referred to as The Peak, which receives some seven million visitors every year. Its altitude is 396 metres (1,299 ft) - some 150 metres (490 ft) below the summit of The Peak.

== Features ==
As a tourist destination, Victoria Gap features several attractions:

- Views of Central, Victoria Harbour and Kowloon Peninsula
- The Peak Tower, a leisure and shopping complex
- The Peak Galleria, a leisure and shopping complex
- The Peak Lookout, a restaurant housed in a historic building
- Lions Pavilion, a viewing pavilion
- The Peak Hotel, a hotel located at Victoria Gap from 1888 to 1936

== Transport ==
The upper terminal of the Peak Tram is located below the Peak Tower at Victoria Gap. Several roads lead to Victoria Gap: Peak Road, Old Peak Road, Mount Austin Road, Harlech Road, Lugard Road and Findlay Road.

== See also ==
- List of gaps in Hong Kong
