= Lee Fook Chee =

- Born: December 1, 1927; Singapore
- Died: September 12, 2012 (aged 84); Hong Kong
- Occupation: Photographer

Lee Fook Chee was a Singaporean photographer based in Hong Kong from 1947.

== Career ==
Lee worked intermittently as a journeyman photographer at The Peak from the summer of 1948 until sometime in 1955, when he instead started selling pictures of famous landscapes and the streets of Hong Kong to tourists. With the popularization of colour photography, Lee's black and white pictures started to look outdated and revenue from sales reduced. After trying to sell his pictures in other locations, eventually he gave up the business of photography and ran a grocery shop in Wan Chai with his wife from 1961 onward.

Around 2003, Lee returned to The Peak for financial reasons to sell new prints of his old 1950's pictures. Following the suggestion of Laurence Lai, a Hong Kong photographer and gallery owner, he also started to sell contemporary colour prints of the same landscapes he had photographed before, in order to highlight the changes the city had experienced.

A chance encounter in 2010 with author Edward Stokes eventually led in 2015 to the publication by The Photographic Heritage Foundation of a book of Lee's pictures. Lee died in 2012 before seeing the book published.
