= Mount Kellett =

Mountain on Hong Kong Island

Mount Kellett, Hong Kong
- 奇力山
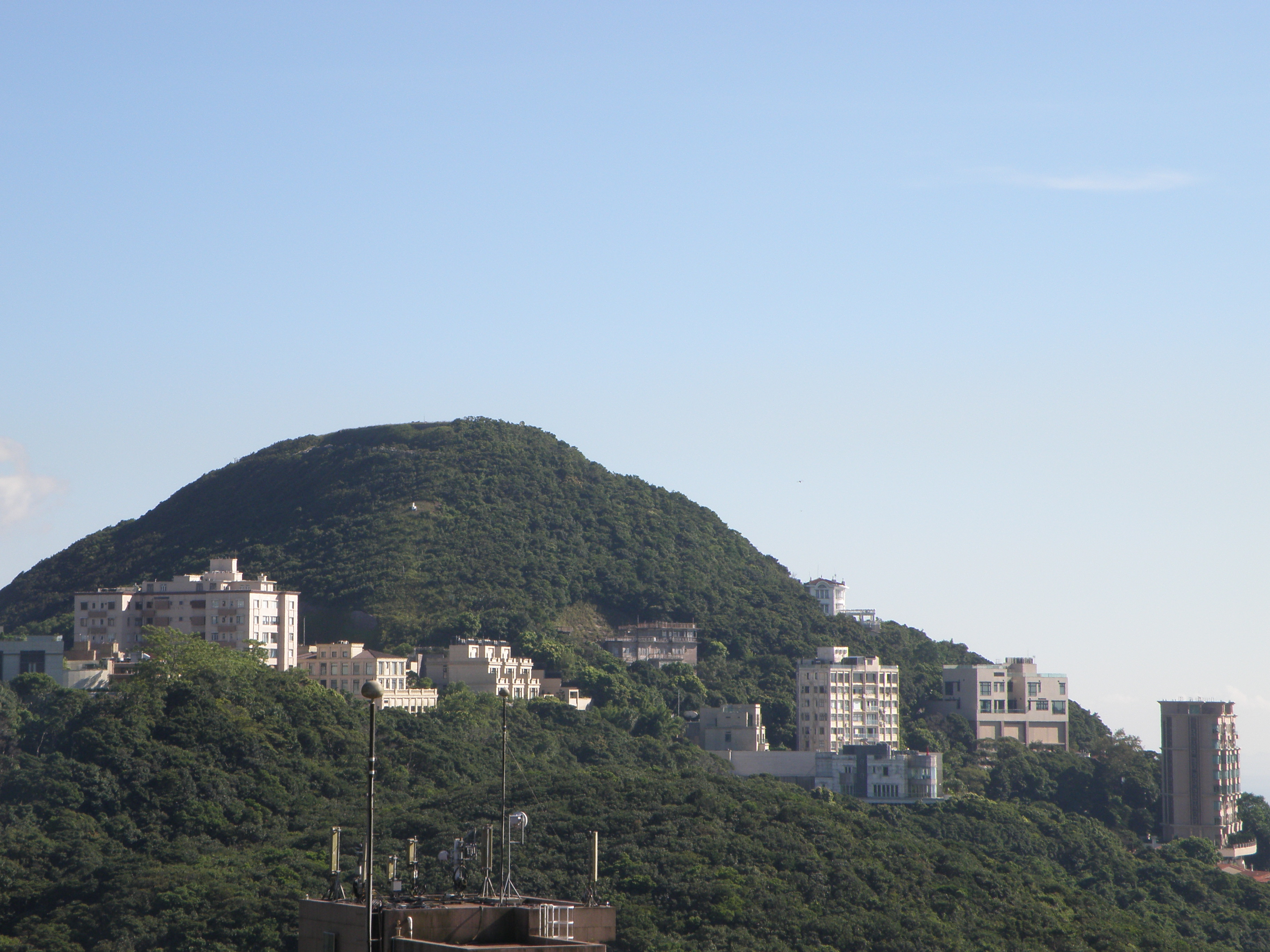
- View of Mount Kellett

Highest point
- Elevation: 501 m (1,644 ft)
- Coordinates: 22°15′42.64″N 114°8′54.37″E

Geography
- Location within Hong Kong
- Location: Hong Kong

Mount Kellett (Chinese: 奇力山) is a 501-metre-high (1,644 ft) mountain on Hong Kong Island, Hong Kong. It was likely named after British Royal Navy Vice Admiral Henry Kellett, the captain of HMS Starling in the 19th century. The area is a medium-class mixed area on the Peak.

A private hospital, Matilda Hospital, is located at the foot of Mount Kellett.

Historically, apart from houses owned by the government, banks and corporations and lived by their officials and chairmen. The less prestigious streets, such as Guildford Road and Mount Kellett Road, face the southside instead of Victoria Harbour.

Some of the large houses on the Peak with historic values, including homes of consulates, and government buildings, were demolished over the decades and redeveloped into smaller houses within managed complexes. In 2006, Sun Hung Kai Properties paid HK$ 1.8b, or 42,196 per sq.ft. through a government auction for a plot at 12 Mt Kellett Road, where there were blocks of flats as housing for medium-grade officials. In 2022, a house ‘Twelve Peaks’ at 12 Mt Kellett Road was sold by the creditors of HNA Chairman Chen Feng, whose business in mainland China was bankrupt, for HK$ 390m, or HK$91,959 per sq. ft. Chen Feng paid HK$ 506m in 2016 or HK$ 119,323 per sq.ft.

In 2025 and 2026, houses at La Hacienda were sold at below HK$30,000 per square feet or around HK$100m. Apartments at La Hacienda were sold at below HK$ 25,000 per square feet which are lower than ones on Mid-levels. These prices are significantly lower than properties in Jardine's Lookout and Southside, making Victoria Peak or The Peak only a second-tier area similar to Mid-levels.

== See also ==
- List of mountains, peaks and hills in Hong Kong
- Victoria Peak
- Mount Gough
