= The Peak Lookout =

- 太平山餐廳
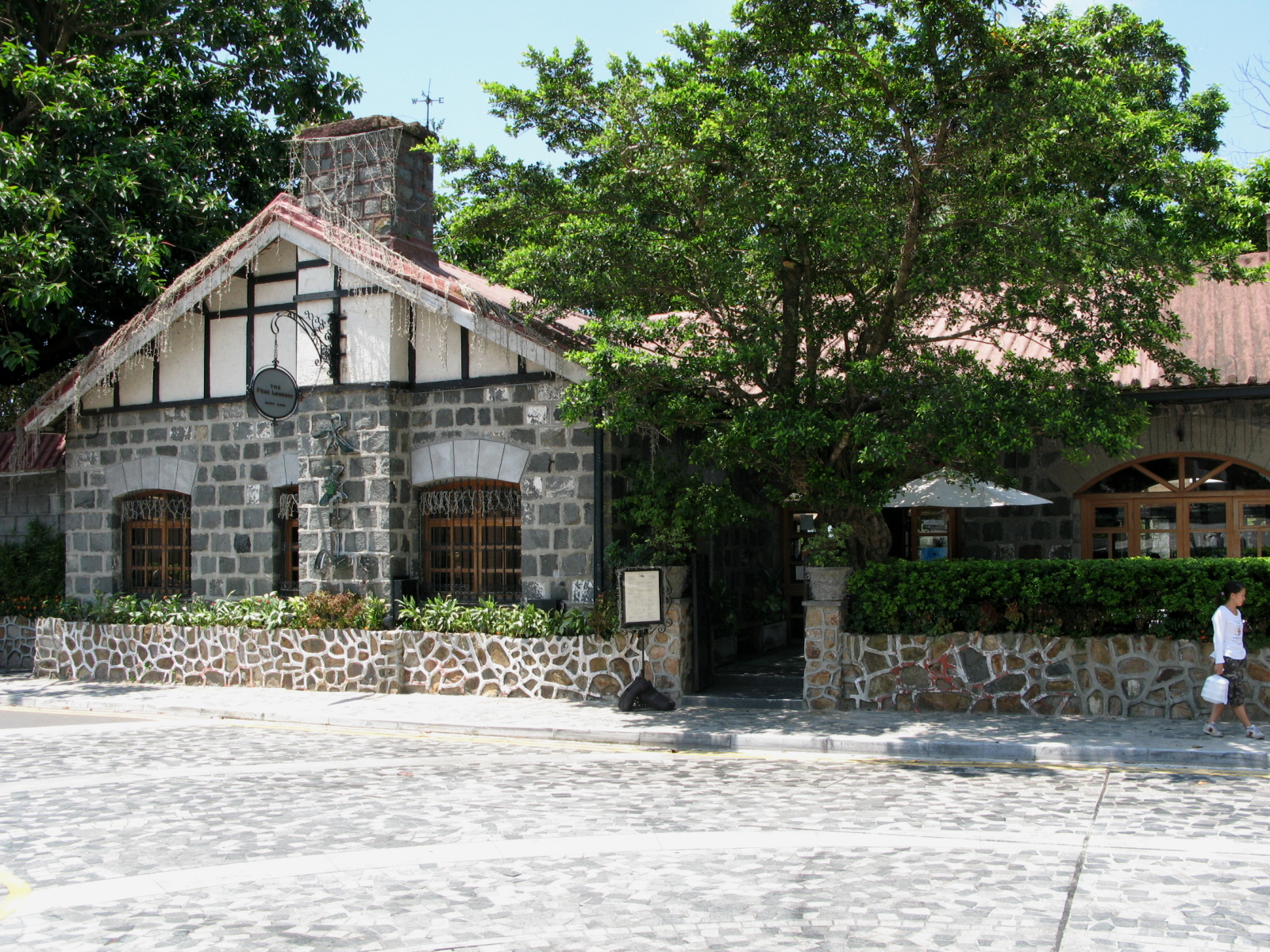
- The Peak Lookout in 2009.
- Interactive map of the The Peak Lookout area
- Former names: Old Peak Café

General information
- Architectural style: Arts and Crafts
- Location: 121 Peak Road, Hong Kong
- Coordinates: 22°16′16.03″N 114°8′57.80″E
- Elevation: 395 m (1,296 ft)
- Completed: 1888; 138 years ago
- Renovated: 1902, 2001, 2012
- Owner: Epicurean Management Limited

Hong Kong Graded Building – Grade II

The Peak Lookout
- Interactive map of The Peak Lookout

Restaurant information
- Established: 1947; 79 years ago
- Owner: Epicurean Management Limited
- Food type: International cuisine
- Location: 121 Peak Road, Hong Kong
- Seating capacity: Indoor dining area:120 Alfresco dining area: 220
- Website: peaklookout.com

The Peak Lookout
- Traditional Chinese: 太平山餐廳
Transcriptions
Yue: Cantonese
- Yale Romanization: Taai pìhng sāan chāan tēng
- Jyutping: Taai3 ping4 saan1 caan1 teng1

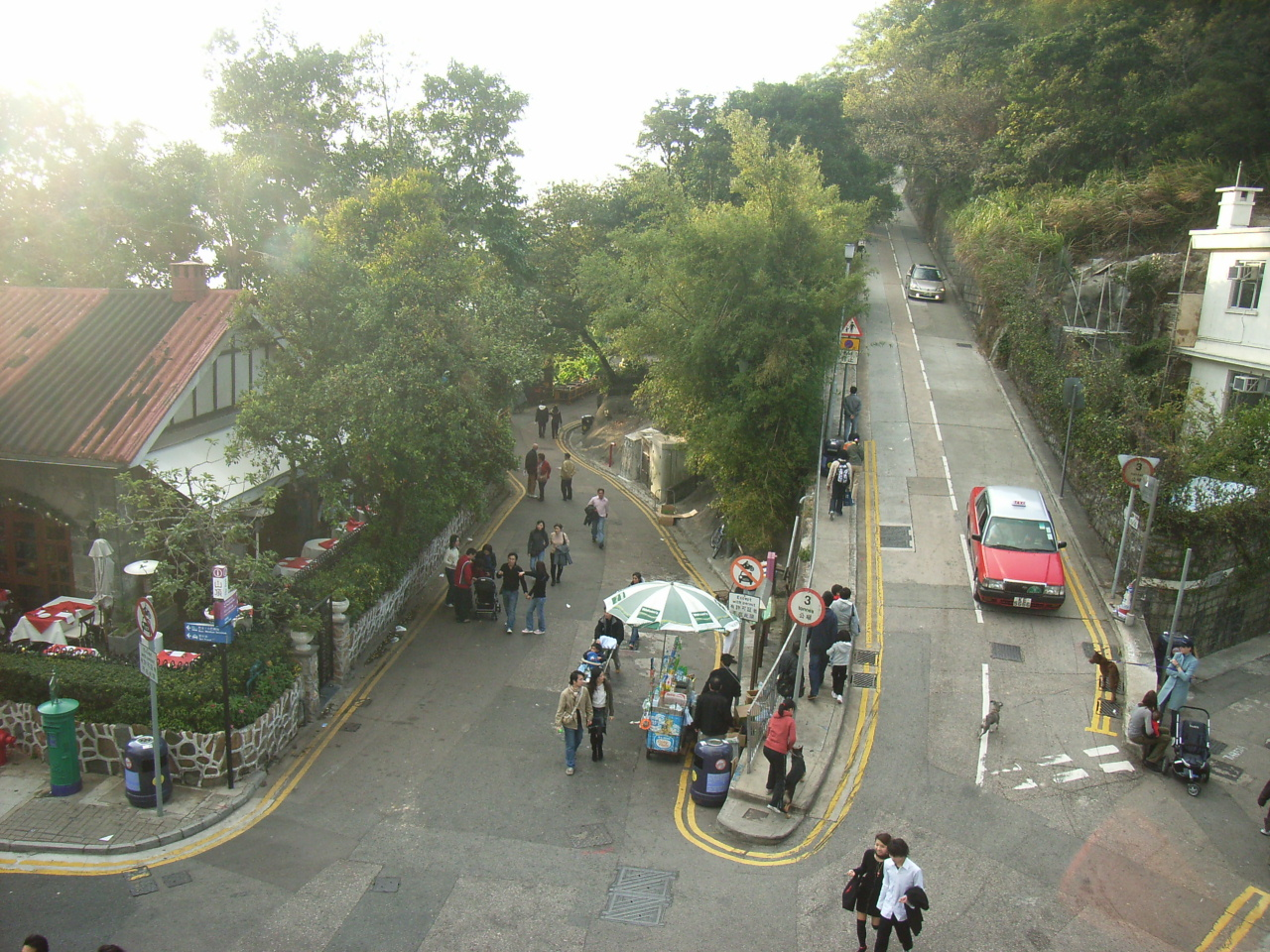
The road junction next to the Peak Tower. From left: Peak Road, The Peak Lookout, Harlech Road (with street vendor), Mount Austin Road (with taxi), Lugard Road.

The Peak Lookout is a restaurant located in a heritage house at Victoria Gap, near the summit of Victoria Peak on Hong Kong Island, Hong Kong. It is housed in a 19th-century Grade II Historic Building. Originally known as the Old Peak Café, the restaurant has an open terrace overlooking Aberdeen, Pok Fu Lam Country Park and the South China Sea. The Peak Lookout at Terminal 1 of the Hong Kong International Airport opened in November 2012.

== History ==
The Peak Lookout has experienced major transformations in function and renovations since the site was used in 1888 as a rest place and workshop for British engineers that constructed the Peak Tram line.

In 1901, the site was handed over to the government and built into a chair shelter and rest place for sedan chair carriers for both public and private sedan chairs (similar to taxis and chauffeurs today).

An 1898 official report stated: "A suitable area is being leveled for the accommodation of chairs and it is proposed to erect a permanent structure on this site as a shelter for chairs and bearers." Shortly afterwards, it was reported that: "The masonry is completed and the roof is on, so that the coolies can even now shelter from the weather. The building being in an exposed position is built in a very solid and massive way to defy typhoons." In 1902, it was reported that the building had been fully completed: "It is divided into two sections, one of which is for the accommodation of public chairs, whilst the other is for private chairs. The former is entirely enclosed, large sliding doors being provided along the front, whilst the latter is left open in front. The Walls are of the blue stone obtainable in the neighbourhood, with granite dressings, and the floors are laid with cement concrete, the roofs being tiled in the usual way. A space is left in front of the shed, clear of the road, on which the chairs can stand during fine weather."

It has been suggested that the stone for the building may have been left over from the construction of the Governor's Peak residence, Mountain Lodge, which has now been demolished. It was opened to the public in 1923 when sedan chair carriers were allowed to serve for tourists at the Peak.

During the Japanese occupation of Hong Kong (1941–1945), the chair shelter was believed to be used by the Japanese army as a police station.

The catering history began in 1947 when it was suggested that the building should be converted into an open-air café, serving light refreshments. "Since that date," wrote an official of the Peak Tram in 1977, "the building has been used as a café. Subsequently the arches of the building were fitted with wood and glass doors and, at a latter date, wooden flooring was laid on top of the original concrete floor. Other than these minor modifications, the building stands as it was originally built."

The increasing popularity of the Peak area led to a proposal in 1973 to demolish The Peak Lookout building to make way for a car park. The resulting outcry and public petition ensured that this plan was scrapped. The Old Peak Café was given Grade II Historic Building status as a historic building in Hong Kong by the Antiquities and Monuments Office in 1981. Grade II is defined as "Buildings of special merit; efforts should be made to selectively preserve". As the 1973 petition was approved, the company Freedragon Ltd. won the bid for the rental contract from the government to continue running the café business when the café's rental contract expired in 1989. The Old Peak Café was renovated and renamed The Peak Lookout in 2001. Most recently in October 2012, The Peak Lookout reopened its doors following a redesign, which includes the introduction of a contemporary raised outdoor terrace for al fresco dining.

== Architecture ==
Originally, the architecture of The Peak Lookout was largely in the Arts and Crafts style, which was popular in late-Victorian and Edwardian times. However, due to numerous renovations and other alterations throughout the years, The Peak Lookout now has a considerably different appearance to when it was originally used as a chair shelter. For example, the roof tiles have been replaced by Chinese ones.

It is a single-storey building with a red, pitched roof, reminiscent of an English country cottage. Adding to this impression are the stone walls, arched windows, black and white half-timbering on the gable, and the visible chimney stack. The building's garden surrounds are notable for the old boundary wall, and a wide variety of trees, shrubs and flowers complete the austere, rural appearance.

The inside of the restaurant is dimly lit and decorated with old photographs of life on the Peak several generations ago. Most of the earlier interior ambiance has been retained.

The Peak Lookout is one of few remaining examples of Arts and Crafts architecture in Hong Kong. The restaurant continues to attract local patrons from Hong Kong as well as foreign visitors. Due to its historical background, food and views, The Peak Lookout is a popular venue for hosting weddings and private events.

== Surroundings ==
Other structures located near the Peak Lookout include:

- The Peak Tower, a leisure and shopping complex, where the Peak Tram terminus is located
- The Peak Galleria, a shopping mall

== See also ==
- Central and Western Heritage Trail
