= The Peak Hotel =

Hotel in Hong Kong

The Peak Hotel 山頂酒店
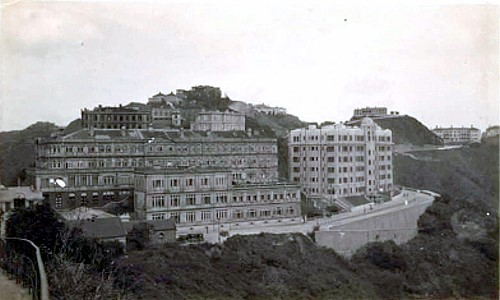
- The Peak Hotel in the 1930s
- Interactive map of the The Peak Hotel 山頂酒店 area

General information
- Location: Victoria Peak, Hong Kong
- Coordinates: 22.27087°N 114.14990°E
- Opening: 1888
- Closed: 1936

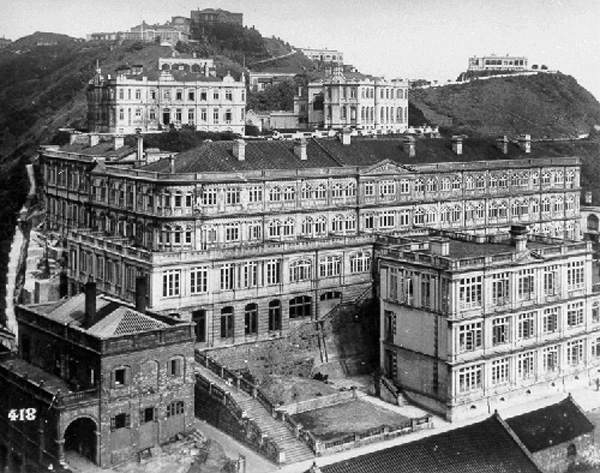
The Peak Hotel in 1926

The Peak Hotel (Chinese: 山頂酒店; Jyutping: saan1 deng2 zau2 dim3) was a hotel located at Victoria Gap, at upper terminus of the Peak Tram, near the summit of Victoria Peak on Hong Kong Island, Hong Kong. It started as a bar and restaurant, and a hotel with twenty bedrooms for summer visitors opening about the same time as the Peak Tram, in 1888.

About 13 years earlier, in 1875, N.J. Ede had built a house named Dunheved on the property. In 1881, Alexander Findlay Smith, a Scottish former railway man, had petitioned for the right to introduce a funicular railway to Hong Kong. The Peak Tram was built and began operations in 1888. About the same time, Findlay Smith bought Dunheved from Ede, and reopened it as the Peak Hotel; Ede and his family moved next door.

After the Peak Tram opened, Findlay Smith quickly put the Peak Hotel on the market. It was sold and completely rebuilt into an imposing three-story building, reopening in 1890. It boasted of commodious and well-appointed accommodation, and the hotel was deservedly popular. Later, another story was added to make it four stories, and then a two-story annex with views down to Pok Fu Lam was built. A further addition doubled the size of the annex and added a third story. The hotel commanded views of the city and Victoria Harbour in one direction, and of Pok Fu Lam facing Lamma Island in the other.

In 1922, the hotel was bought by the owners of the rival Hongkong Hotel for HK$600,000. The hotel's poor construction led to further deterioration. It closed in 1936, and in 1938 its fate was finally sealed by a fire. Today, the Peak Hotel's former site is occupied by The Peak Galleria complex.
