= Victoria Peak =

Hill in Hong Kong

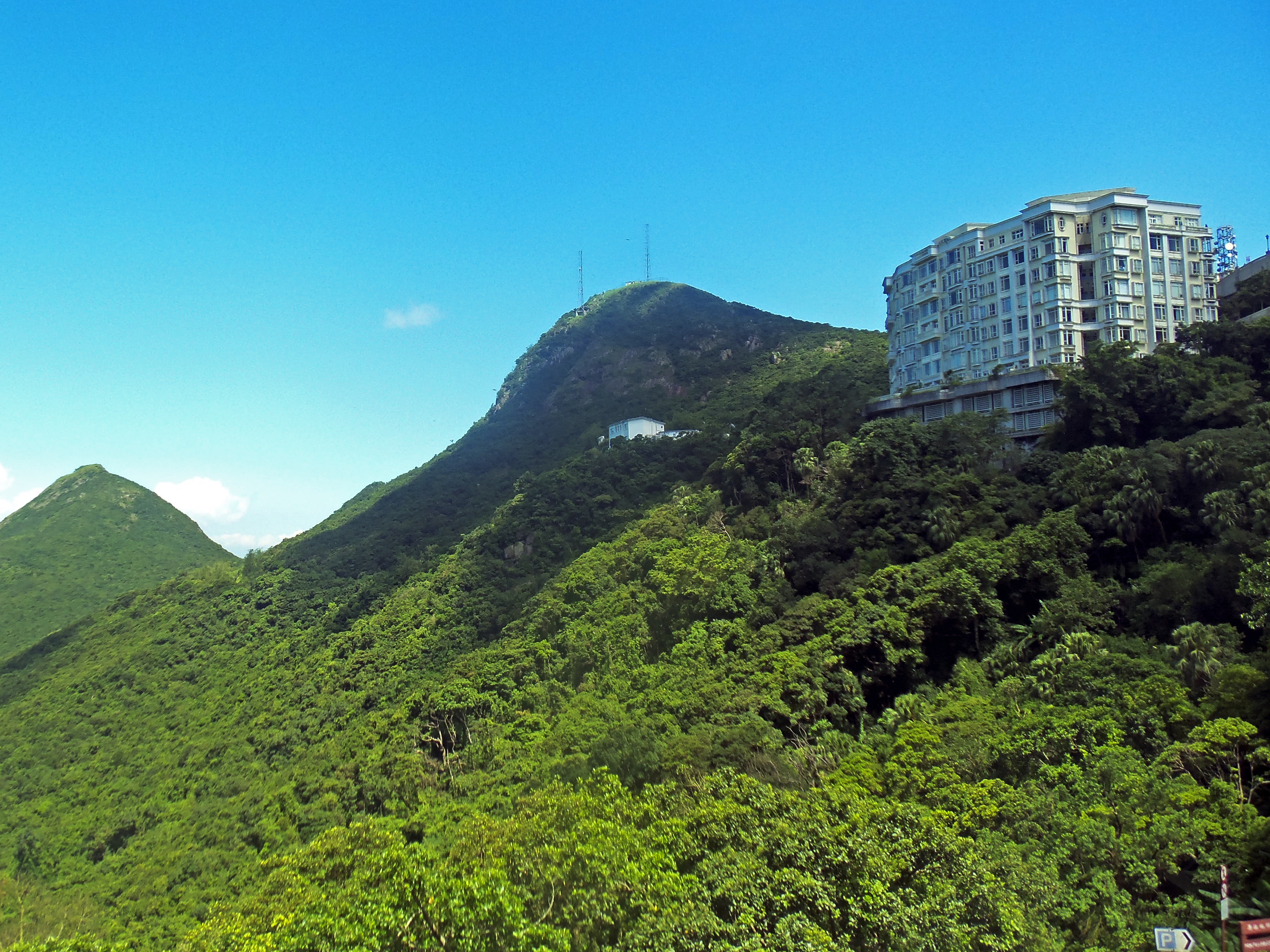
- Victoria Peak from Victoria Gap

Highest point
- Elevation: 552 m (1,811 ft); HKPD
- Prominence: 552 m (1,811 ft)
- Coordinates: 22°16′32″N 114°8′38″E

Naming
- Native name: 太平山 (Chinese)

Geography
- Location within Hong Kong
- Location: Central and Western District, Hong Kong Island

Chinese name
- Chinese: 太平山
Transcriptions
Standard Mandarin
- Hanyu Pinyin: Tàipíngshān
Yue: Cantonese
- Yale Romanization: Taai pìhng sāan
- Jyutping: Taai3 ping4 saan1

Alternative Chinese name
- Chinese: 扯旗山
Transcriptions
Standard Mandarin
- Hanyu Pinyin: Chěqíshān
Yue: Cantonese
- Yale Romanization: Ché kèih sāan
- Jyutping: Ce2 kei4 saan1

Victoria Peak (Chinese: 太平山; Jyutping: taai3 ping4 saan1) is a hill on the western half of Hong Kong Island. It is also known as the Mount Austin, and locally as The Peak only generally. With an elevation of 552 metres (1,811 ft), it is the tallest hill on Hong Kong Island, and the 29th tallest in the territory of Hong Kong. It is a major tourist attraction, offering views of Central, Victoria Harbour, Lamma Island and the surrounding islands.

The summit of Victoria Peak is occupied by a radio telecommunications facility and is closed to the public. The name The Peak is usually a reference to the surrounding area of public parks, tourist facilities and high-value residential land. The Peak also refers to Victoria Peak itself and its nearby areas, including Victoria Gap, Mount Kellett and Mount Gough. Sometimes Bowen Hill may also be included.

The Peak is also known as a residential area consisting of different neighbourhoods including the less affluent Mount Kellett Road which faces Southside. The Peak also has a diverse range of residential properties, ranging from as small as 696 sq.ft on Mount Austin Road.

Based on a number of transactions since the 2020s, Victoria Peak or The Peak is no longer among the top three most expensive residential areas in Hong Kong. Its prices are similar to the lesser pretigious areas such as Shouson Hill and Stanley.

In 2025 and 2026, apartments and houses at La Hacienda, Mount Kellett Road, were sold at around HK$24,000 and HK$ 30,000 per square feet respectively, which represent about 30 percent lower than those in Jardine's Lookout and half of those in Deep Water Bay. Rents of apartments on the Peak, from HK$ 50 per quare foot are lower than comparable ones of buildings of similar age on Mid-levels. The apartments' prices and values are lower than equivalent ones on Mid-levels.

== History ==
As early as the 19th century, the Peak attracted prominent European residents because of its panoramic view over the city and its temperate climate compared to the sub-tropical climate in the rest of Hong Kong. The sixth Governor of Hong Kong, Sir Richard MacDonnell had a summer residence built on the Peak circa 1868. Those that built houses named them whimsically, such as The Eyrie, and the Austin Arms.

These original residents reached their homes by sedan chairs, which were carried up and down the steep slope of Victoria Peak. This limited development of the Peak until the opening of the Peak Tram funicular in 1888.

The boost to accessibility caused by the opening of the Peak Tram created demand for residences on the Peak. Between 1904 and 1930, the Peak Reservation Ordinance designated the Peak as an exclusive residential area reserved for non-Chinese. They also reserved the Peak Tram for the use of such passengers during peak periods. The Peak remains an upmarket residential area, although residency today is based on wealth.

In 1905, construction of the Pinewood Battery was completed on the western side of the Peak. Harlech Road was constructed around the Peak as a means of resupply to this artillery and later anti-aircraft battery.

During 1904 and 1947, Chinese people were not allowed to live on the Peak according to the Peak District Reservation Ordinance when Hong Kong was a colony. In the 1920s Robert Hotung was the first Chinese person to live on the Peak because at the time he was considered mixed-race. Ho Tung Gardens located at 75 Peak Road, was owned by Robert Hotung for decades, until it was sold in 2015 for HK$5.1 billion or HK$82,258 per sq.ft., a price which was 20% below single lot landed houses in Jardine's Lookout.1 Purves Road (包華士道1號), Jardines Lookout | OneDay (搵地)

Historically, apart from houses owned by the government, banks and corporations and lived on by their officials and chairmen, the Peak also had some multi-block estates, with medium-sized flats used as housing for more junior staff. These are located on less prestigious streets, such as Guildford Road and Mount Kellett Road, which face Southside instead of Victoria Harbour.

In November 1996 businessman Wong Yuk Kwan paid HK$540 million for a house at 23 Severn Road called 'Genesis,' which was built in the 1980s by Heung Chi-kau. Another house Wong bought was 10-18 Pollock's Path, known as 'Skyhigh.' Owned by HSBC and lived in by the bank's Chairmen, Skyhigh was sold to Kazuo Wada, the president of Yaohan, for HK$85 million in early 1990s. Because Yaohan went bankrupt, Kazuo Wada sold to businessman Wong Yuk Kwan for HK$370 million. In 2004, after SARS, actor Stephen Chow bought Skyhigh, and brought in Ryoden Development as a joint venture partner to rebuild the land into four houses. Genesis was sold by creditors in 2001 for HK$240m, less than 50% of what Wong Kwan paid.

These property transactions at the Peak were desperate sales by cash-strapped businessmen during crisis of different economic cycles.

== Changes in neighbourhood ==
Some large houses on The Peak with historic values, including homes of consulates, and government buildings were demolished over the decades and redeveloped into smaller houses within managed complexes. In 2006, Sun Hung Kai Properties paid HK$1.8b, or 42,196 per sq.ft. through a government auction for a plot at 12 Mount Kellett Road, where there were blocks of flats as housing for medium-grade officials. In 2022, a house at the complex 'Twelve Peaks' at 12 Mount Kellett Road was sold by the creditors of HNA Chairman Chen Feng, whose business in mainland China was bankrupt, for HK$390m, or HK$91,959 per sq. ft. Chen Feng paid HK$506m in 2016 or HK$119,323 per sq.ft.

Despite record-breaking transactions reported by international news from the 1990s until 2010s, In fact, The Peak is not the most expensive residential area in Hong Kong. Deep Water Bay and Jardine's Lookout are also one of the most expensive residential areas. A house at 75 Deep Water Bay Road, near Li Ka-shing's home, was sold by Pan Sutong for HK$3.3b, or HK$240,000 per sq.ft., Cheung Chung-kiu, Chairman of CC Land, purchased 1 Purves Road, Jardine's Lookout for about HK$760 million, or around HK$100,000 per square foot. In 2018, a site on Perkins Road, Jardine's Lookout, was sold for HK$145,000 per sq.ft. Transactions of these two houses that do not face harbour views indicate a few with harbour views in Jardine's Lookout are valued at HK$ 200,000 per square foot.

Another benchmark for measuring values is the annual published figures by the government's rating and valuation department, based on estimated rental values, although such properties are not rented out to third parties. Figures published in 2021 included 35 Barker Road, owned by Lee Shau-kee, to be among the top five most valuable houses. However, 35 Barker Road consists of three houses, and so it should not be compared to other houses.

The Peak has a diverse mix of apartment buildings and houses of different sizes and quality, and as a tourist destination, also has hospitals, schools and malls. Many properties are also owned for rental purposes typically occupied by expatriates. The Mount Austin is a complex owned by Nan Fung Group with apartments of sizes ranging from 696 sq.ft. Plantation Road has a property with many purpose-built blocks for rent, temporary staff housing of small units and facilities for staff.

Barker Road is one of the most desirable streets because it is located below the level where harbour views are affected during foggy seasons. In 2010, Lee Shau Kee, Chairman of Henderson Land Development, bought a site at 35 Barker Road for HK$1.82b and rebuilt into three houses as his family's dwellings after originally living in a penthouse on Mid-levels. In 2015, Alibaba's founder Jack Ma bought a house on Barker Road for HK$1.5b or HK$150,000 per sq.ft.

In 2020, developer The Wharf (Holdings) bought a plot at Mansfield Road on the Peak for HK$12b or HK$46,300 per sq. ft. through government auction. This site is one of the last plots of sites owned by the Hong Kong Government used previously as accommodation for civil servants.

In July 2024, the owner of 46 Plantation Road sold four houses with the plot for HK$11 billion which represented around HK$65,000 per sq.ft. The property faces Victoria Harbour on a long road that has many properties of different types. The price per sq.ft. represents a decrease of around 50% compared to the level in the late-2010s. In August 2024, the same former owner of 46 Plantation Road sold another plot at 99 Peak Road with three houses at HK$860 million which represented below HK$60,000 per sq.ft. Hong Kong Peak mansions sold for HK$860 million as family offloads assets

Individual lots on the Peak are different than those of areas like Deep Water Bay and Jardine's Lookout, where both single family houses and multi-family blocks of flats can be constructed so long as the maximum plot ratio is 0.5. This provides flexibility for newer owners like Jack Ma and developer CSI who developed no. 22 and no. 47 Barker Road respectively using multi-family flats. Buildings Department permit exempted areas for such owners, outside of plot ratio, to accommodate shared facilities like club houses. As a result, the maximum useable area can be substantially increased thereby making price per square feet of the Peak artificially higher than comparable areas. This also creates a mix of single houses and apartment blocks on same streets or neighbourhoods, which can be perceived as less exclusive.

In 2025, apartments on Victoria Peak sold for below HK$ 25,000 per sq.ft., townhouses below HK$30,000, and landed single-lot below HK$ 60,000 significantly below Deep Water Bay and Jardine's Lookout.

Mount Nicholson, a development by Nan Fung Group, is located within the Peak Area of Outline Zoning Plan. It is geographically located on Mid-Levels East according to property agencies' areas. Black's Link, although it is also within The Peak Area of Outline Zoning Plan, is geographically near Deep Water Bay.

In October 2026, Wharf sold two houses on Plantation Road (Strawberry Hill) at HK$100m each or Hk$ 32,000 per sq.ft. This price level is equivalent to Shouson Hill and Stanley, and substantially lower than that of Deep Water Bay, Repulse Bay, and Jardine's Lookout. Because of the large number of available units and abundant supply, the Peak is a second-tier area in Hong Kong compared to Deep Water Bay and Jardine's Lookout.

== Ecology ==
The Peak is home to many species of birds, most prominently the black kite, and numerous species of butterflies. Wild boar and porcupines are also seen on Peak, along with a variety of snakes.

== Tourism ==
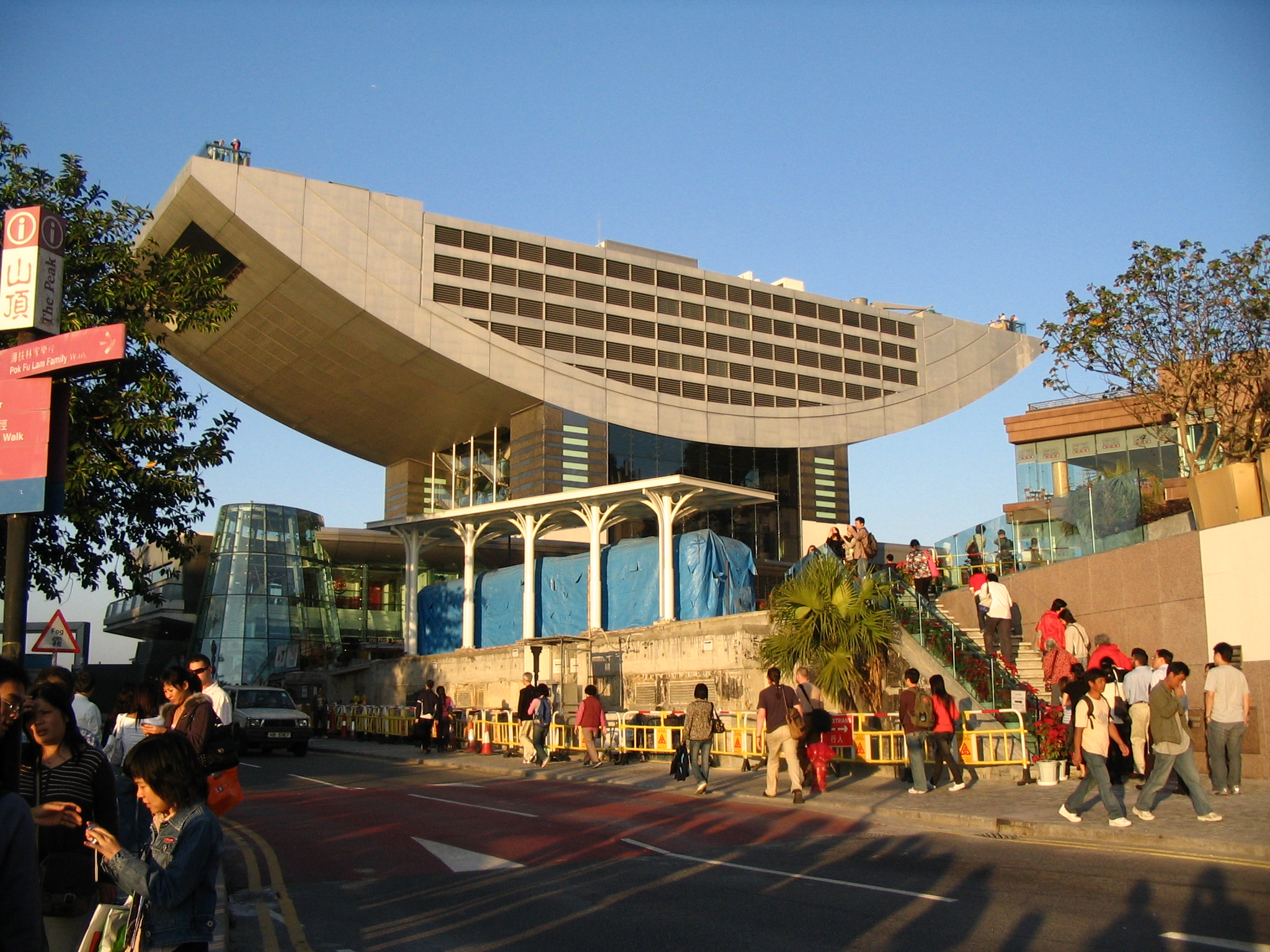
The Peak Tower from Peak Road. The Peak Galleria is to the right.

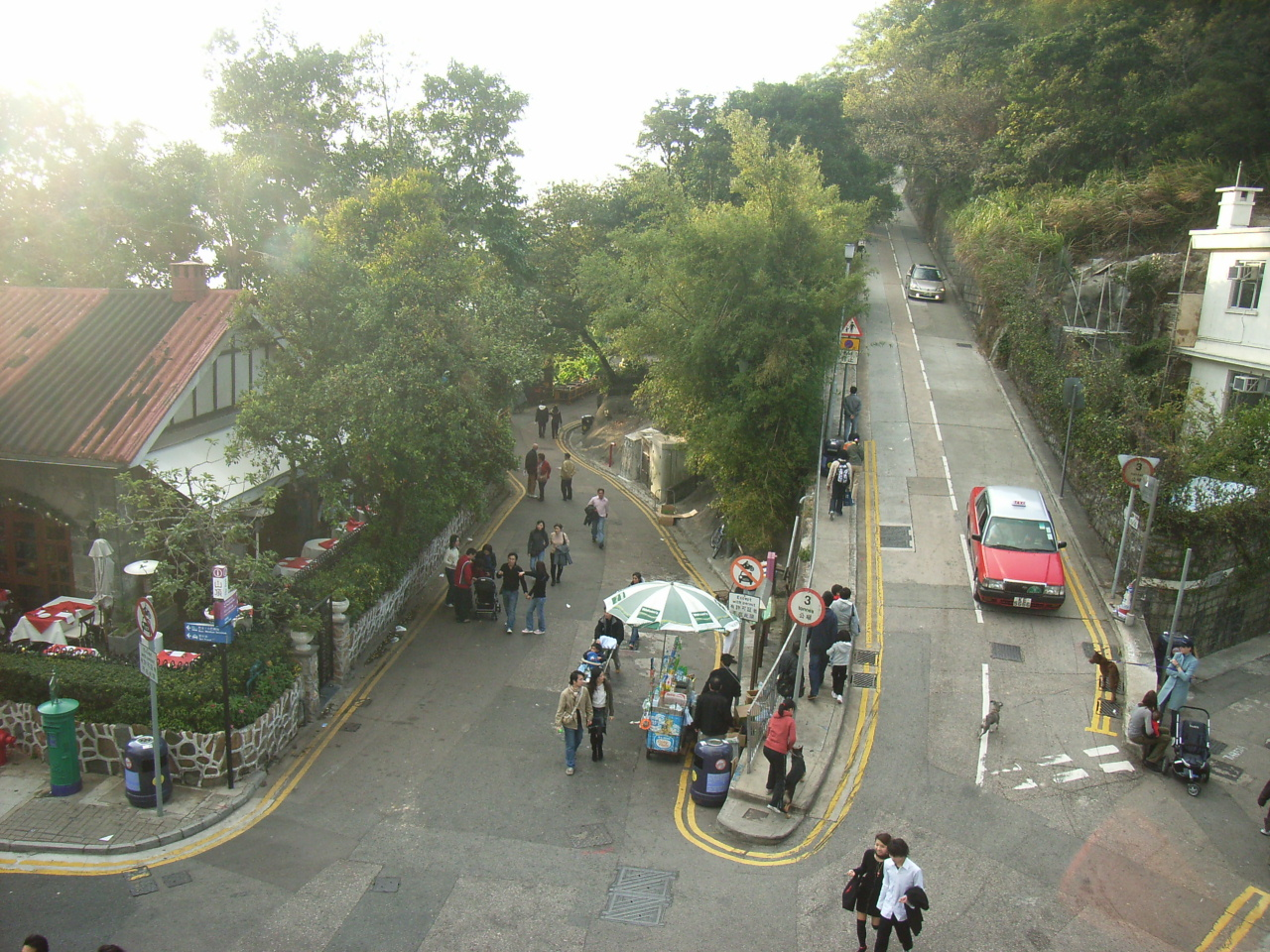
The road junction at Victoria Gap, next to the Peak Tower. From left to right: Peak Road, the Peak Lookout Restaurant, Harlech Road (with street vendor), Mount Austin Road (with taxi), and Lugard Road.

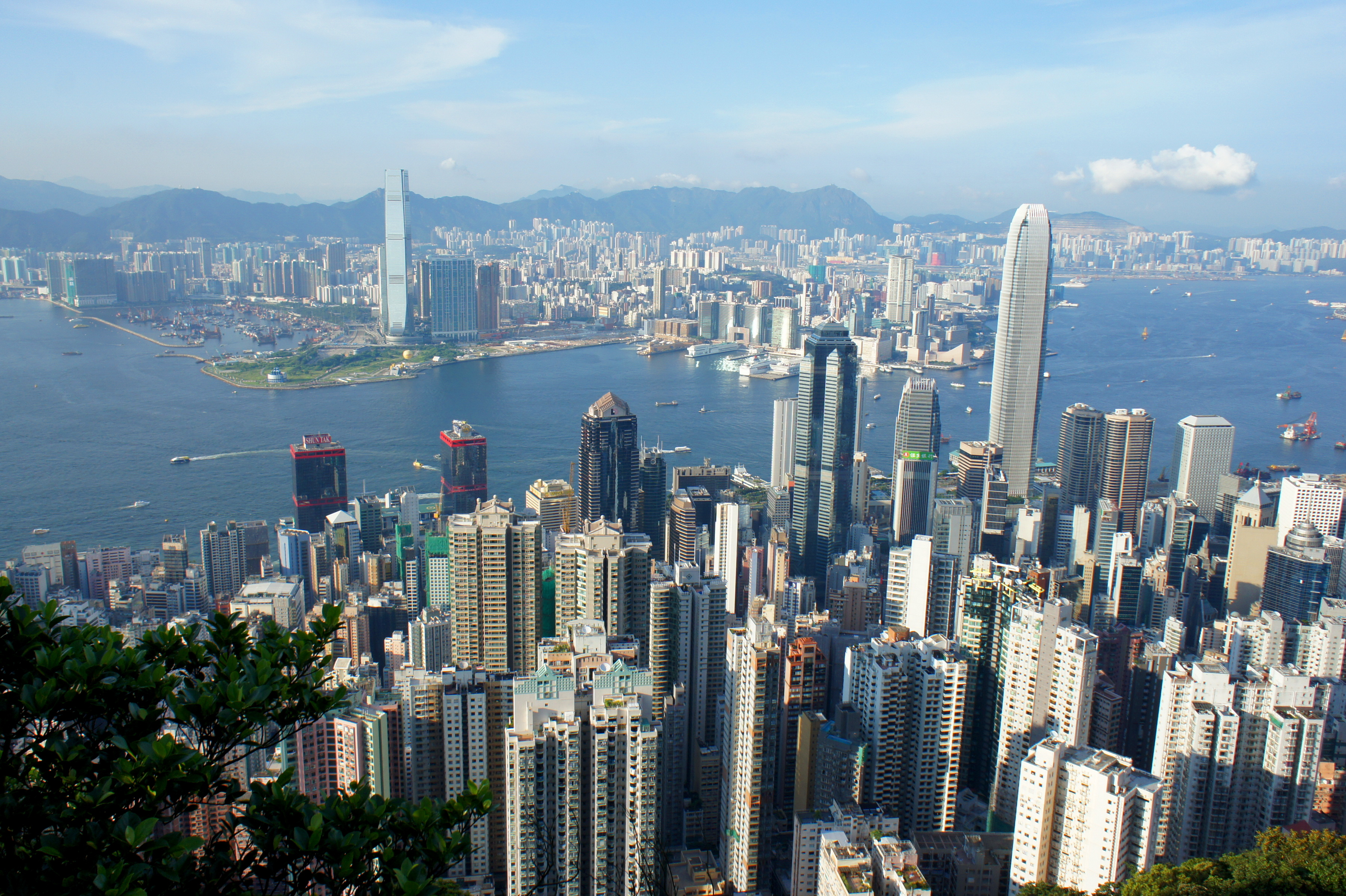
View of Victoria Harbour from Victoria Peak. The 'Victoria Harbour Gateway' formed by the Two International Finance Centre and the International Commerce Centre on the opposite shore can clearly be seen.

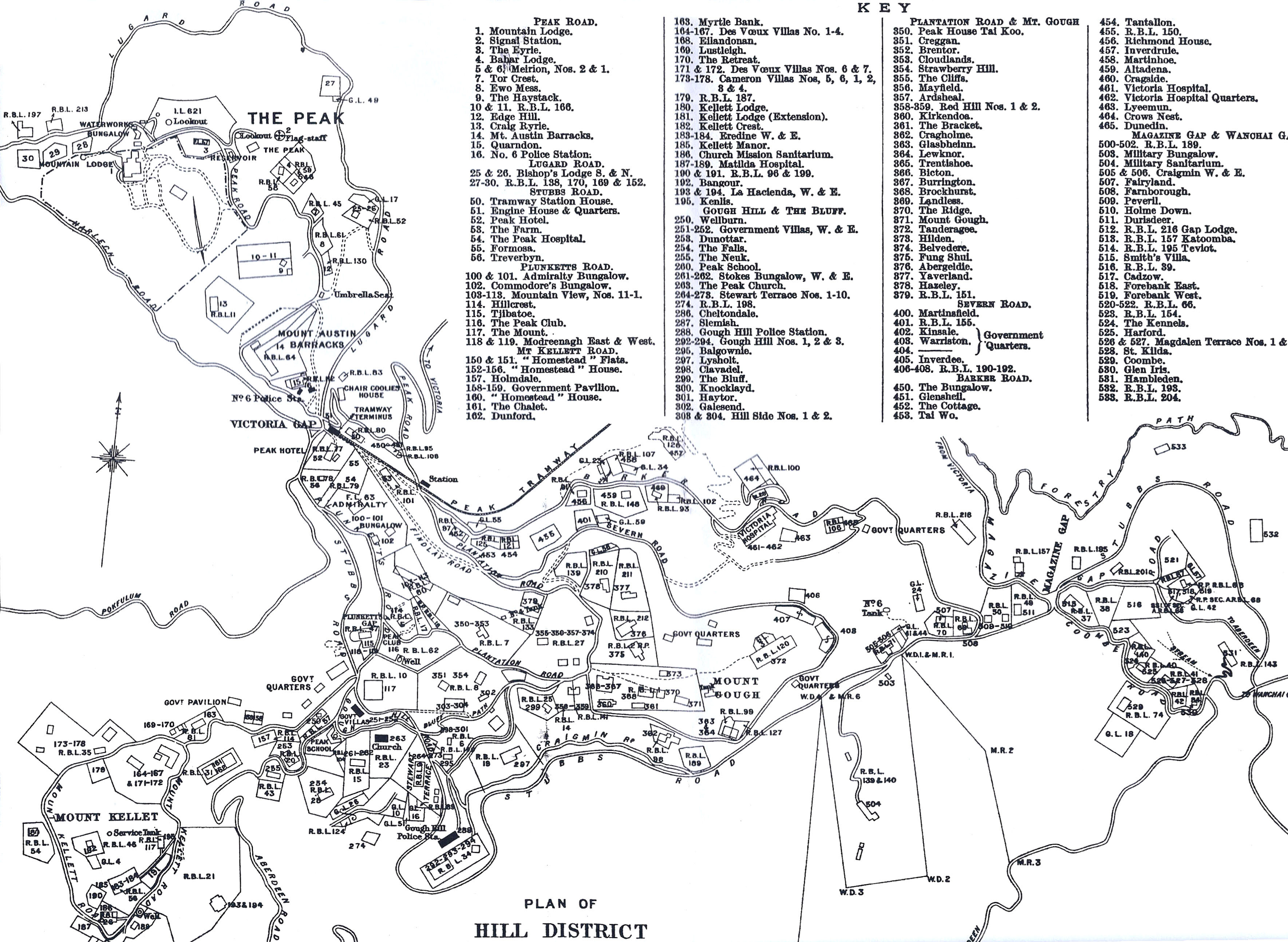
1924 map of The Peak's residences

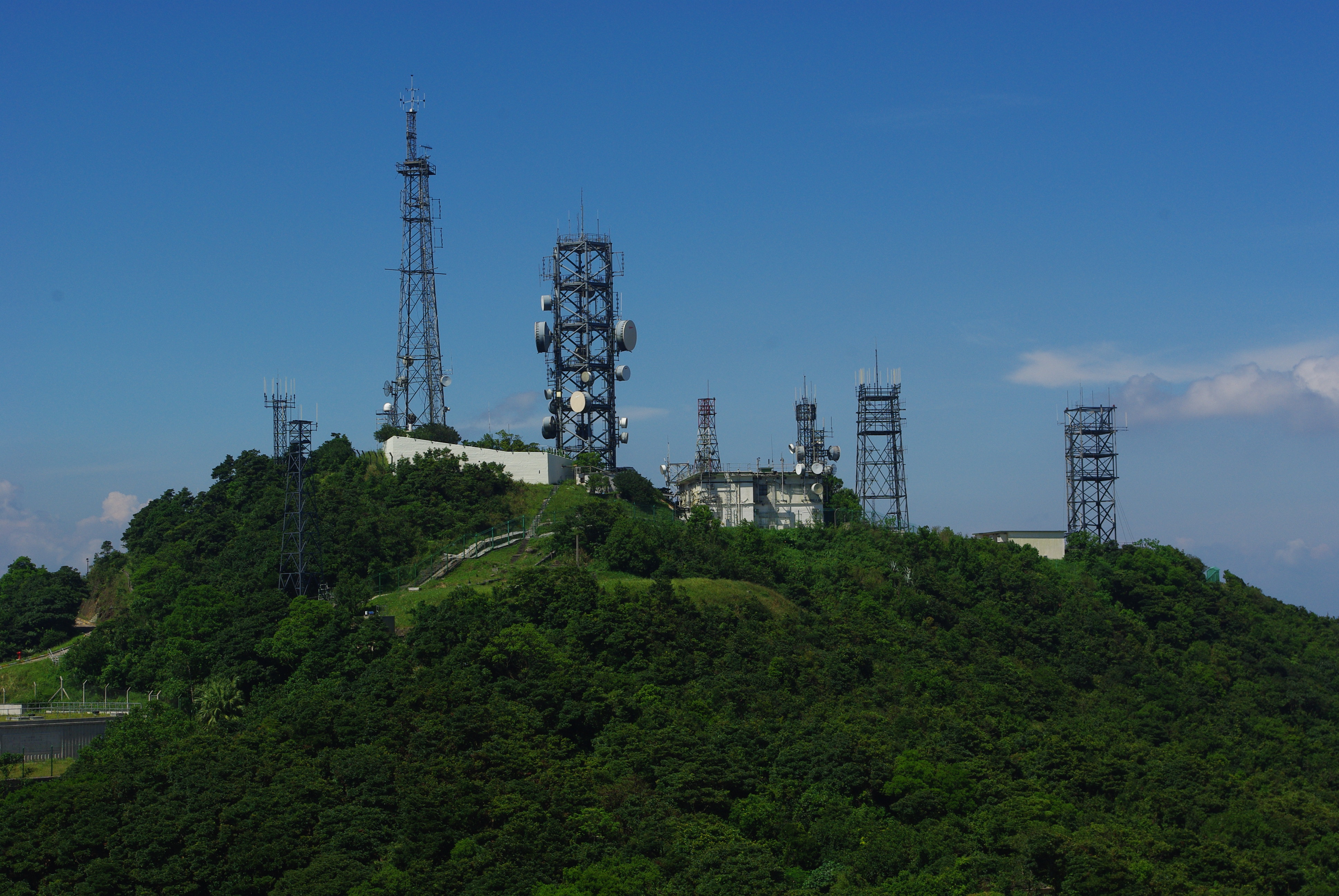
The summit is the site of radio telecommunication facilities

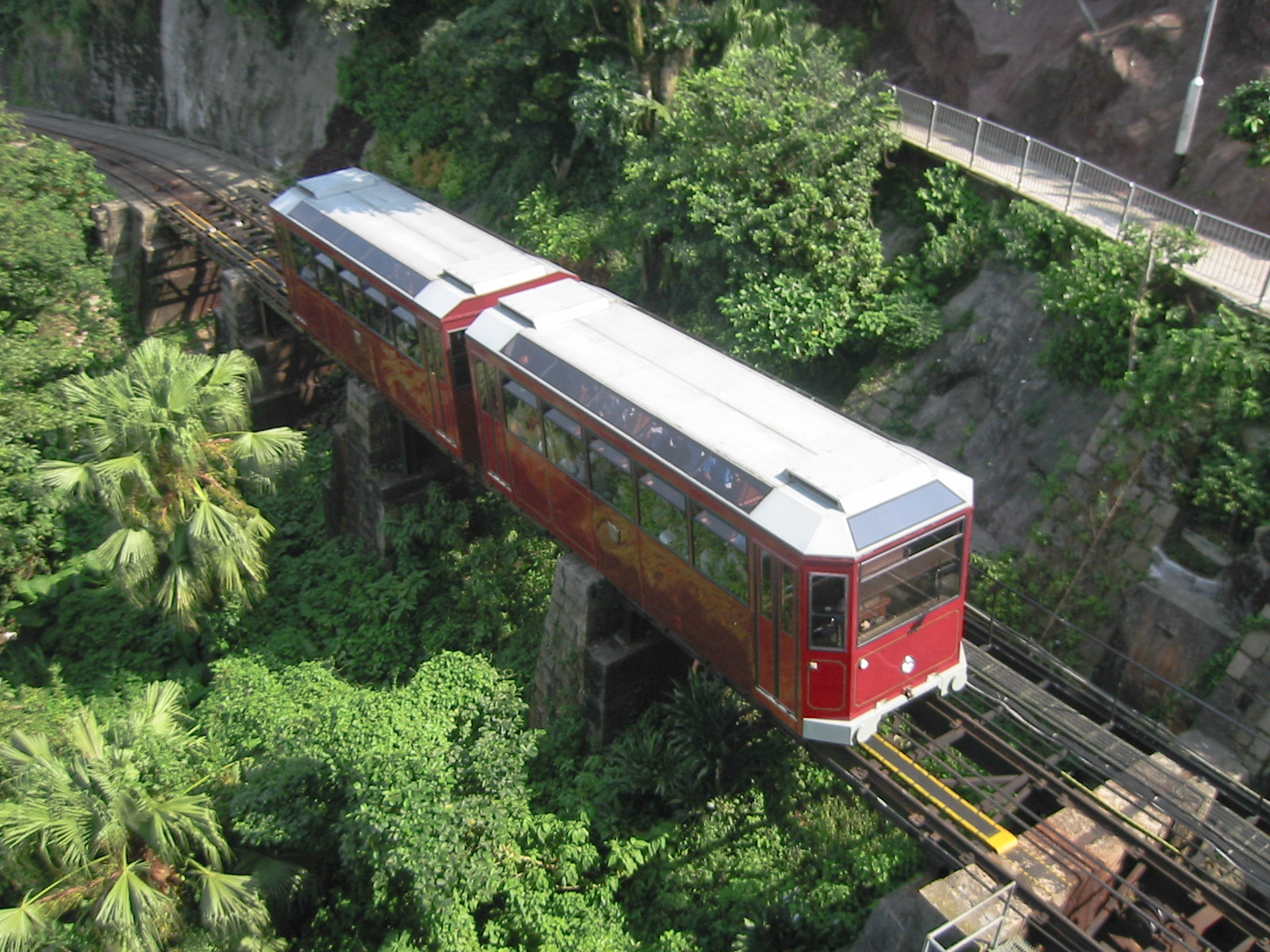
Peak Tram approaching the Peak Tower

With some seven million visitors every year, the Peak is a major tourist attraction of Hong Kong. It has views of the city and its waterfront. The viewing deck also has coin-operated telescopes that the visitors can use to enjoy the cityscape. The number of visitors led to the construction of two major leisure and shopping centres, the Peak Tower and the Peak Galleria, situated adjacent to each other.

The Peak Tower incorporates the upper station of the Peak Tram, the funicular railway that brings passengers up from the St. John's Anglican Cathedral in Hong Kong's Central district, whilst the Peak Galleria incorporates the bus station used by the Hong Kong public buses and green minibuses on the Peak. The Peak is also accessible by taxi and private car via the circuitous Peak Road, or by walking up the steep Old Peak Road from near the Zoological Botanical Gardens or the Central Green Trail from Hong Kong Park. The nearest MTR station is Central.

Victoria Peak Garden is located on the site of Mountain Lodge, the Governor's old summer residence, and is the closest publicly accessible point to the summit. It can be reached from Victoria Gap by walking up Mount Austin Road, a climb of about 150 metres (490 ft). Another popular walk is the level loop along Lugard and Harlech Roads, giving good views of the entire Hong Kong Harbour and Kowloon, as well as Lantau and Lamma Islands, encircling the summit at the level of the Peak Tower.

There are several restaurants on Victoria Peak, most of which are located in the two shopping centres. However, the Peak Lookout Restaurant, is housed in an older and more traditional building which was originally a spacious house for engineers working on the Peak Tramway. It was rebuilt in 1901 as a stop area for sedan chairs, but was re-opened as a restaurant in 1947.

== Official residences ==
The Peak is home to a few other key officials in Hong Kong:

- 19 Severn Road – residence of the Secretary for Justice; built in 1934 for Attorney General of Hong Kong
- Victoria House and Victoria Flats at 15 and 17 Barker Road – the former is residence of the Chief Secretary for Administration; Victoria House was built in 1951 from the site of the former Victoria Hospital (c 1897) for the then Colonial Secretary and Chief Secretary
- Headquarters House 11 Barker Road – residence of the Commander of PLA Forces in Hong Kong and former home of the Commander-in-Chief of British Forces
- Chief Justice's House 18 Gough Hill Road – residence of the Chief Justice of the Court of Final Appeal; formerly built by Robert K. Leigh in 1885-1886 sold in 1904 and renamed Lysholt until 1917 and sold by Ho Kom-tong to government and later became residence for Chief Justice of the Supreme Court of Hong Kong.

== Education ==
Victoria Peak is in Primary One Admission (POA) School Net 11. Within the school net are multiple aided schools (operated independently but funded with government money) and the following government schools: Bonham Road Government Primary School and Li Sing Primary School (李陞小學).

German Swiss International School maintains a campus on Victoria Peak.

== Alternative names ==
Name	Cantonese (Jyutping)	Etymology
太平山頂	Taai^{3}ping^{4}saan^{1} Deng^{2}	Literally "pacific mountain peak" or "mountain peak of great peace"
山頂	Saan^{1} Deng^{2}	Literally "mountain top"; corresponds to the English name "The Peak"
扯旗山	Ce^{2}kei^{4} Saan^{1}	Literally means "flag-raising mountain"
爐峰	Lou^{4} Fung^{1}	Literally means "furnace peak"
維多利亞山	Wai^{4}do^{1}lei^{6}aa^{3} Saan^{1}	A phonetic transliteration of the English name "Victoria Peak"
柯士甸山	O^{1}si^{6}din^{1} Saan^{1}	A phonetic transliteration of the English name "Mount Austin"

== Cityscape ==
Hong Kong day view viewed from The Peak Tower observation deck
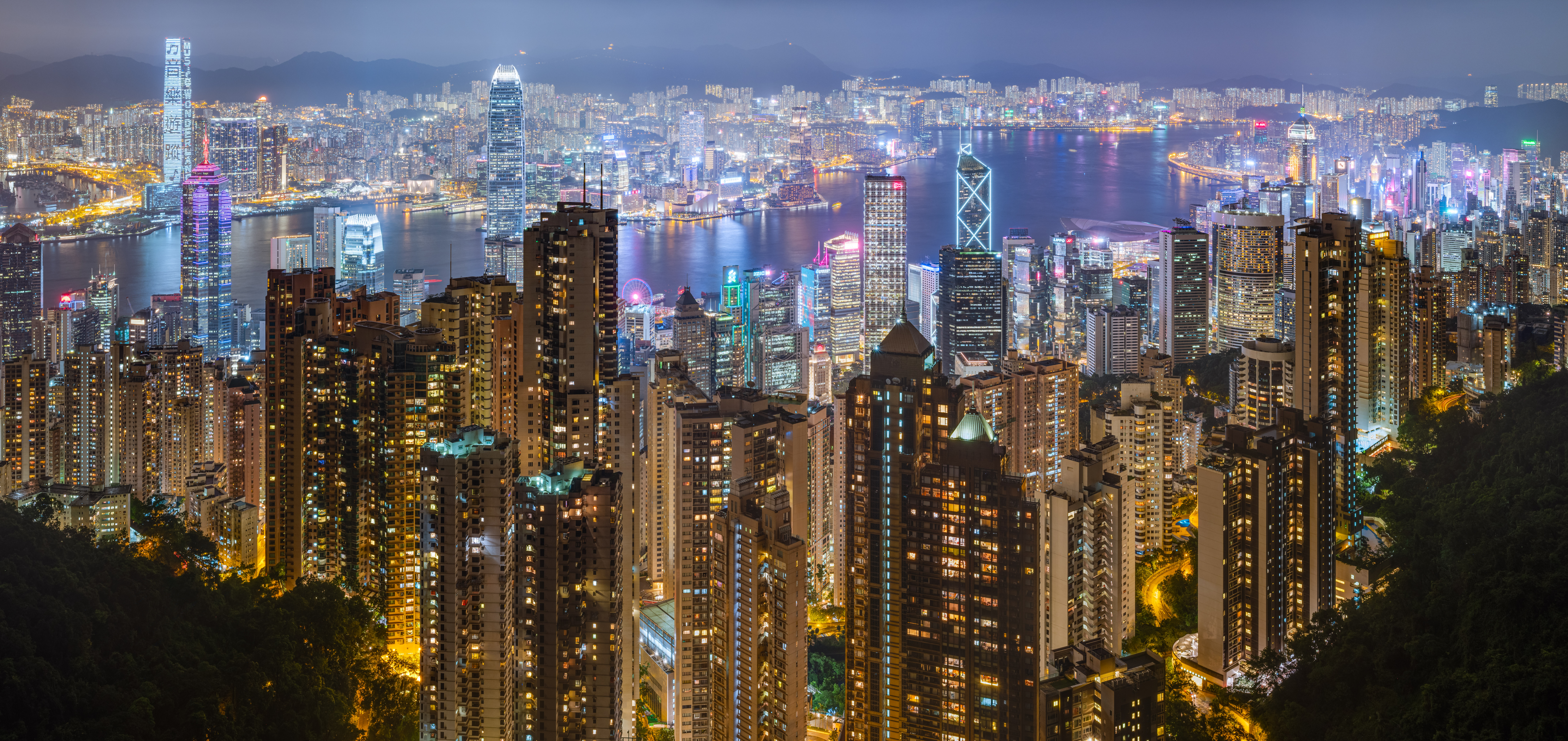
Night view of Victoria Harbour beside Victoria Peak

== Climate ==
Climate data for The Peak, elevation 406 m (1,332 ft), (2004–2020)
Month	Jan	Feb	Mar	Apr	May	Jun	Jul	Aug	Sep	Oct	Nov	Dec	Year
Record high °C (°F)	25.0 (77.0)	28.0 (82.4)	26.9 (80.4)	29.0 (84.2)	32.6 (90.7)	32.7 (90.9)	32.3 (90.1)	32.9 (91.2)	32.1 (89.8)	30.6 (87.1)	28.7 (83.7)	25.5 (77.9)	32.9 (91.2)
Mean daily maximum °C (°F)	16.6 (61.9)	17.8 (64.0)	19.9 (67.8)	22.7 (72.9)	26.0 (78.8)	27.7 (81.9)	28.5 (83.3)	28.5 (83.3)	28.0 (82.4)	25.5 (77.9)	22.1 (71.8)	18.1 (64.6)	23.5 (74.2)
Daily mean °C (°F)	13.6 (56.5)	14.7 (58.5)	16.9 (62.4)	20.1 (68.2)	23.4 (74.1)	25.3 (77.5)	25.9 (78.6)	25.8 (78.4)	25.0 (77.0)	22.5 (72.5)	19.3 (66.7)	15.0 (59.0)	20.6 (69.1)
Mean daily minimum °C (°F)	11.4 (52.5)	12.5 (54.5)	14.8 (58.6)	18.1 (64.6)	21.5 (70.7)	23.7 (74.7)	24.0 (75.2)	23.8 (74.8)	23.2 (73.8)	20.7 (69.3)	17.4 (63.3)	13.0 (55.4)	18.7 (65.6)
Record low °C (°F)	−1.0 (30.2)	4.1 (39.4)	4.9 (40.8)	9.4 (48.9)	13.4 (56.1)	17.9 (64.2)	19.8 (67.6)	20.8 (69.4)	18.1 (64.6)	12.4 (54.3)	6.3 (43.3)	3.5 (38.3)	−1.0 (30.2)
Average precipitation mm (inches)	34.3 (1.35)	35.4 (1.39)	71.8 (2.83)	130.1 (5.12)	317.1 (12.48)	442.5 (17.42)	359.1 (14.14)	382.3 (15.05)	273.5 (10.77)	103.7 (4.08)	44.8 (1.76)	30.8 (1.21)	2,225.4 (87.6)
Average rainy days (≥ 0.5 mm)	6.1	9.0	9.8	11.0	14.0	18.4	17.3	15.7	13.6	7.1	6.0	5.1	133.1
Source: Hong Kong Observatory (rainy days 2004-2017)

== See also ==
- List of places in Hong Kong
- List of mountains, peaks and hills in Hong Kong
- List of places named after Queen Victoria
- The Peak Hotel, a hotel located on Victoria Peak from 1888 to 1936
- Peak District Reservation Ordinance 1904
- Tourism in Hong Kong
