= Lugard Road =

Walking path in Hong Kong

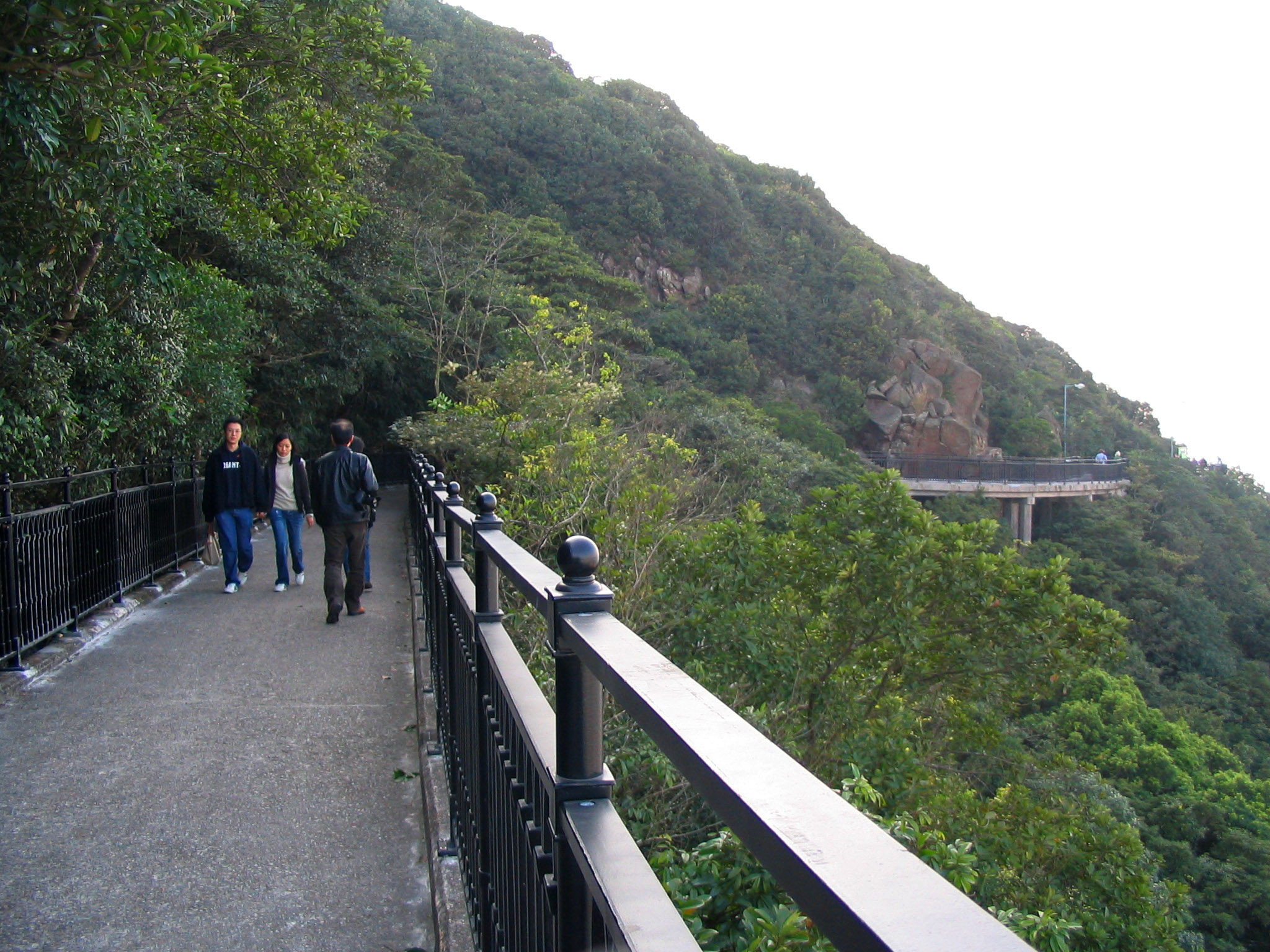
- Lugard Road, elevated section in background
- Interactive map of Lugard Road
- Native name: 盧吉道 (Yue Chinese)
- Namesake: Sir Frederick Lugard
- Length: 2,462 metres (8,076 ft)
- Width: 2.4 metres (8 ft)
- Location: Victoria Peak, Hong Kong

Construction
- Construction start: June 1913; 113 years ago
- Completed: March 1921; 105 years ago

Lugard Road
- Traditional Chinese: 盧吉道
Transcriptions
Yue: Cantonese
- Yale Romanization: Lòuh gāt douh
- Jyutping: Lou4 gat1 dou6
- Sidney Lau: Lo4 gat1 do6

Lugard Road (Chinese: 盧吉道; Jyutping: lou4 gat1 dou6) is a road located on Victoria Peak, Hong Kong, named after Sir Frederick Lugard (later Lord Lugard), Governor of Hong Kong from 1907 to 1912. Located some 400 metres (1,300 ft) above sea level, the road is a popular walking path that forms part of the Hong Kong Trail, and is known for its spectacular vistas over Victoria Harbour.

== Description ==
Lugard Road lies approximately 400 m (1,300 ft) above sea level. It is a semi-circular 2.4-kilometre (1.5 mi) road on Victoria Peak that mainly follows the contours of the hillside, connecting Victoria Gap in the east with the Hatton Road-Harlech Road junction in the west. Joining Harlech Road seamlessly at its end, a circuit is formed around The Peak. Lugard Road is the initial section of Stage 1 of the 50-kilometre (31 mi) Hong Kong Trail. Most of Lugard Road enjoys dense tree cover, and a variety of tropical vegetation can be found along its length. The views of the city below from Lugard Road are variously described in travel guides as "stunning" and "spectacular".

The road is approximately 3 metres (9.8 ft) wide at its widest, and less than 2 metres (6 ft 7 in) at its narrowest, and – while not entirely pedestrianised – has vehicular restrictions. Permits to use this road are only issued to residents for access to their properties.

== History ==
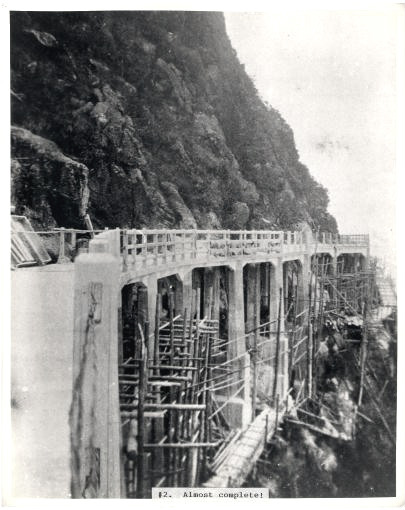
Piered section of Lugard Road in the final stages of completion (c.1921)

The road is named after Sir Frederick Lugard, Governor of Hong Kong from 1907 to 1912.

The Public Works Department issued an invitation for sealed tenders by 2 June 1913 to form a section of roadway from Victoria Gap to High West Gap. The cost of the entire 2,462-metre (8,076 ft) road, whose construction was made difficult by the "rocky and precipitous nature of the hillside", was estimated at HK$55,000. In their 1913 annual report, the PWD noted that HK$11,373 had been spent on the 860-metre (2,820 ft) section completed that the year.

[…] the road will be principally used as a promenade, a wonderful panoramic view of the City, Harbour and surroundings being obtainable from it. Starting from Victoria Gap, the road contours the hillside below the Mount Austin Barracks, being practically level until it reaches a point below Bishop’s Lodge, whence it continues westwards with a rising grade of 1 in 18 to the end of the first section. It is 8 feet in width and is generally cut out of the hillside. In some places, it has been necessary to construct retaining walls in order to avoid excessive cutting or to improve the alignment of the road.

The construction was interrupted by the First World War. The next section built after the war, to join the existing road with Harlech Road, is described as having "a minimum width of 8 ft. throughout with a maximum gradient of 1 in 20". It comprises "1,448 lineal feet of reinforced concrete decking and beams carried on 87 cement concrete piers, 1,543 lineal feet of rubble retaining walling and 1,859 lineal feet of hillside benching". In 1920, the Director of Public Works reported that all the substantial pier work for the bridging, rubble retaining walls, cutting and channelling for that section had been completed. The steep terrain hindered progress, and challenges included "numerous dangerous boulders, weighing up to 45 tons each", which had to be removed. By the end of that year, all that remained to be done was "a small amount of work consisting principally of bridge decking, railings, and road surfacing".

Construction was completed in March 1921; the total cost of the project came to HK$88,165.

== Houses ==
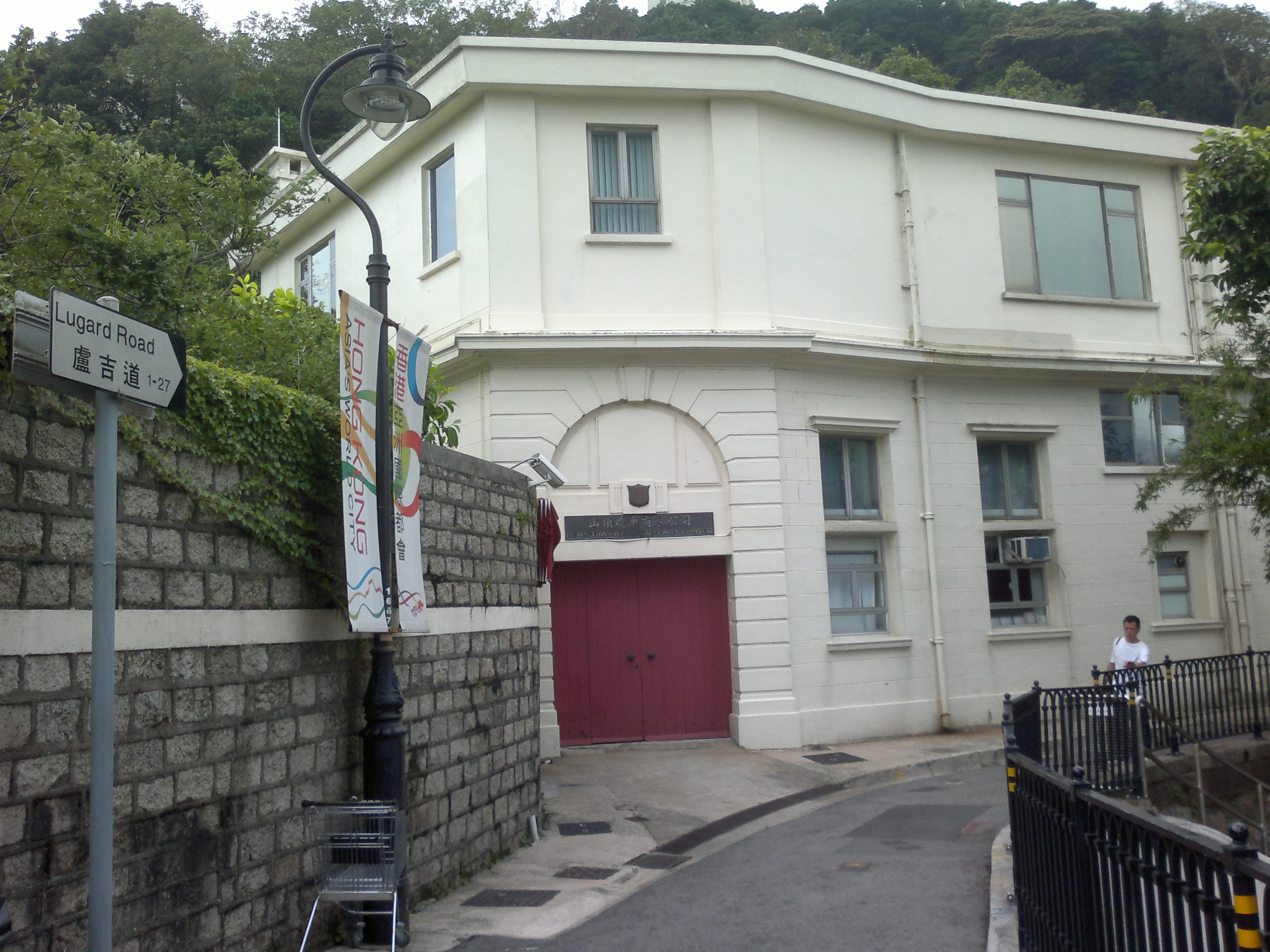
Start of Lugard Road, next to the Peak Tower and The Peak Lookout; the white building is No. 1 Lugard Road.

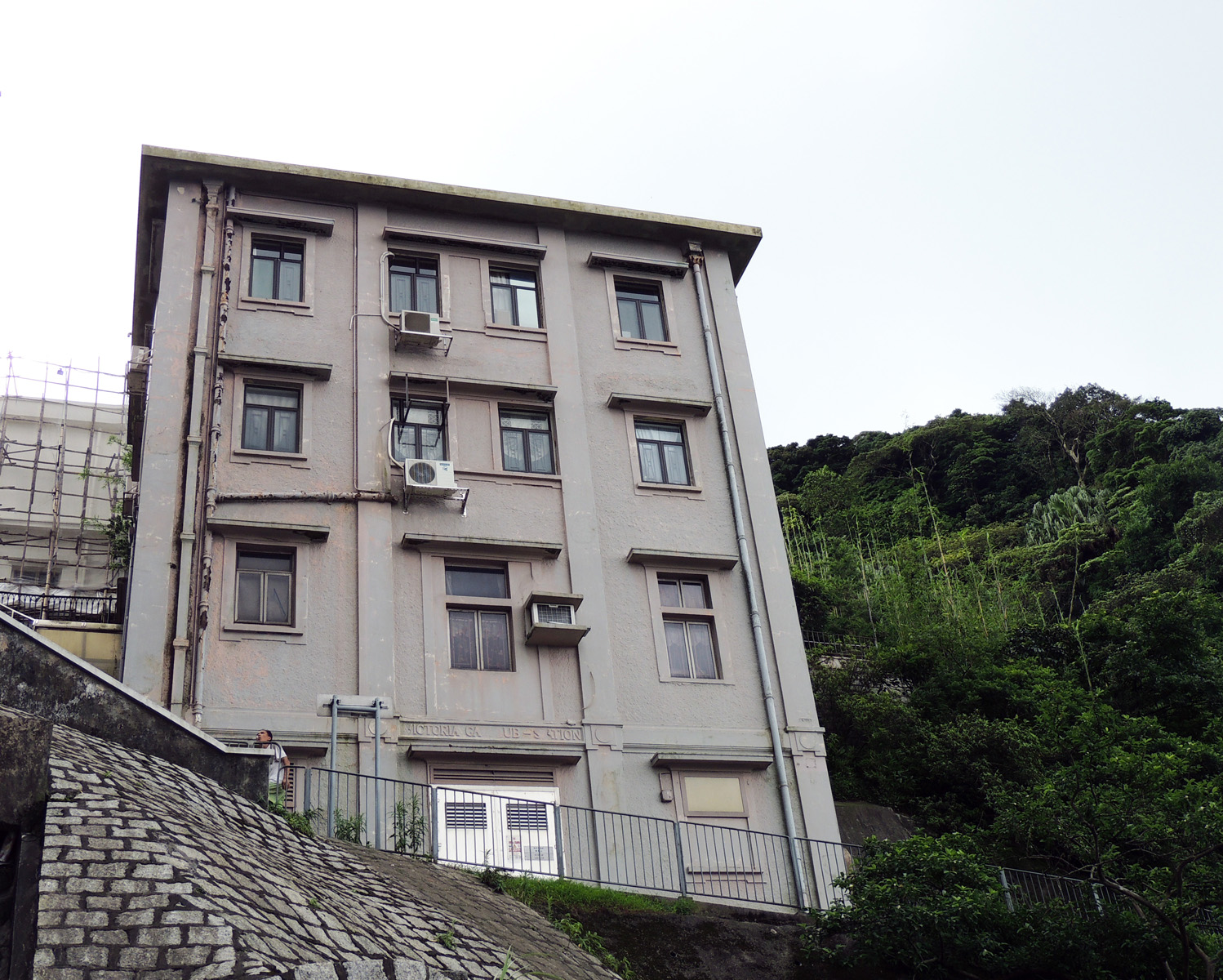
No. 35 Lugard Road, Victoria Gap Substation

While the Peak is a prestigious address, there are few houses along Lugard Road. It is not designed for vehicular traffic, as it is too narrow for cars to pass in most places, making the houses close to inaccessible. Furthermore, the escarpments present challenges for construction: there was controversy when planning permission was lodged (and granted) to convert one of the properties along the road into a luxury hotel in 2013.

=== Built heritage ===
- No. 1 Lugard Road, the Peak Tramways Office, was built in c.1927 as a workshop, with an additional floor added in 1953. It has a highly unusual shape that can best be described as an arrowhead. It was listed as a Grade III historic building in 2010.
- No. 26 Lugard Road. Hong Kong Archive records show that a dwelling was constructed c.1890 on Rural Building Lot 52. The house was sold in 1899 to Joseph Charles Hoare, then Bishop of Victoria, for HK$34,000. The property, thus named "Bishop's Lodge", was owned by Hoare, and passed to his wife upon his drowning in a typhoon in 1906. In 1917, the property was sold for HK$20,830 to Robert Hotung, who surrendered the lease to the Crown in June 1950 – process which usually involved an exchange for other land.
- No. 27 Lugard Road. The oldest house in Lugard Road is this two-storey private residence designed by Palmer and Turner, and constructed in 1914. It was given Grade II historic building status by the Antiquities Advisory Board in September 2013. The neo-classical colonial mansion was designed by Lennox Godfrey Bird, and owned by his brother Herbert until it was sold to the Taikoo Dockyard & Engineering Co. in 1930 whereupon it was used as a residence for their staff. Butterfield & Swire (太古洋行), who were the successor to Taikoo Dockyard, turned the house into a staff mess. In September 2012, the property was acquired for HK$384 million by Ashley Pacific, a company that also owns and runs the Butterfly Hotel and Serviced Apartment Group. The new owners submitted an application to the Town Planning Board (TPB) to transform the property into an upmarket boutique hotel. They proposed to expand the 880 square metres (9,500 sq ft) property by building two additional villas of two to three storeys each, making a total of 17 lettable units with a floor area in excess of 1,100 square metres (12,000 sq ft). Despite stiff objection from local groups and the District Council, the TPB approved the plan.
- No. 28 Lugard Road is a pitched roof bungalow designed by Lennox Bird, and constructed in 1924. It was owned and occupied by Bird up to the war, after which it was sold.
- No. 35 Lugard Road, Victoria Gap Substation, was built in 1928 by the Hongkong Electric Company to distribute electricity to different populated areas, and serve as quarters for its engineers. The 4-storey neo-Georgian building still functions as a staff residence and an electric substation for the locality. The plant is located on the ground floor, with flats on each of the remaining levels. It has been a Grade III historic building since 2010.
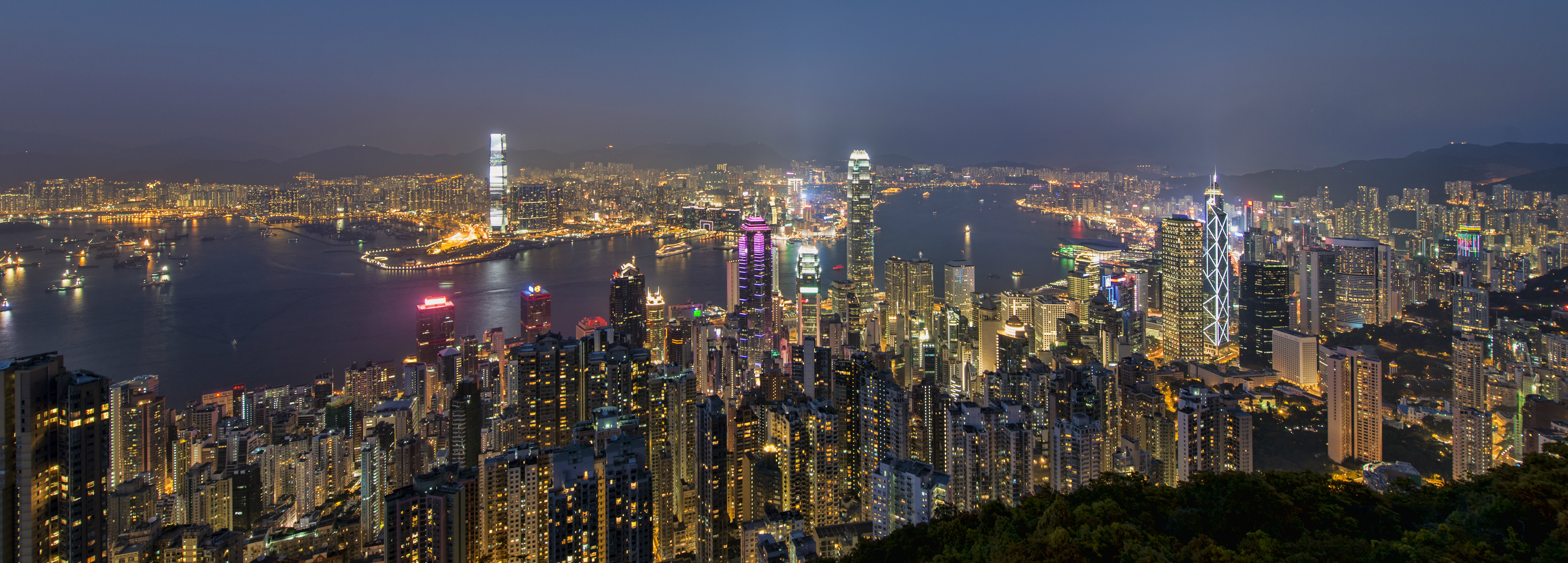
A panoramic view of Hong Kong from Lugard Road

== See also ==
- List of streets and roads in Hong Kong
