= Mount Gough =

Mountain in Hong Kong

- 歌賦山
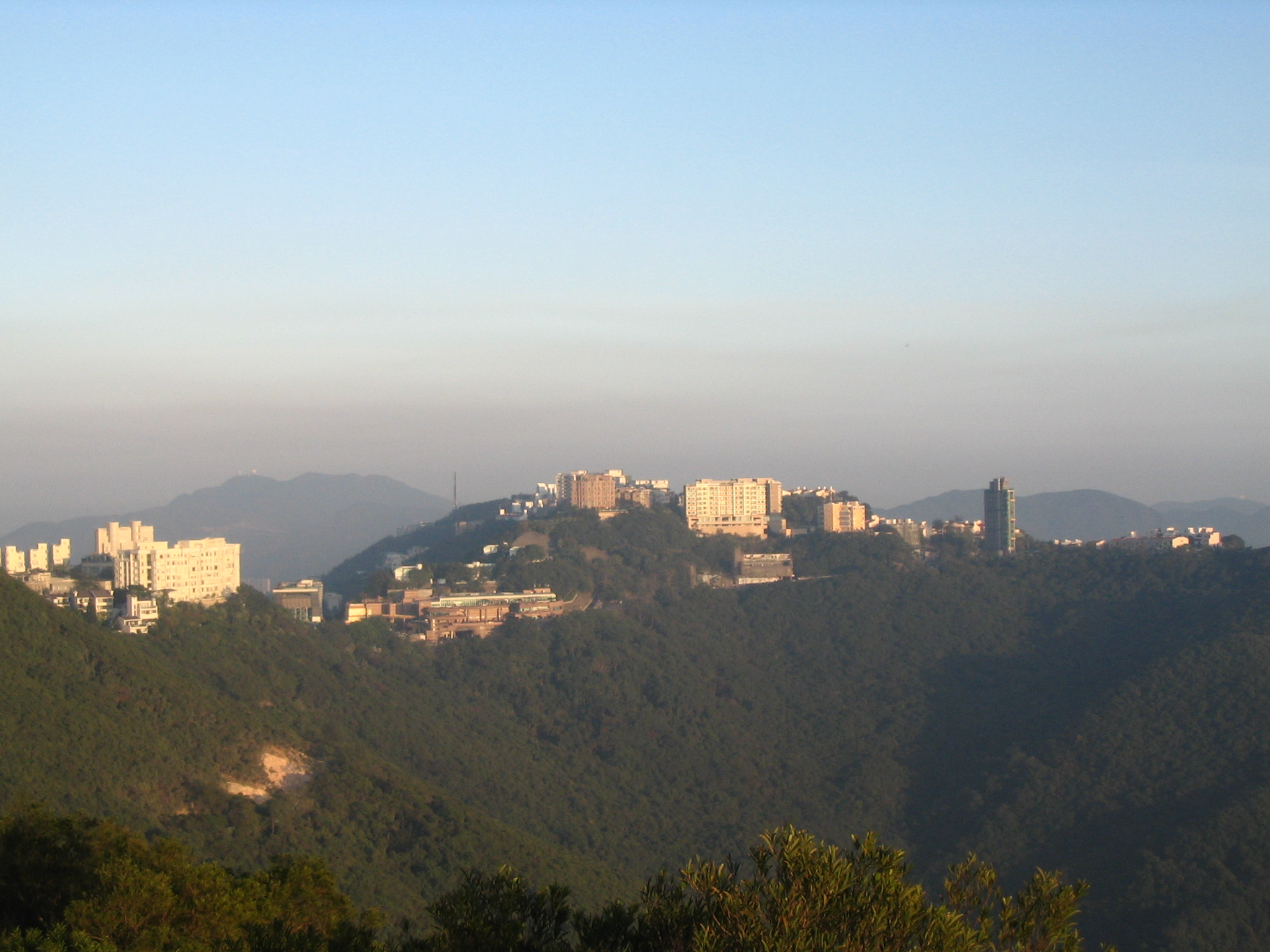
- Mount Gough

Highest point
- Elevation: 479 m (1,572 ft)
- Coordinates: 22°16′07″N 114°09′32″E

Naming
- Native name: 歌賦山 (Chinese)

Geography
- Location within Hong Kong
- Location: Hong Kong Island, Hong Kong

Mount Gough (Chinese: 歌賦山; Jyutping: go1fu3 saan1) is a peak on Hong Kong Island, Hong Kong. It lies directly east of Victoria Peak and rises to a height of 479 metres (1,572 ft) above Admiralty. It is named for Hugh Gough, 1st Viscount Gough, Commander-in-Chief of British Forces in China. The summit is now occupied by a housing complex so is inaccessible to the general public.

== See also ==
- List of mountains, peaks and hills in Hong Kong
- Victoria Peak
- Mount Cameron
