= Mount Austin Road =

Street in Victoria Peak, Hong Kong

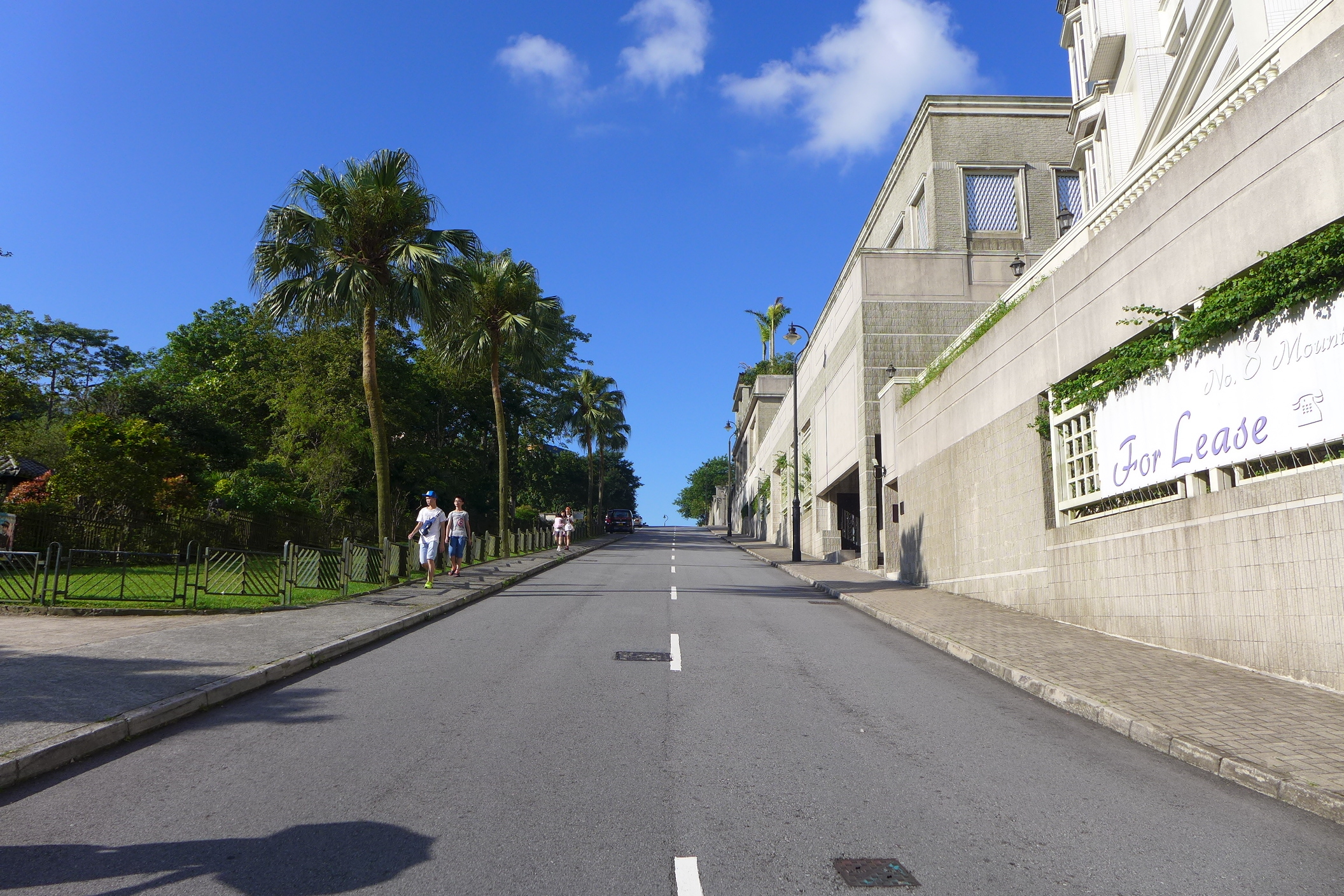
- Interactive map of Mount Austin Road
- Location: Victoria Peak, Hong Kong

Mount Austin Road (Chinese: 柯士甸山道; Jyutping: o1 si6 din6 saan1 dou6) is a road on Hong Kong Island that leads directly to the top of Victoria Peak. It is also the highest road on Hong Kong Island, with an altitude of about 540 meters.

The entire route is a single-lane, two-way road, and it goes up a slope. The intersection of Mount Austin Road is west of the Peak Tower (凌霄閣) in Victoria Gap (爐峰峽). Along the way, it passes the Mount Austin Recreation Ground, the Guard Room of the Old Governor's Peak Villa, the Peak Park, and ends at the Radio Station. Along Mount Austin Road there are the residential properties Chu Wan (岫雲), Mount Austin Estate (山景花園別墅), 8 Mount Austin Road, Victoria Peak Garden (山頂花園), Haystack (耕雲草廬) and Overthorpe (豐林閣).

== Features ==
=== Viewing Pavilion at 8 Mount Austin Road ===
On the north side of No. 8 Mount Austin Road, towards the junction of No. 26C Lugard Road, there is a popular tourist spot for pictures. From this point, there is a view of all the buildings in Wan Chai, Causeway Bay and North Point, including Hopewell Centre, Central Plaza and Victoria Harbour, as well as Tsim Sha Tsui and Hung Hom on the Kowloon Peninsula.

=== Mount Austin Playground ===
Located on the top of the mountain, far away from the hustle and bustle of the city, it is the back garden of the former Governor of Hong Kong. Mount Austin Playground is the only European-style garden in Hong Kong, with red-brick washrooms and European-style imitation gas lamps.

=== Gate Lodge ===
The Old Governor's summer residence, Mountain Lodge, was built between 1900 and 1902, modeled after the architectural style of a Scottish mansion. It was described by the media at the time as ‘the most imposing and handsome architecture on The Peak’. The old Governor's summer residence was finally demolished in 1946, leaving only this guardhouse (Gate Lodge).

== Gallery ==
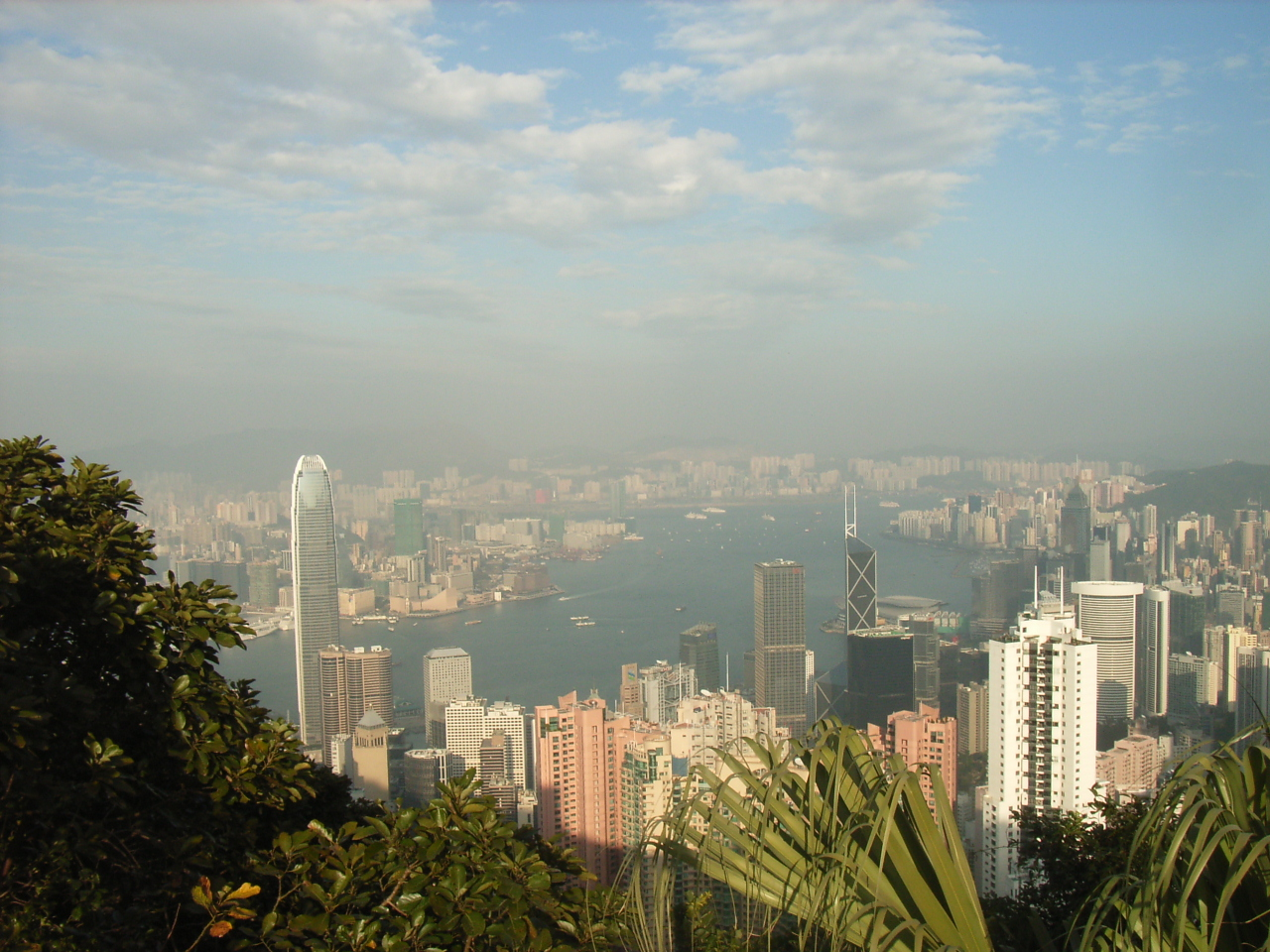
The view from the viewing pavilion in the middle of Mount Austin Road

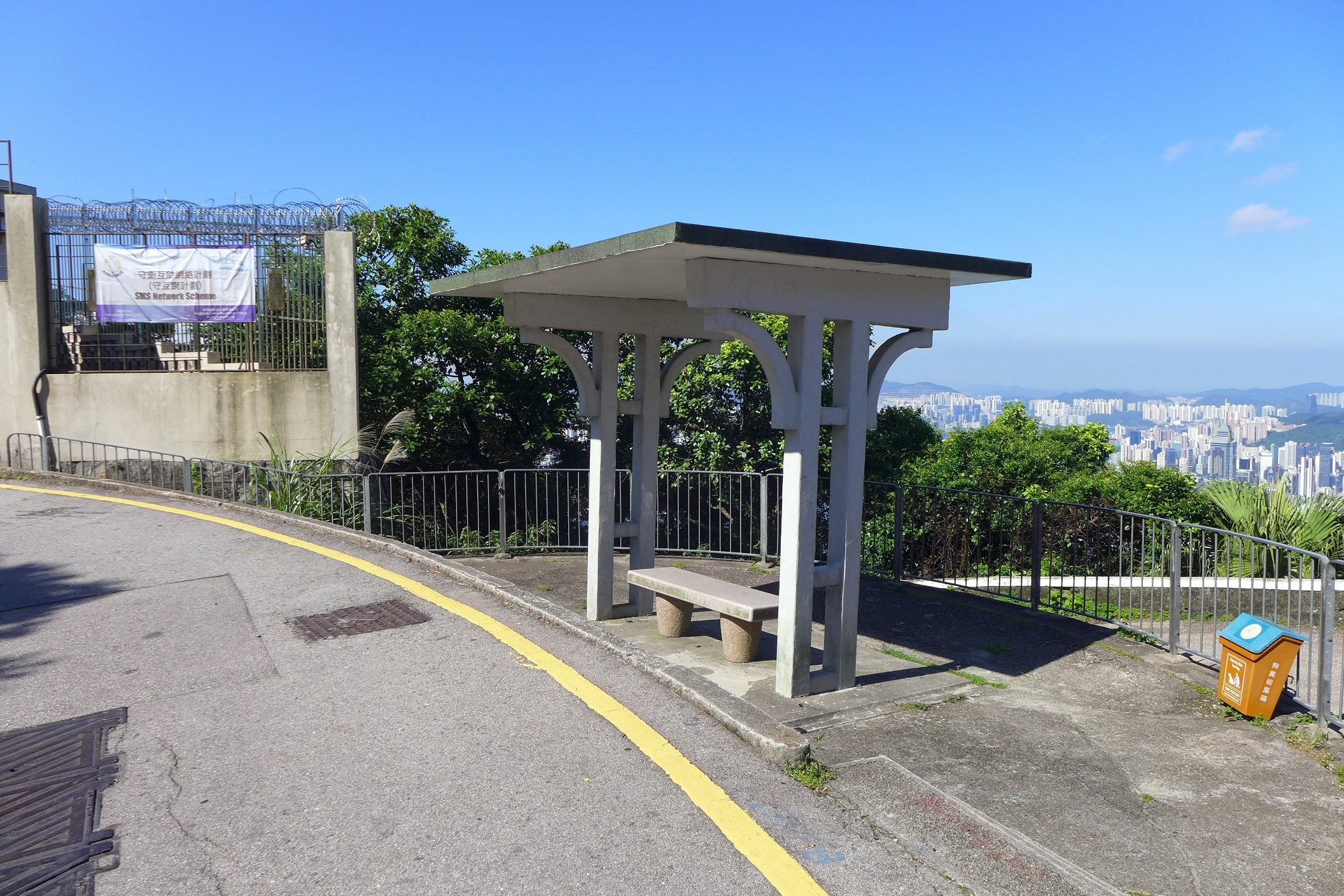
Viewing Pavilion at 8 Mount Austin Road

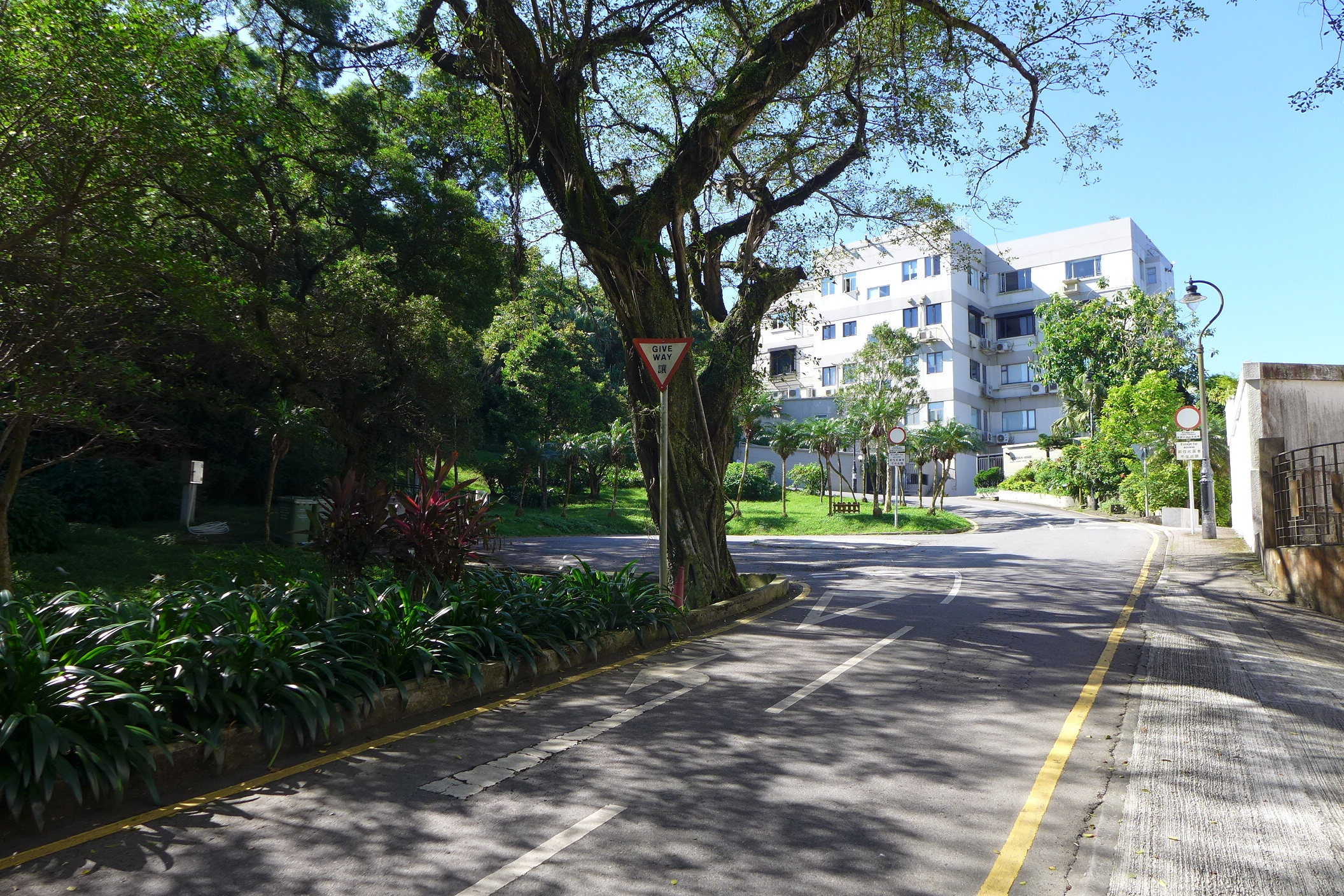
Near 22 Mount Austin Road

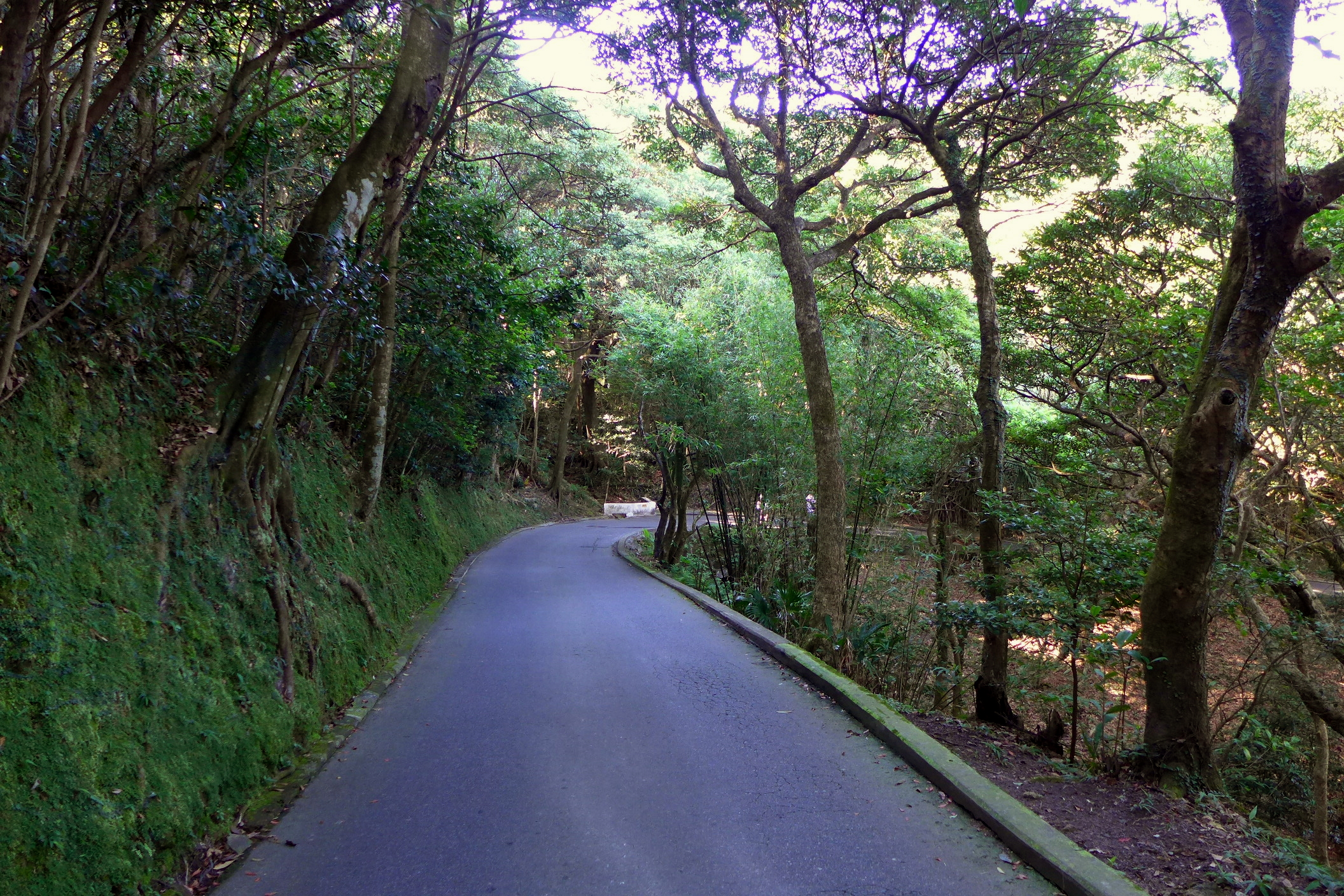
Mount Austin Road near Peak Park

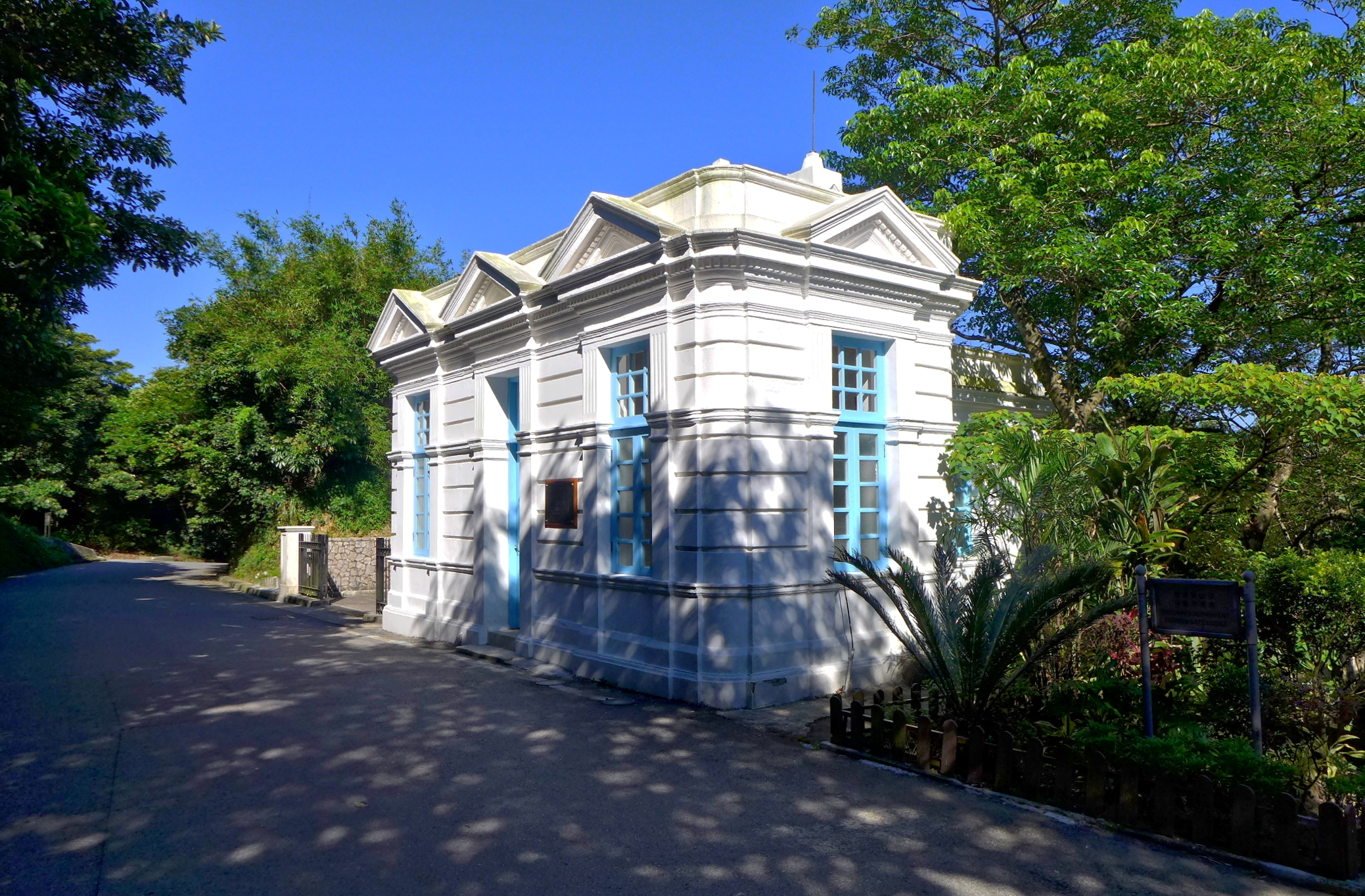
Gate Lodge

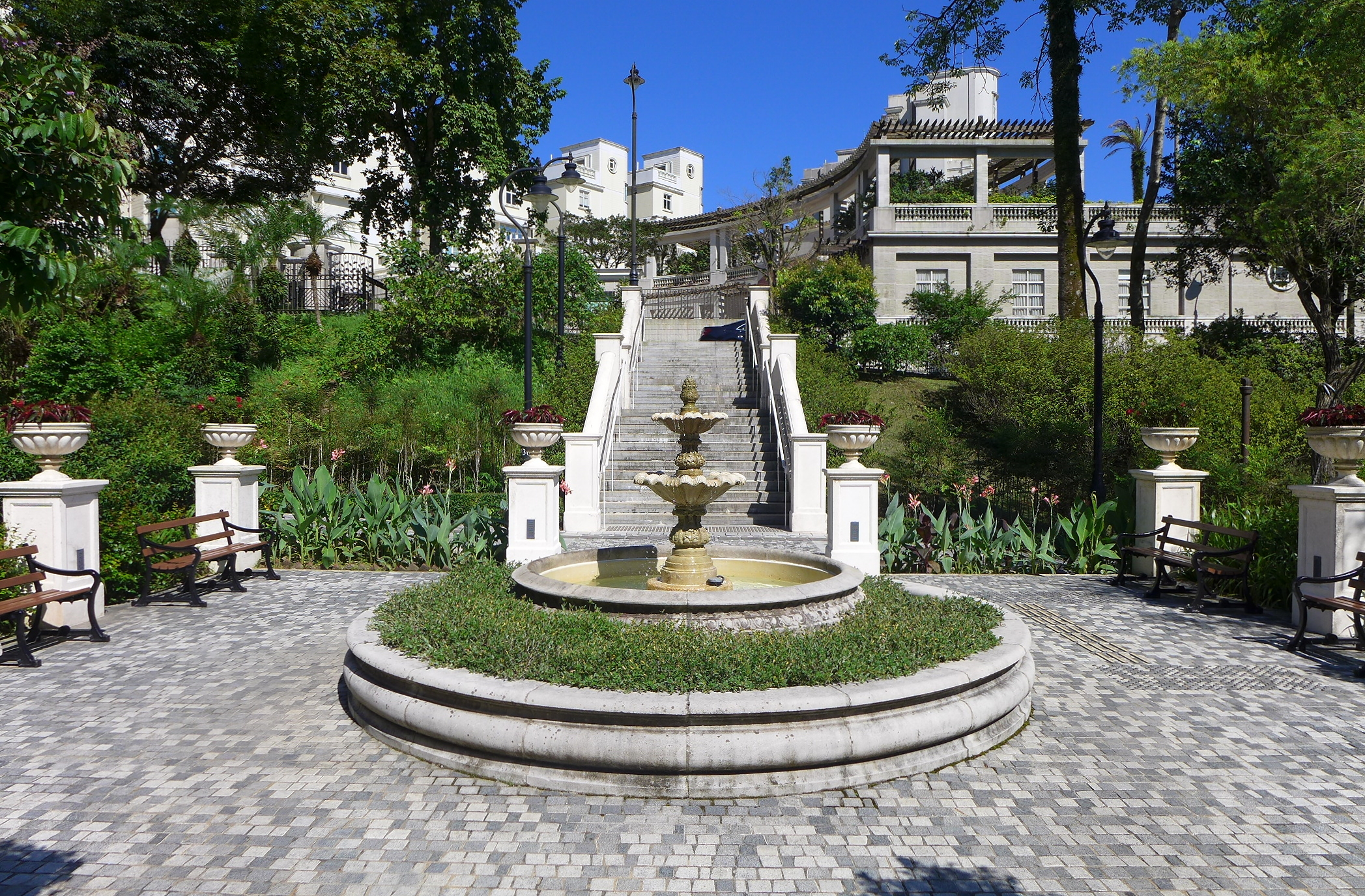
Mount Austin Road Playground Fountain

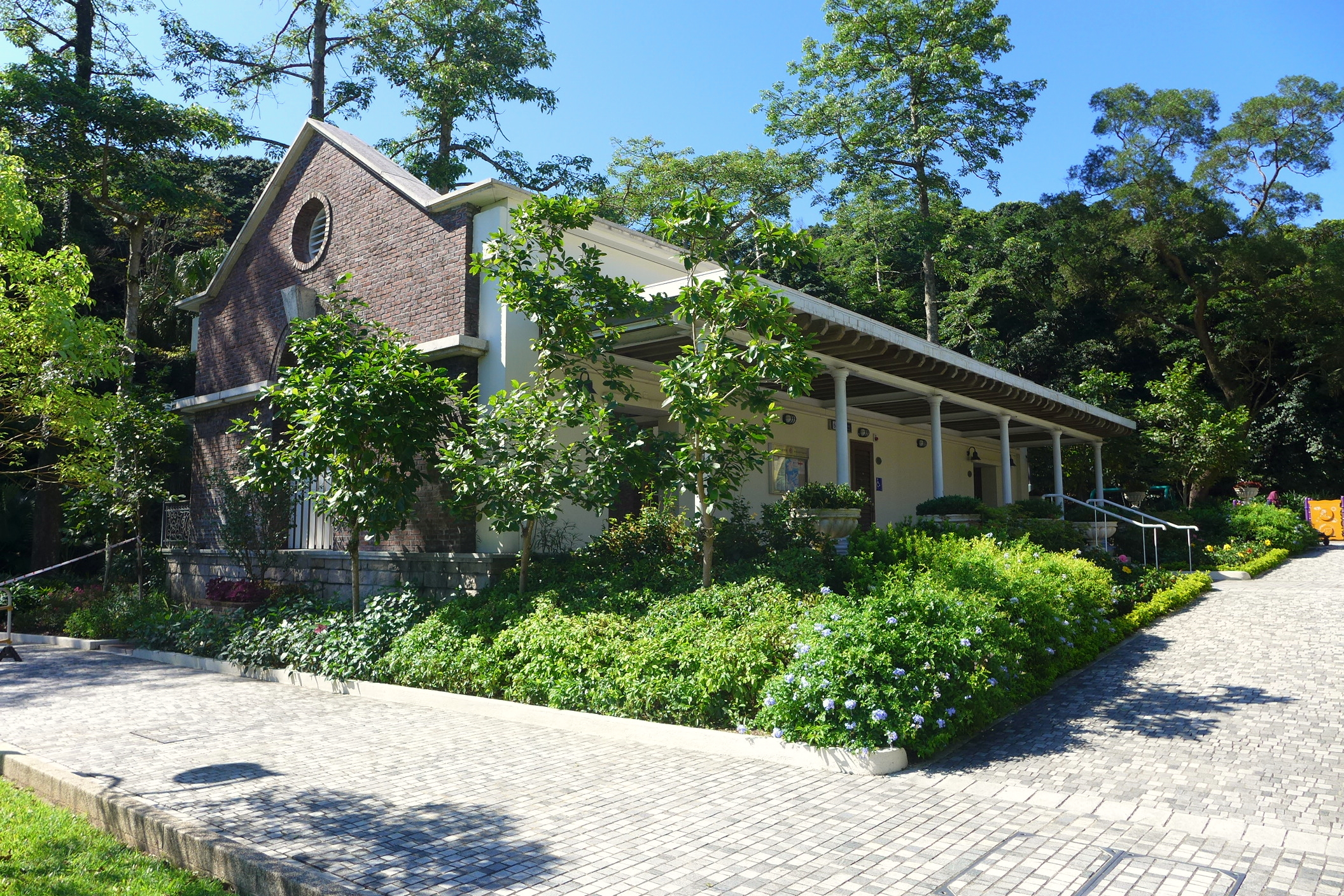
Mount Austin Road Playground Washroom
