= May Road stop =

Railway Station in Hong Kong

Coordinates: 22.273363°N 114.155934°E

May Road 梅道
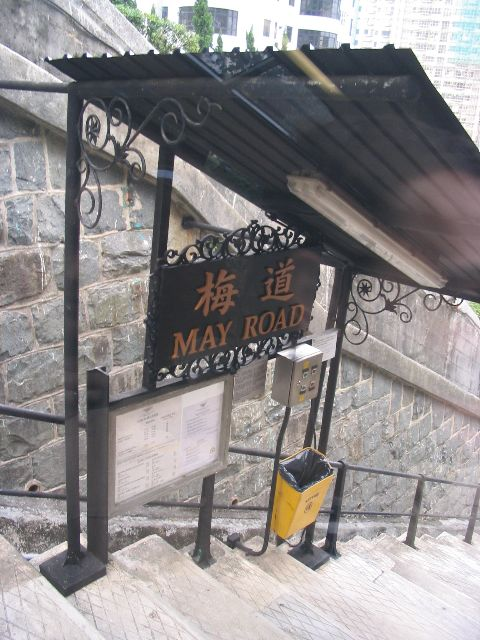
- Previous May Road station

General information
- Location: May Road, Mid-Levels; Central and Western District; Hong Kong
- Elevation: 180 metres (590 ft)
- Line: Peak Tram
- Platforms: 1 side platform
- Tracks: 1

History
- Opened: 30 May 1888; 138 years ago

Services
Preceding stop	The Peninsula Hotels	Following stop
MacDonnell Road towards Central Terminus	Peak Tram	Barker Road towards The Peak Terminus
Location

May Road (Chinese: 梅道; Jyutping: mui4 dou6) is an intermediate station on the Peak Tram funicular railway line. It is located on May Road at Mid-Levels, Central and Western District, Hong Kong, 180 m above sea level and is named after Francis Henry May, the 15th Governor of Hong Kong.

The station comprises a single platform on the western side of the single track. May Road passes over the tramway (at its steepest point) on a bridge at the downhill end of the station, with a passing loop at the Victoria Peak end allowing uphill and downhill trams to pass each other.

Because the station is located in a high-income residential area, where most residents have their own private cars, patronage of the station is relatively low. The station is a request stop at which tram cars will stop only if passengers have pressed the request button inside the tramcar or at the station. No ticketing equipment is provided on the platform.

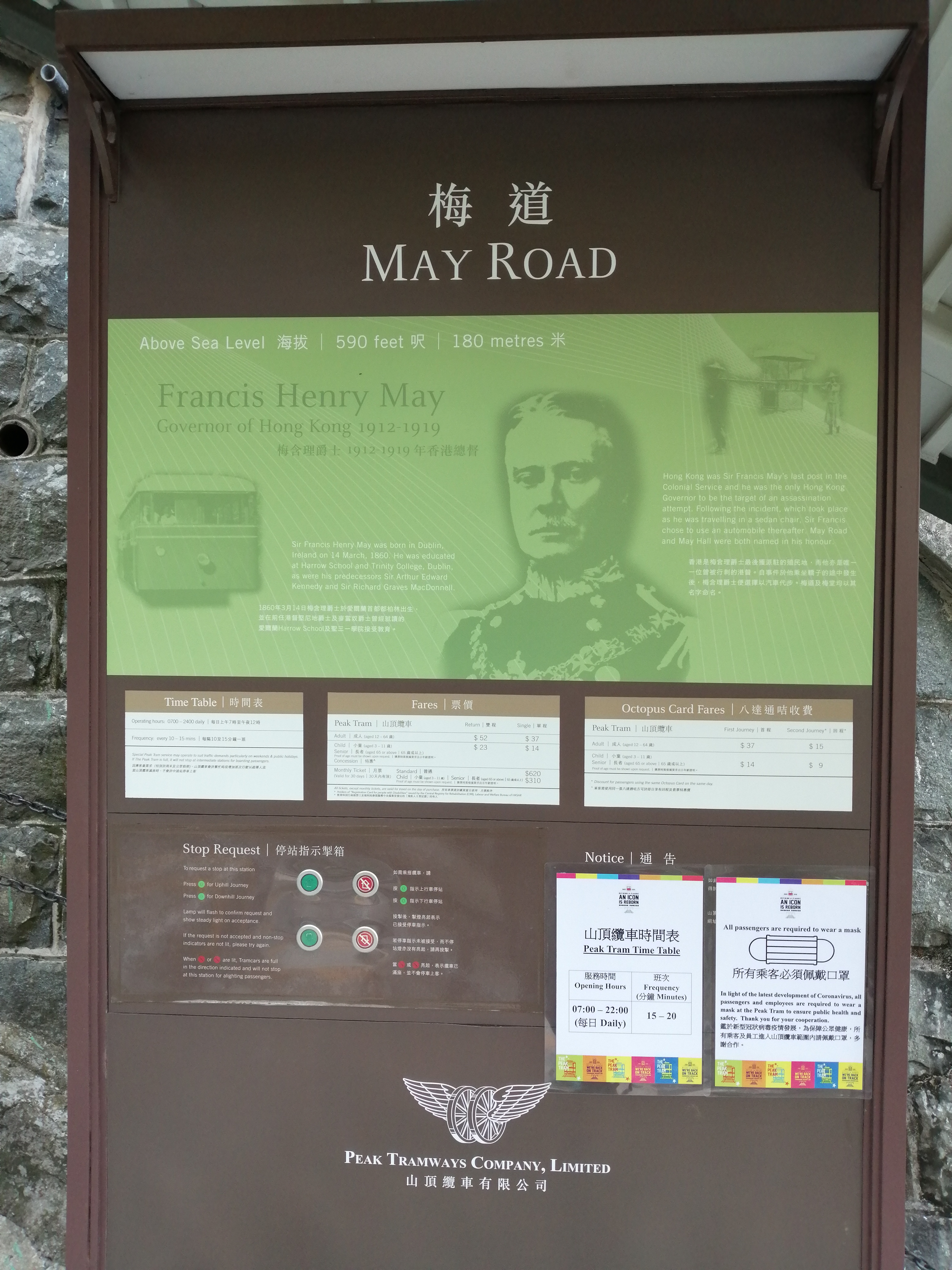
A closeup of the May Road Peak Tram station information board
