= MacDonnell Road stop =

Funicular station on Hong Kong's Peak Tram

Coordinates: 22.275128°N 114.157133°E

MacDonnell Road 麥當勞道
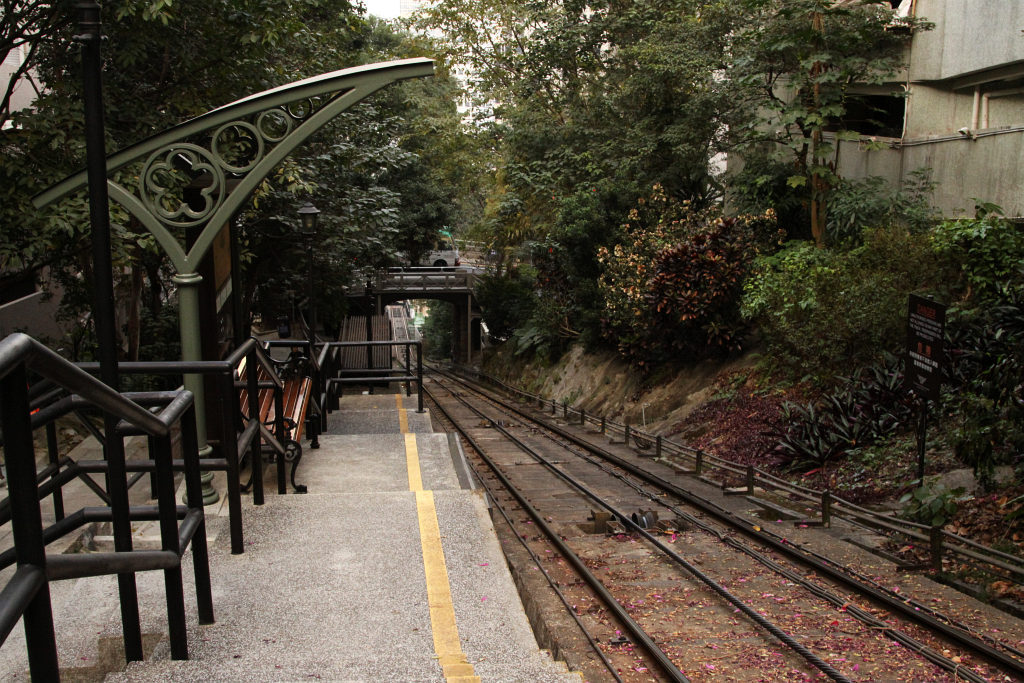
- Looking downhill MacDonnell Road station in December 2010

General information
- Location: MacDonnell Road, Mid-Levels; Central and Western District; Hong Kong
- Elevation: 95 metres (312 ft)
- Line: Peak Tram
- Platforms: 1 side platform
- Tracks: 1

History
- Opened: 30 May 1888; 138 years ago

Services
Preceding stop	The Peninsula Hotels	Following stop
Kennedy Road towards Central Terminus	Peak Tram	May Road towards The Peak Terminus
Location

MacDonnell Road is an intermediate station on the Peak Tram. It is located on MacDonnell Road, in Mid-Levels, Hong Kong, 95 metres above sea level.

The station comprises a single platform on the western side of the single track. MacDonnell Road passes over the tramway at the downhill end of the station on a stone arch bridge, with the Magazine Gap Road overpass at the uphill end.

The station is a request stop at which tram cars will stop only if passengers have pressed the request button inside the tramcar or at the station. No ticketing equipment is provided on the platform.
