= Headquarters House =

Headquarters House may refer to:

== Hong Kong ==
- Headquarters House (Hong Kong), Commander of British Forces Hong Kong

== Jamaica ==
- Hibbert House, also known as Headquarters House, head office of the Jamaica National Heritage Trust

== United States ==
- Headquarters House (Fayetteville, Arkansas), listed on the NRHP in Washington County, Arkansas
- Garden Club of Georgia Museum-Headquarters House, Founder's Memorial Garden, Athens, Georgia, listed on the NRHP in Clarke County, Georgia
- Headquarters House (Boston), a National Historic Landmark listed on the NRHP
