= Barker Road stop =

Funicular station on Hong Kong's Peak Tram

Barker Road 白加道
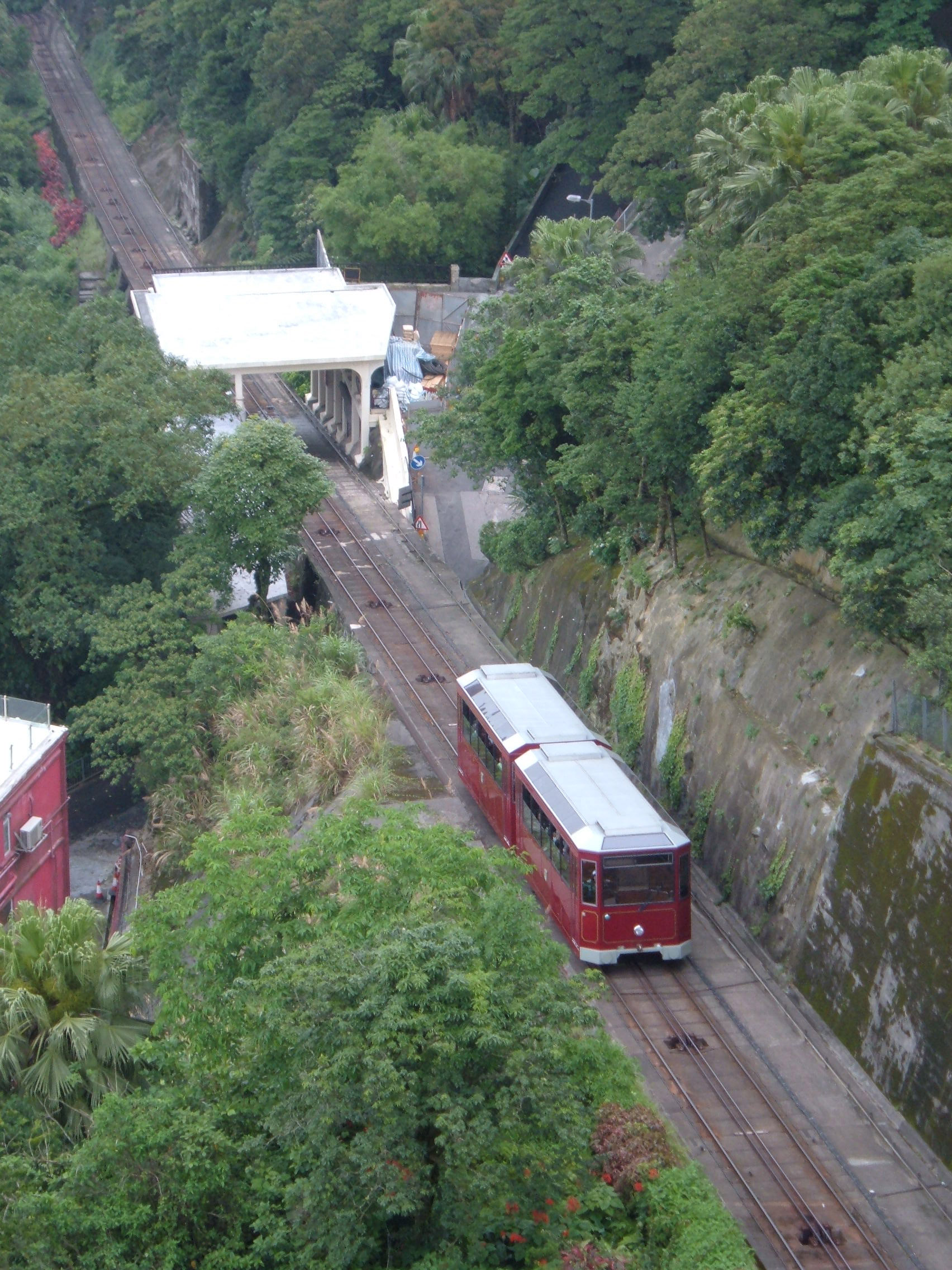
- Aerial view of Barker Road station in 2007

General information
- Location: The Peak, Central and Western District; Hong Kong
- Coordinates: 22.271008°N 114.151675°E
- Elevation: 363 metres (1,191 ft)
- Line: Peak Tram
- Platforms: 1 side platform
- Tracks: 1

History
- Opened: 30 May 1888; 138 years ago

Services
Preceding stop	The Peninsula Hotels	Following stop
May Road towards Central Terminus	Peak Tram	The Peak Terminus Terminus
Location

Barker Road (Chinese: 白加道; Jyutping: baak6 gaa1 dou6) is an intermediate station on the Peak Tram funicular railway line, and is located on Barker Road in the Peak, Central and Western District, Hong Kong, 363 metres (1,191 ft) above sea level. The station opened in 1888 along with the tramline. At this time it was named Plantation Road station as Barker Road was built not before 1898. Today, Barker Road itself passes under the tramway at the uphill end of the station on a bridge.

The station comprises a single platform on the western side of the single track. Barker Road is the only intermediate station to have a 'proper' station building, with a concrete roof covering the platform and track. This roof was not there from the start but was built in 1919. All other stations only have a small shelter on the platform.

Because the station is located in a high-income residential area, where most residents own a car, its patronage is relatively low. The station is a request stop at which tram cars will stop only if passengers have pressed the request button inside the tramcar or at the station. This facility is often unavailable during Sundays and Statutory Holidays, due to the increased demand on the tramway as a whole. No ticketing equipment is provided on the platform.

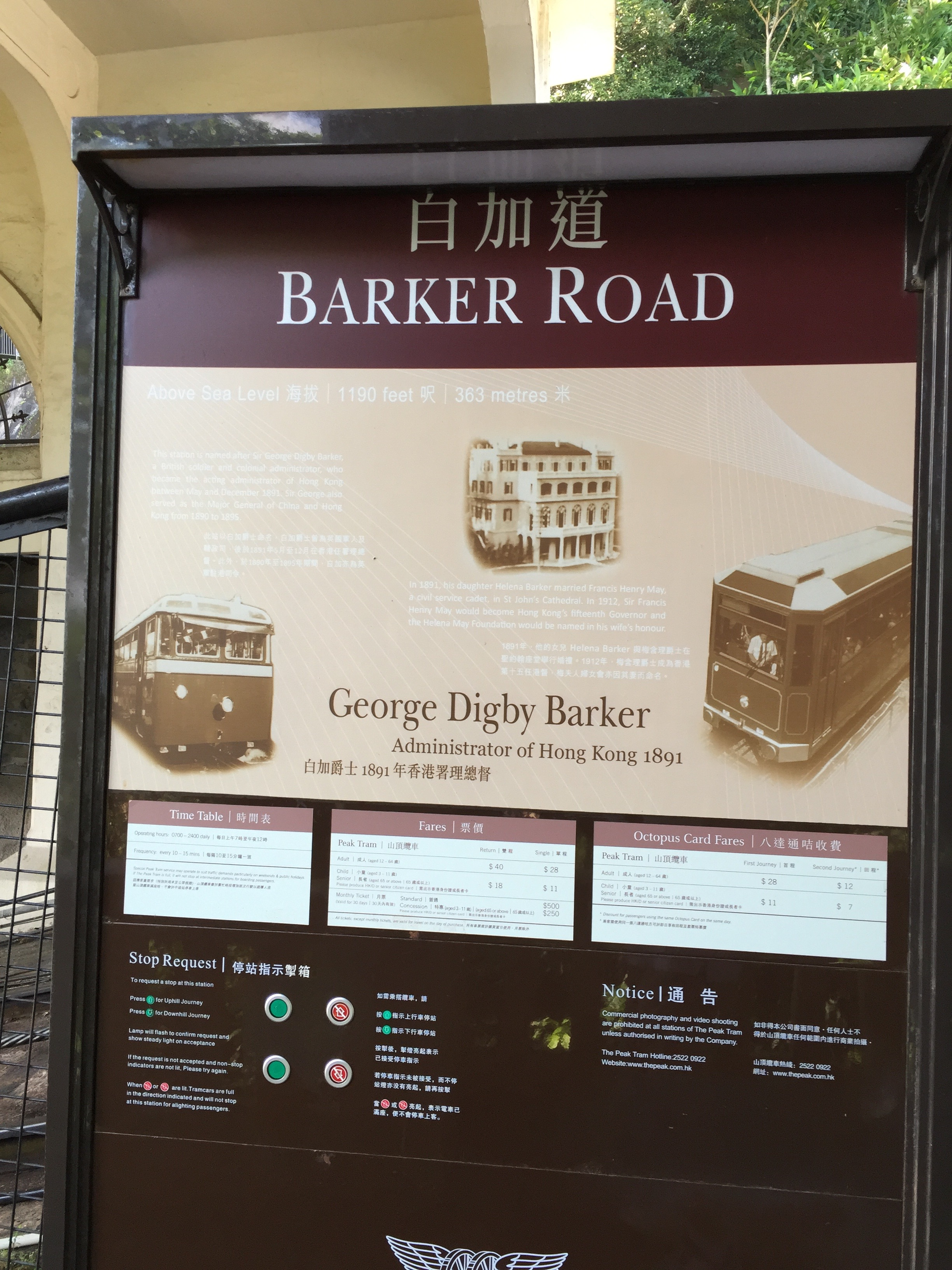
A close-up of the Barker Road Peak Tram station information board

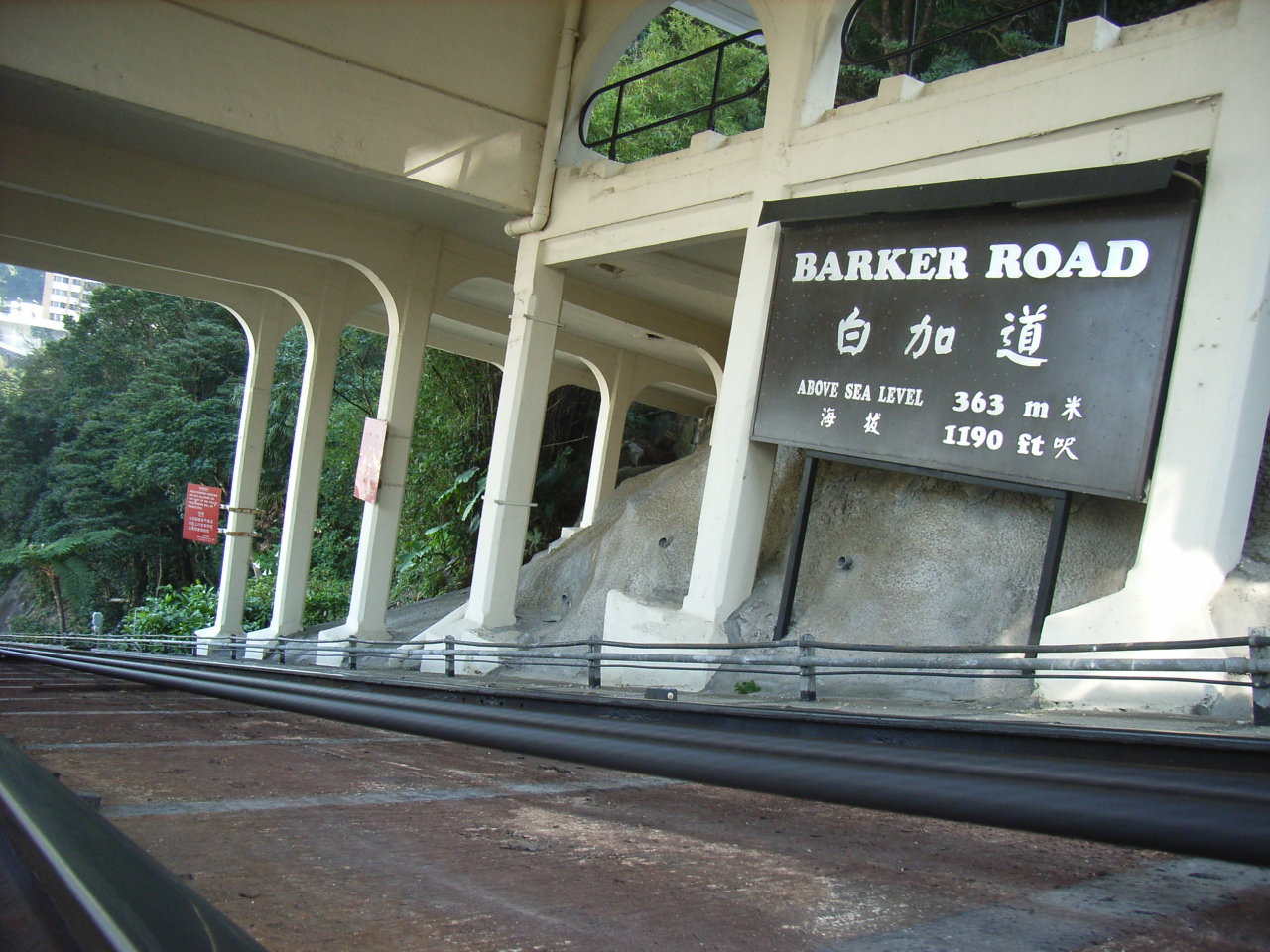
Previous Barker Road station signage

== Neighbouring landmarks ==
- Barker Road
- Old Peak Road
- Plantation Road
- Findlay Road
- Lions Pavilion
