= Peak Tram =

Funicular railway on Hong Kong Island, Hong Kong

Coordinates: 22°16′19.36″N 114°9′17.52″E

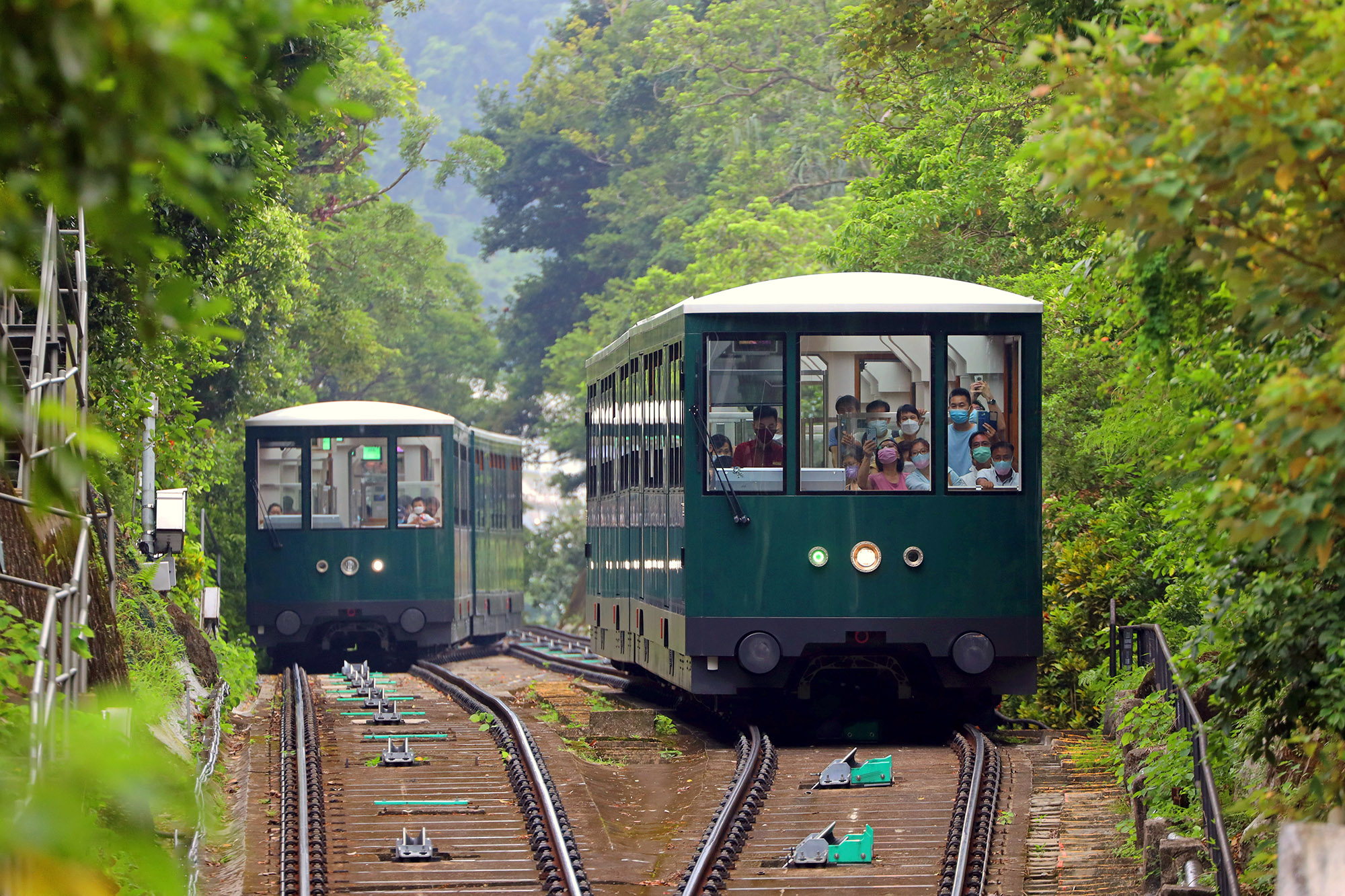
- Sixth generation Peak Tram cars at the passing loop

Overview
- Locale: Hong Kong
- Transit type: Funicular railway
- Number of stations: 6
- Daily ridership: About 17,000

Operation
- Began operation: 30 May 1888; 138 years ago
- Operator: Hongkong and Shanghai Hotels

Technical
- System length: 1.365 kilometres (0.848 mi)
- Track gauge: 1,520 mm (4 ft 11 27/32 in) Russian gauge

The Peak Tram is a funicular railway in Hong Kong, which carries both tourists and residents to the upper levels of Hong Kong Island. Running from Garden Road Admiralty to Victoria Peak via the Mid-Levels, it provides the most direct route and offers good views over the harbour and skyscrapers of Hong Kong. Operated since 1888, it was the first funicular railway in Asia.

The Peak Tram is owned and operated by Hongkong and Shanghai Hotels (HSH), the owner of Hong Kong's Peninsula Hotel along with other properties. The line, along with HSH's Peak Tower leisure complex at the line's summit, is promoted using the brand The Peak. After a lengthy renovation and upgrade project, the Peak Tram reopened on 27 August 2022.

== Route ==
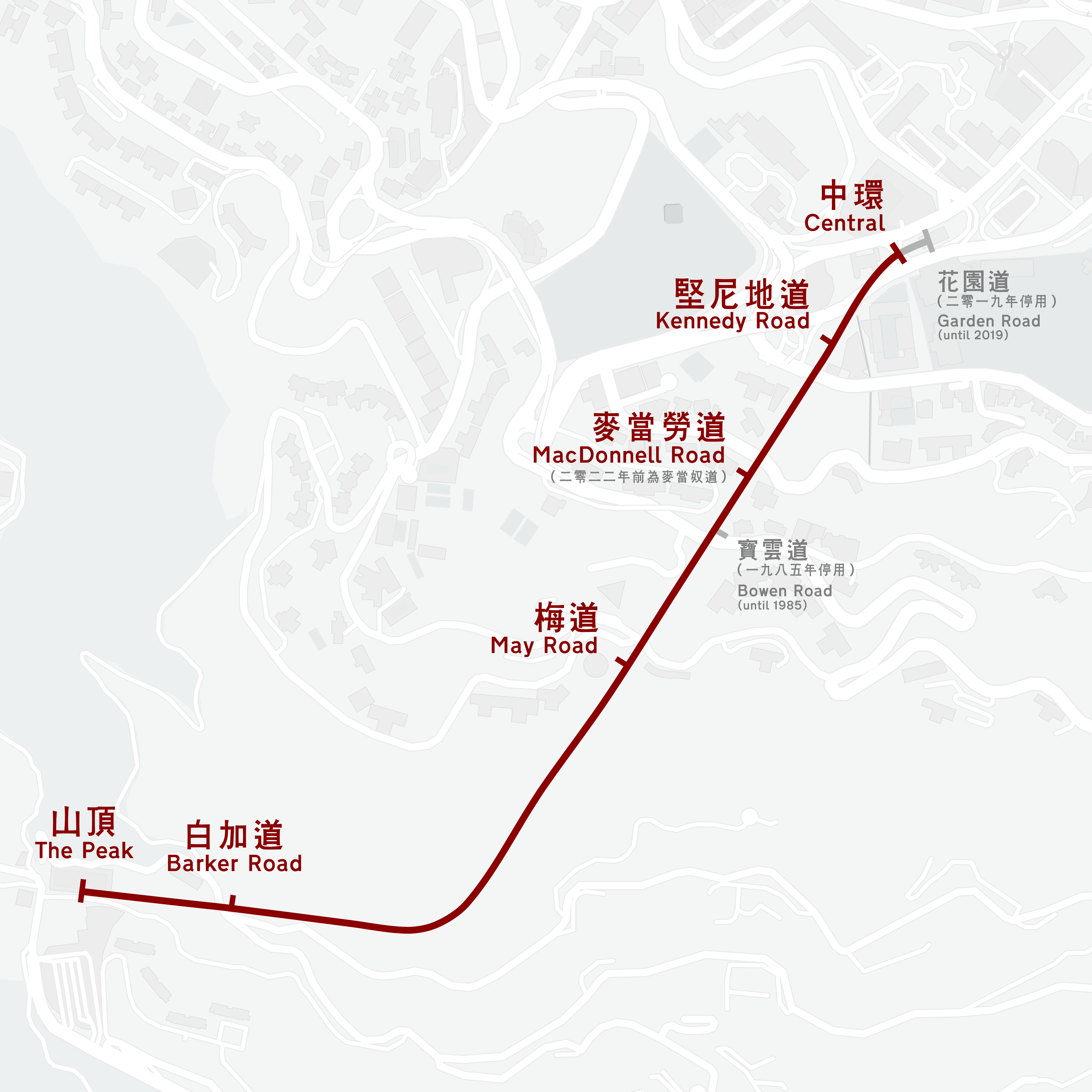
Geographical map of Peak Tram

The Peak Tram's route from Central district to Victoria Peak covers a distance of about 1.4 kilometres (0.87 mi) and an elevation of just under 400 metres (1,312 ft). The line has two pronounced curves, one to the left immediately after leaving the lower terminus, and the other to the right in the upper half of the ascent. The gradient also varies considerably throughout the ascent.

The lower terminus station, Central, is located on Garden Road near St. John's Cathedral. The original station was incorporated into St. John's Building, an office tower, with the tram terminus at the ground level. The station comprises a single track, with platforms on both sides. One platform is used for boarding, the other for exiting the tram.

The upper terminus, The Peak, is located below the Peak Tower shopping and leisure complex at Victoria Gap, some 150 metres (490 ft) below the summit of Victoria Peak. The station has the same arrangement of boarding and alighting platforms as the lower terminus. The haulage and control equipment for the funicular is located in a basement below the station.

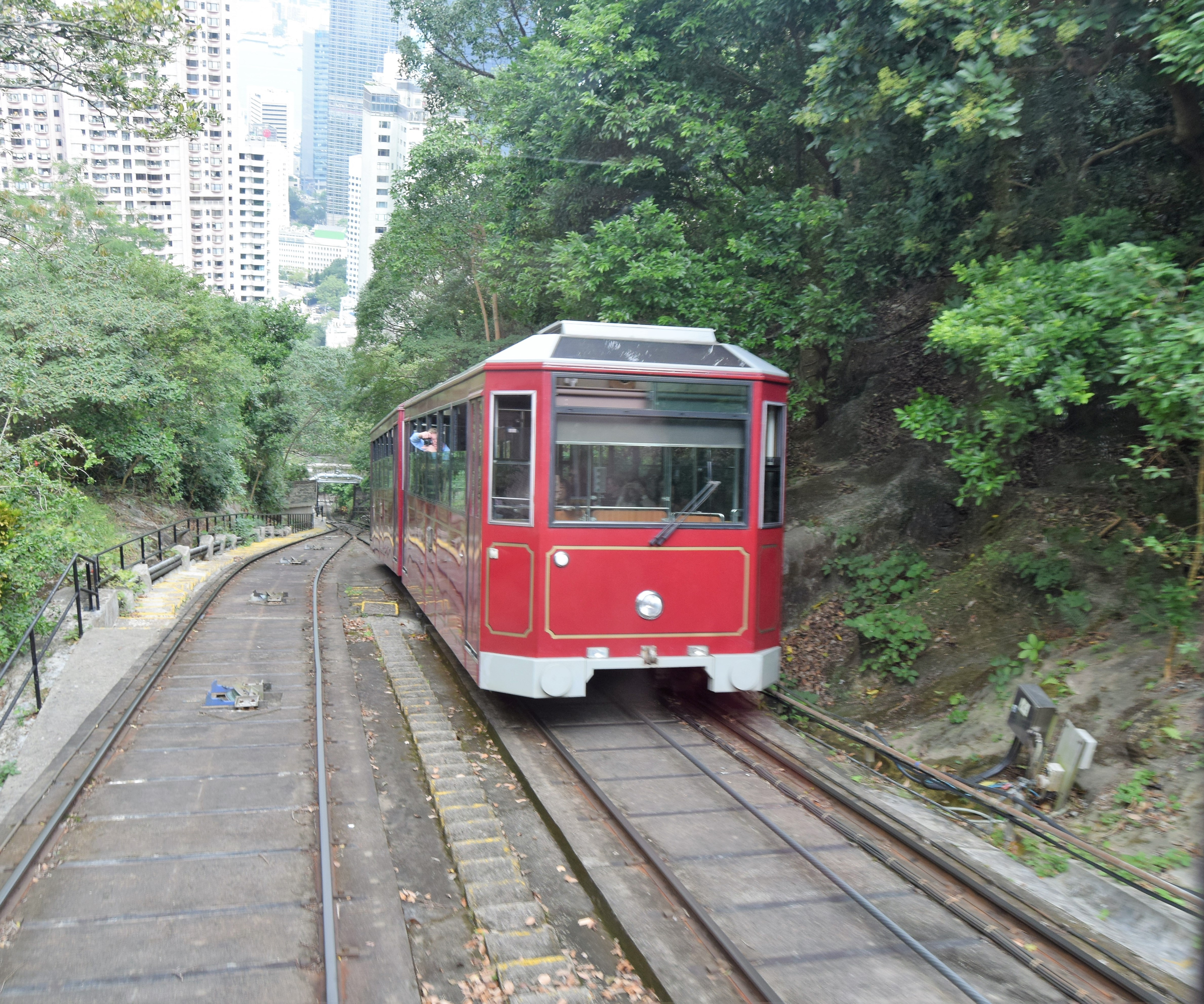
The four rail section of the passing loop. The May Road overbridge can be seen in the background.

The Peak Tram is a funicular tramway - one where the upward and downward trams act as counterweights for each other so two trams are required for its operation.

As it is a single track tramway, a passing loop is needed for the two trams to pass each other - this is located just uphill from the May Road station (and can also be seen from the May Road overbridge). The approximately 400m long section which includes the passing loop changes from two rails to four rails for a short length just before the tramline's upper curve, then there is a length of three rails before it reverts back to two rails.

There are four intermediate stops, each of which is a request stop consisting of a single stepped platform and a shelter:

- Kennedy Road. Located on Kennedy Road, named after Arthur Edward Kennedy, a former Governor of Hong Kong.
- MacDonnell Road. Located on MacDonnell Road, named after Richard Graves MacDonnell, a former Governor of Hong Kong; the depot storing two historic cars is next to the stop.
- May Road. Located on May Road, named after Francis Henry May, a former Governor of Hong Kong.
- Barker Road. Located on Barker Road, named after George Digby Barker, a former military commander and acting administrator of Hong Kong.

== History ==
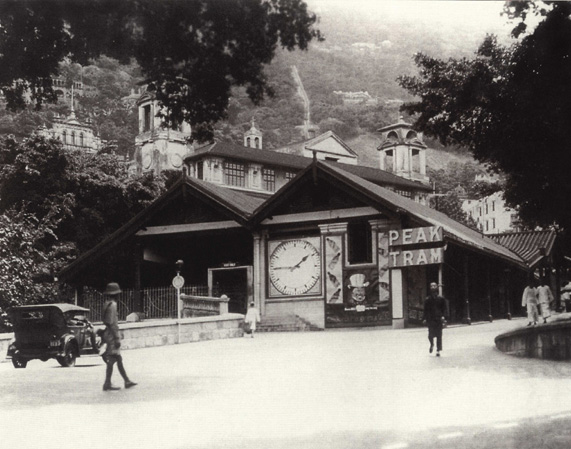
Garden Road Terminus, circa 1920

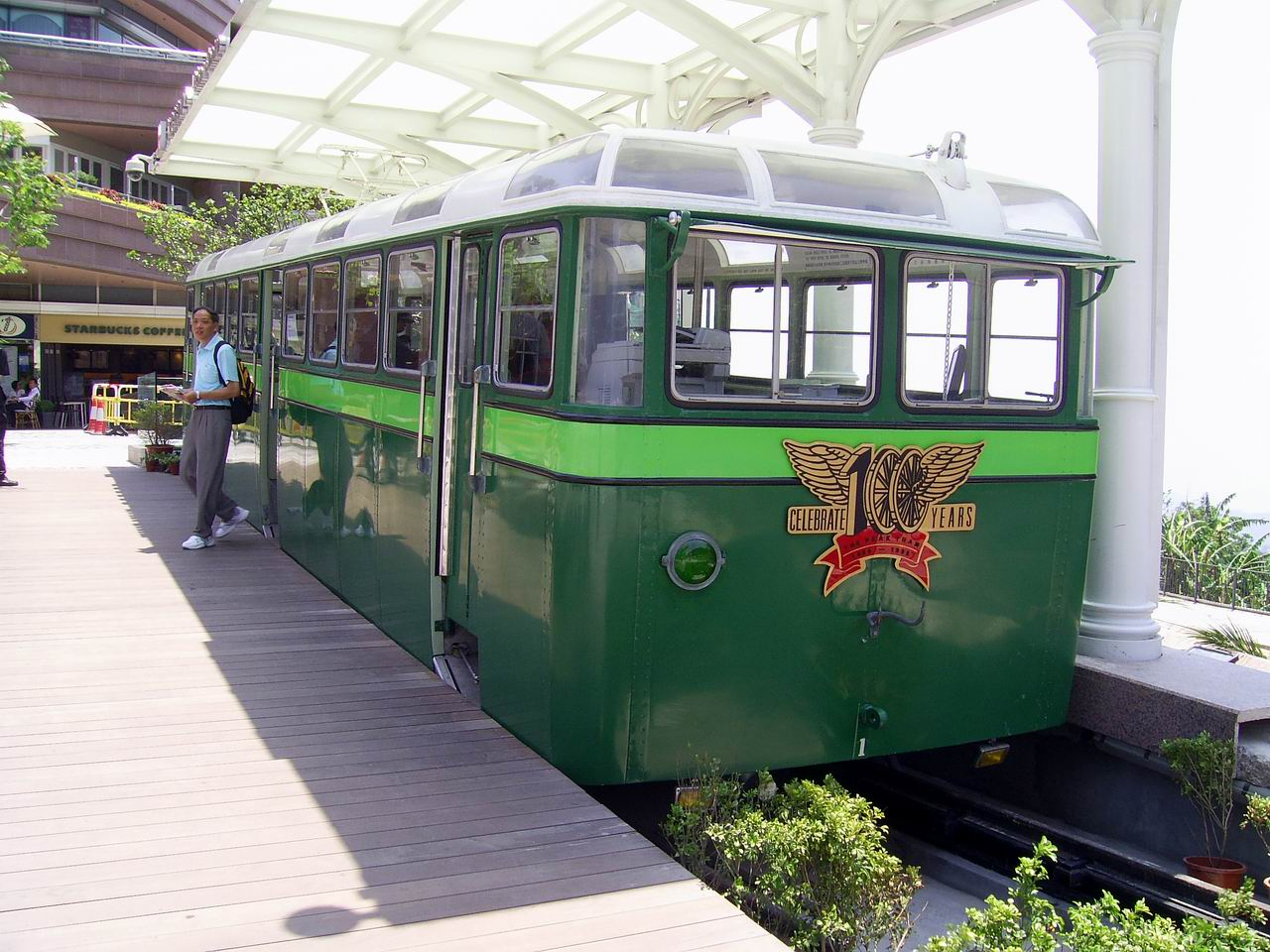
A Peak Tram car from 1956, now displayed near the upper terminus, and still carrying a headboard celebrating the line's centenary in 1988

Peak Tram
- Traditional Chinese: 山頂纜車
- Simplified Chinese: 山顶缆车
Transcriptions
Standard Mandarin
- Hanyu Pinyin: Shāndǐng Lǎnchē
Yue: Cantonese
- Jyutping: saan1 deng2 laam6 ce1

In 1881, Alexander Findlay Smith first put the project of a Peak Railway into shape and presented a petition for a concession to the governor of Hong Kong. The necessary legislation was passed two years later.

Findlay Smith did not approach the project rashly. Travelling extensively in Europe and America, he made himself conversant with nearly every existing method of railway employed for mountain ascent — San Francisco, Scarborough, Rigi, Monterey, Lucerne, the Rhine, Mount Vesuvius — and returned to Hong Kong thoroughly convinced of the feasibility of his idea. The actual construction was begun in September 1885 and in May 1888 the line was officially opened.

Smith's business partner, N. J. Ede, owned and lived in the house next to the Upper Terminus, originally named Dunheved, which they converted into the original Peak Hotel.

It took three years to build the Peak Tram. Most of the heavy equipment and rails needed for the construction were hauled uphill by the workers with no mechanical support. As a revolutionary new form of transport for Asia at the time, the tramway was considered a marvel of engineering upon its completion. A wooden structure was built for the terminal. According to photographs, the Garden Road terminus was originally an unadorned building, a large clock face was added to the edifice probably between the 1910s and 1920s.

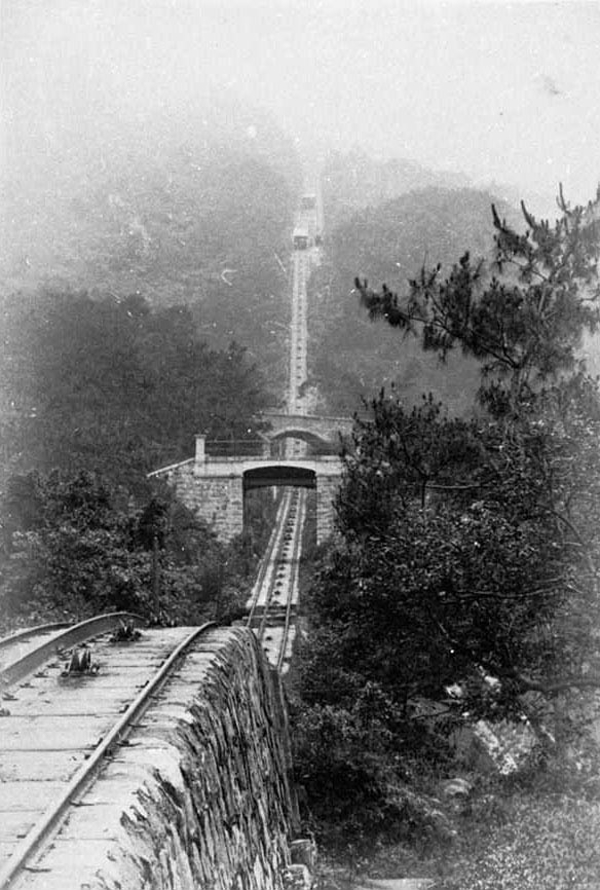
Uphill tram route 1897

The Peak Tram was opened for public service on 28 May 1888 by the then governor Sir George William des Voeux. As built, the line used a static steam engine to power the haulage cable. It was at first used only for residents of Victoria Peak. Despite that, it carried 800 passengers on its first day of operation, and about 150,000 in its first year, transported in the line's original wooden-bodied cars. The tram's existence accelerated the residential development of Victoria Peak and the Mid-Levels.

From its opening in 1888 until 1926, the Peak Tram divided into three classes:

- First Class: British colonial officials and residents of Victoria Peak
- Second Class: British military and Hong Kong Police Force personnel
- Third Class: Other people and animals

The initial upward trip fares were HKD 30 cents (First Class), 20 cents (Second Class) and 10 cents (Third Class) while the downward trip was half these prices. The fares had risen 50 per cent by 1926 - they are now HKD108 return and HKD76 single after a significant rise in December 2024.

From 1908 to 1949, the first two seats in the front of the tram were reserved for the governor of Hong Kong, to which was attached a bronze plaque reading: "This seat is reserved for His Excellency the Governor". The seats were not available to ordinary passengers until two minutes before departure.

In the course of its history, the tram has been a victim of two natural disasters, caused by floods from heavy rainfall, which washed away steep sections of the track between Bowen Road and Kennedy Road. The first was in 1899, and the second occurred on 12 June 1966.

In 1926, the steam engine was replaced by an electric motor. On 11 December 1941, during the Battle of Hong Kong, the engine room was damaged in an attack. Services were not resumed until 25 December 1945, after the end of the Japanese occupation of Hong Kong.

In 1956, the Peak Tram was equipped with a new generation of lightweight metal-bodied cars, each of which seated 62 passengers. Unusually for a funicular line, three such cars were provided, only two of which were in use at any one time. The third spare car was kept in a car shed near the Kennedy Road station.

The system was comprehensively rebuilt in 1989 by the Swiss company, Von Roll, with a new track, a computerized control system, and two new two-car trams with a capacity of 120 passengers per tram. By the time of the handover in 1997, the system carried some 2 million passengers annually. Today, more than 4 million people ride the Peak Tram annually, or an average of over 11,000 every day.

Of prior rolling stock, only two 1956 fourth generation all-aluminium cars and one 1989 fifth generation car survive. Two cars, one from both previous generations, can be seen on a disused spur track that led to the former tram depot near the Kennedy Road station. An additional fourth generation car is displayed near the upper terminal, now serving as a Tourism Board Information Center. None of the cars from the first three generations exist, but a replica of the first car is displayed in the Peak Tram Historical Gallery.

=== The Peak Tram Upgrade Project ===
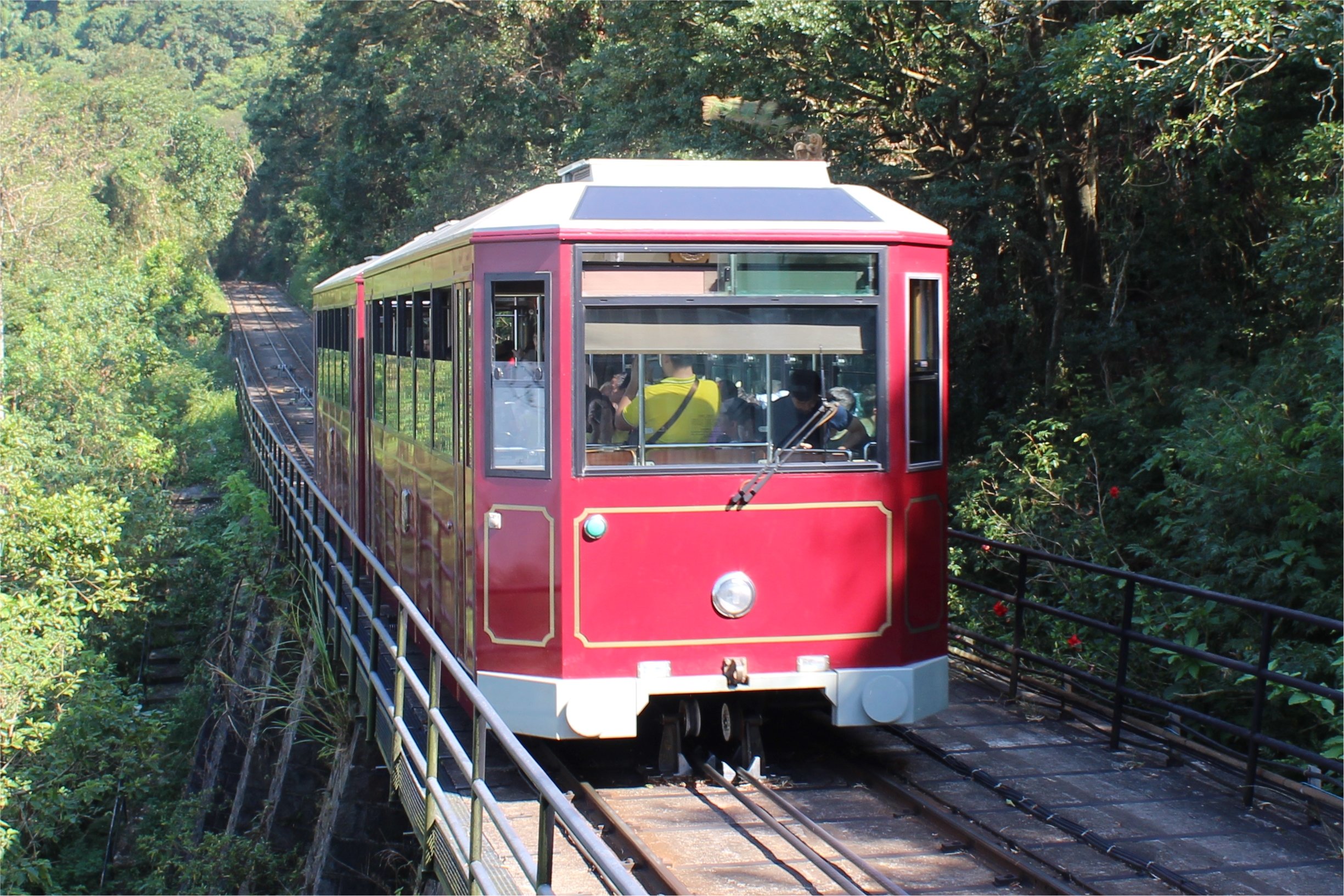
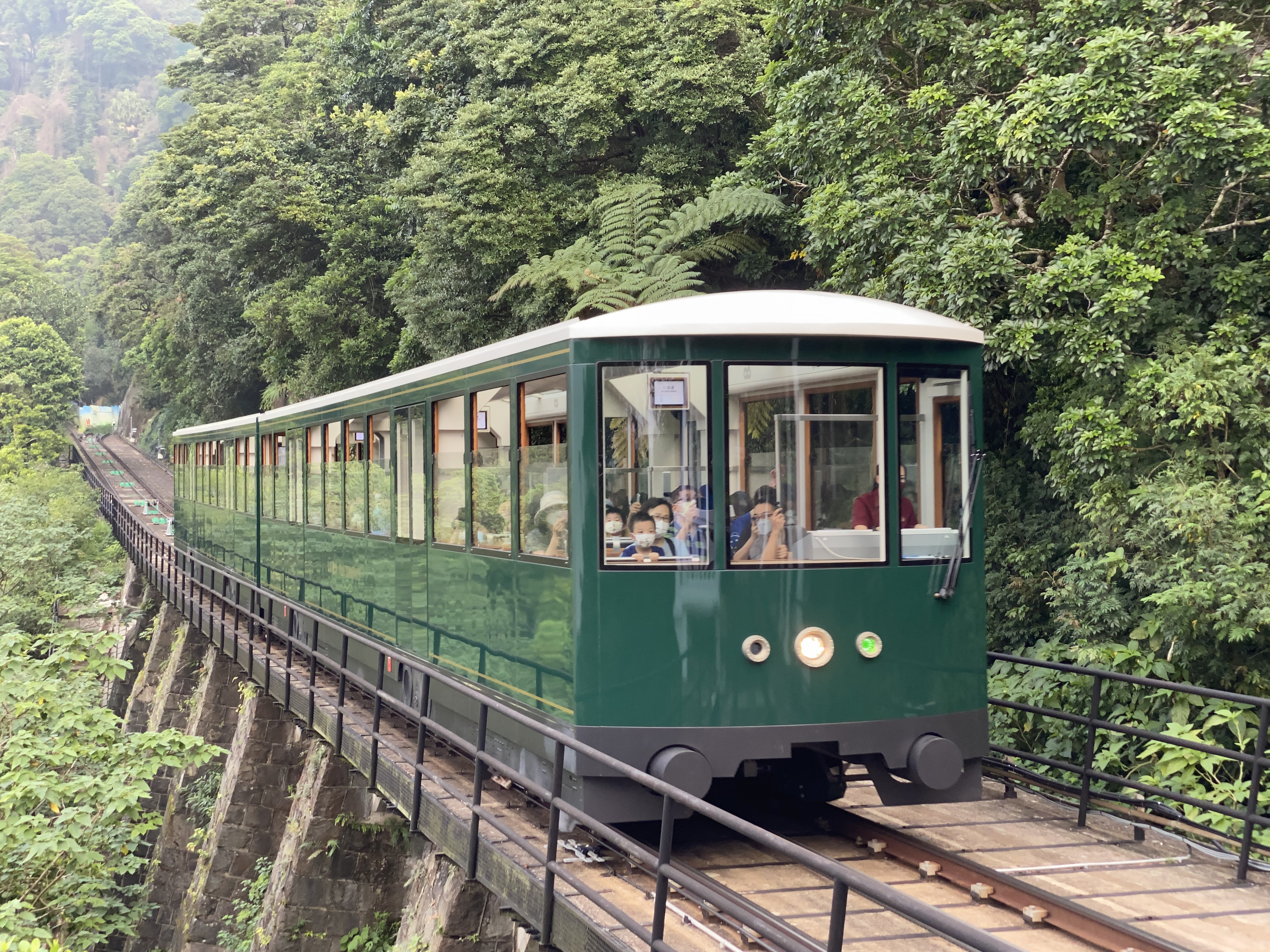
Fifth generation (above) and sixth generation (below) trams

In view of the continuous increase in the number of tourists visiting Hong Kong, passenger usage of the tram was increasing by more than one digit percentage every year, especially on Sundays and public holidays. It was taking at least two hours to board; passenger demand far exceeded capacity. By 2012, average daily passenger usage reached 12,000, of which around 90% were tourists. At that period, Peak Tramways Company Limited hired a consultant to study how to improve the Peak Tram terminal and facilities to increase the available space, also considering re-laying tracks and to renovate the cable car cabins to increase the passenger capacity.

At the end of 2015, Peak Tramways Company Limited's right to operate the Peak Tram expired. In the same year, it stated that it planned to spend about HK$684 million to launch a development plan to upgrade the Peak Tram system and improve existing facilities. It was implemented in phases and to be completed in 4 to 5 years. The development plan included:

- Purchasing new trams to increase the passenger capacity of the Peak Tram from 120 to 210 passengers per trip, which will greatly reduce the waiting time for passengers by approximately 75–91%
- Extend the Garden Road tram station and build the platform about 70 metres (230 ft) uphill, after arriving at the "Red Brick House" in the WWF Central Visitor Center, providing a covered, temperature-controlled and comfortable waiting area for queuing, as well as providing a moderate amount of entertainment (such as historical exhibits on the Peak Tram) for approximately 1,300 waiting passengers
- Refurbishment of the upper platform of the Peak Tram Station, including widening the boarding platform; increasing the number of gates and ticket counters, and setting up a larger waiting area in front of the ticket office
- More effective crowd monitoring to ensure the safety of tourists, employees and pedestrians
- Further enhancement of the image of the Peak Tram and maintaining the status of the tram as an important tourism and leisure facility

The project was expected to be completed in 2021, during which the construction was divided into two phases. The first phase, which lasted from April 23, 2019, saw the Peak Tram being suspended for 2 to 3 months. The maintenance plan included the extension of the Peak Terminus and Garden Road Terminus, which was completed on July 22 of the same year. After the completion of the first phase of the project, the Peak Tram service was resumed for about 12 to 15 months. During this period, due to the expansion and renovation of the Garden Road Terminus, passengers used the temporary platform and queue outside the station.

The second phase began on June 28, 2021, with the closure of the line. New tram carriages were installed, with longer bodies, and passenger capacity increased from 120 to 210. At the same time, power and towing systems, rail, control and signal systems and cables were replaced, and the renovation of the Peak Terminus and the Garden Road Terminus were complete, with the expansion of the former to cater for the new and larger tram carriage.

The project improved the waiting environment, replaced tracks, improved foundations, cable car bridges and other structures. The government stated that the entire development plan invested more than 700 million Hong Kong dollars. Final project costs were $799m HKD (£87m). After a closure of 14 months, the tram was reopened on 27 August 2022, though tourist numbers in Hong Kong are a fraction of their pre-COVID levels.

The upgrade's opening ceremony was held on 2 December 2022. It commenced with the lighting-up of the Eye of Infinity, a 10-metre-tall sculpture at the Central Terminus by Australian artist Lindy Lee, a commission that was part of the overall project.

=== Heritage buildings ===
==== Barker Road Tram Station ====
Built in 1919, Barker Road Station is the oldest surviving Peak Tram station. The station building is a striking open structure featuring semi-circular arches topping its columns, and has classical and Art Deco influences. The arches on the street side have ornamental ironwork with a radiating pattern (the current ironwork being installed in 2008). There is a cantilevered canopy on the Barker Road side which is believed to have originally been a coolie shelter for sedan chair and rickshaw bearers. The building, annex and walkway extension have changed little with the passage of time. It is a Grade I historic building.

==== The Peak Depot ====
The Peak Depot (山頂倉庫) is a rendered brick two-storey rectangular building close to The Peak Terminus with a place in Hong Kong's transportation and water supply history. It was built c.1903.as a 'chair coolie house' - a shelter and quarters for sedan chair 'coolies' whose customers were going to and from the terminus. From around 1910 it was used as a waterworks office, workshop and depot, having accommodation for waterworks workers upstairs up to WW2, but is now vacant. It's siting and views make it a potential adaptive reuse site. It is a Grade II historic building.

==== No. 1 Lugard Road ====
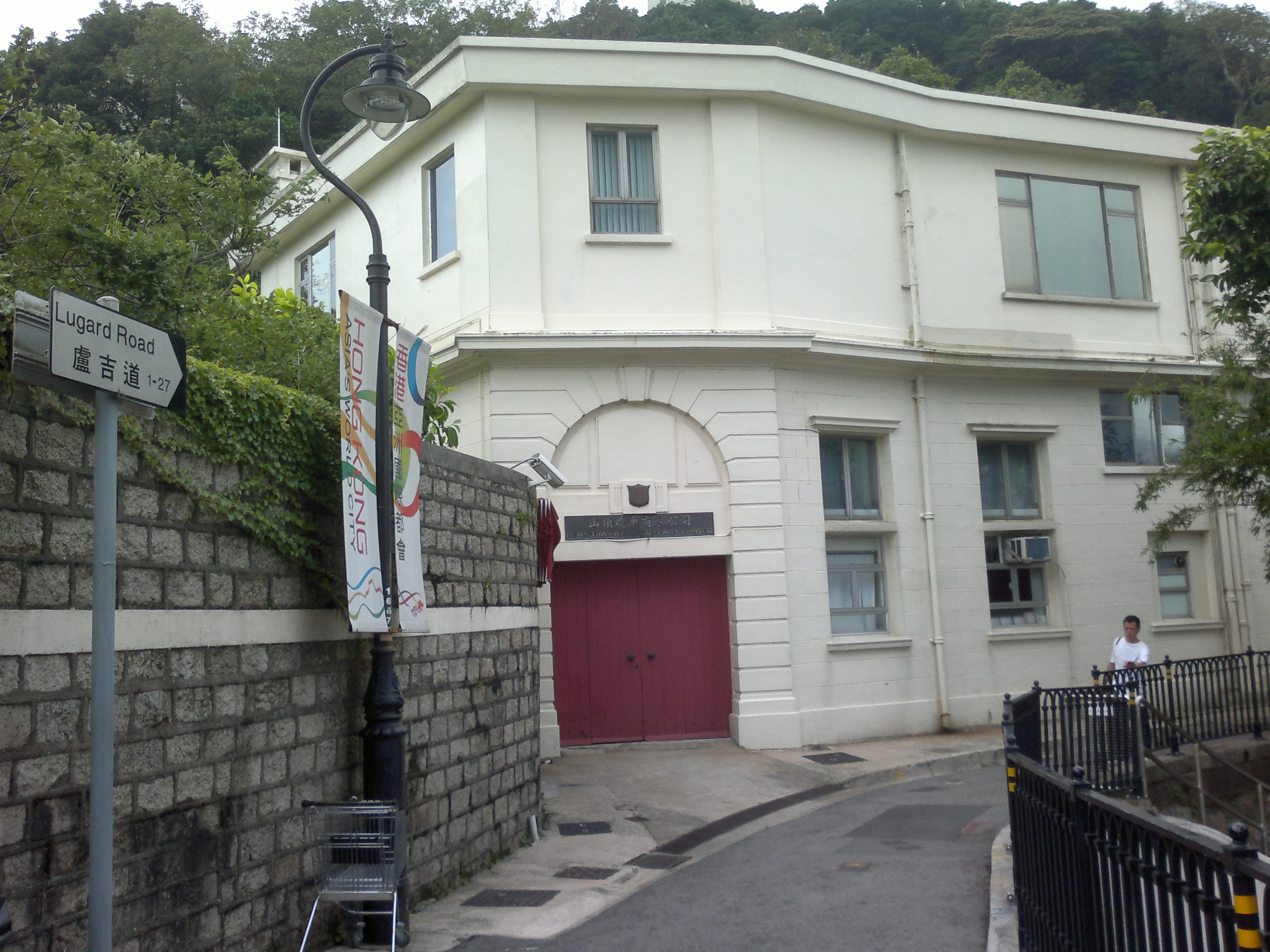
Start of Lugard Road, next to the Peak Tower and The Peak Lookout: the white building is No. 1 Lugard Road.

The building at No. 1 Lugard Road, located next to the Peak Tower and The Peak Lookout, was built about 1927 by The Peak Tramways Co. Ltd. as a workshop, with an additional floor added in 1953 to provide a flat for the General Manager of Company. The building is still owned and used by the Peak Tramways Company. It has been a Grade III historic building since 2010.

== Statistics ==
The Peak Tram is a funicular railway, with the following technical parameters:

- Length: 1,364 metres (4,475 ft)
- Elevation: 27 metres (89 ft)–396 metres (1,299 ft)
- Maximum steepness: 48%
- Track gradient: 4–27 degrees
- Cars: 2 two-car train sets
- Car builder: CWA, Switzerland
- Capacity: 210 passengers per train set
- Configuration: Single track with passing loop
- Journey time: Average five minutes
- Maximum speed: 6 metres per second (19.69 ft/s; 13.42 mph)
- Track gauge: 1,520 mm (4 ft 11 27/32 in) Russian gauge
- Traction: Electric

== See also ==
- List of buildings and structures in Hong Kong
- List of funicular railways
- Peak District Reservation Ordinance 1904
- Tourism in Hong Kong
- Transport in Hong Kong
