= Kennedy Road stop =

Coordinates: 22.276501°N 114.158112°E

Kennedy Road 堅尼地道
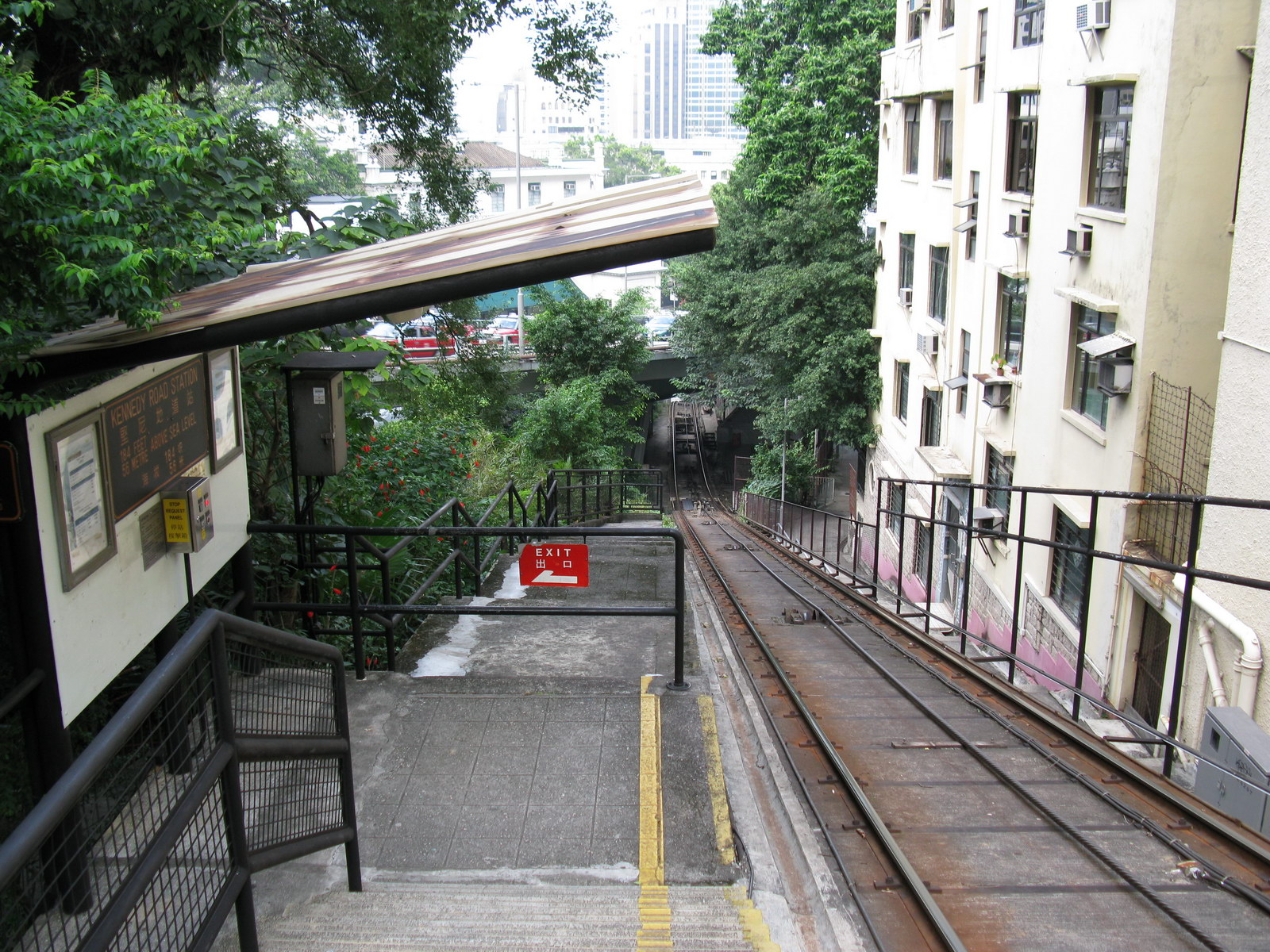
- Looking downhill Kennedy Road station in 2007

General information
- Location: Kennedy Road, Central; Central and Western District; Hong Kong
- Elevation: 56 metres (184 ft)
- Line: Peak Tram
- Platforms: 1 side platform
- Tracks: 1

History
- Opened: 30 May 1888; 138 years ago

Services
Preceding stop	The Peninsula Hotels	Following stop
Central Terminus Terminus	Peak Tram	MacDonnell Road towards The Peak Terminus
Location

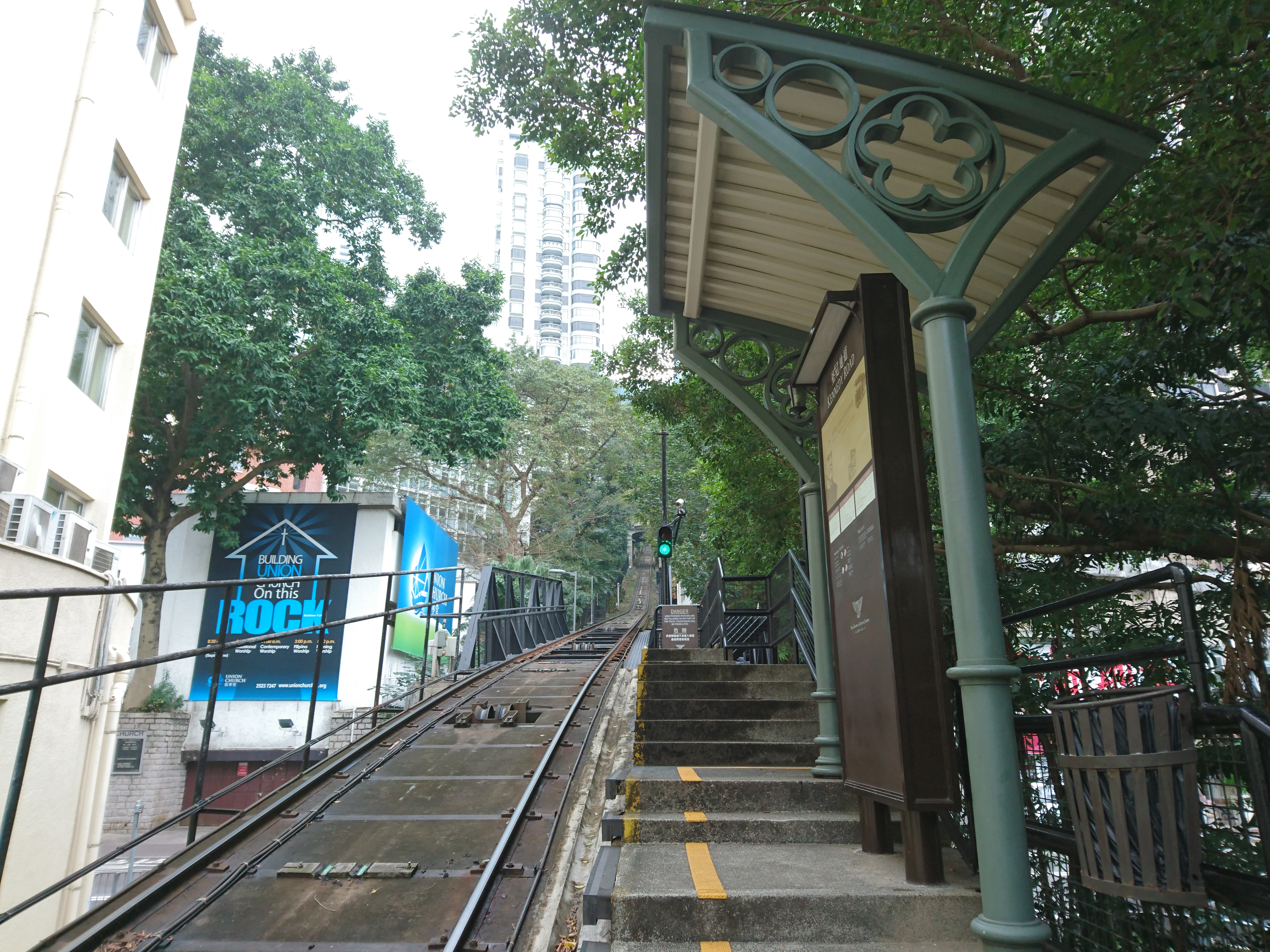
Looking uphill Kennedy Road station in 2017

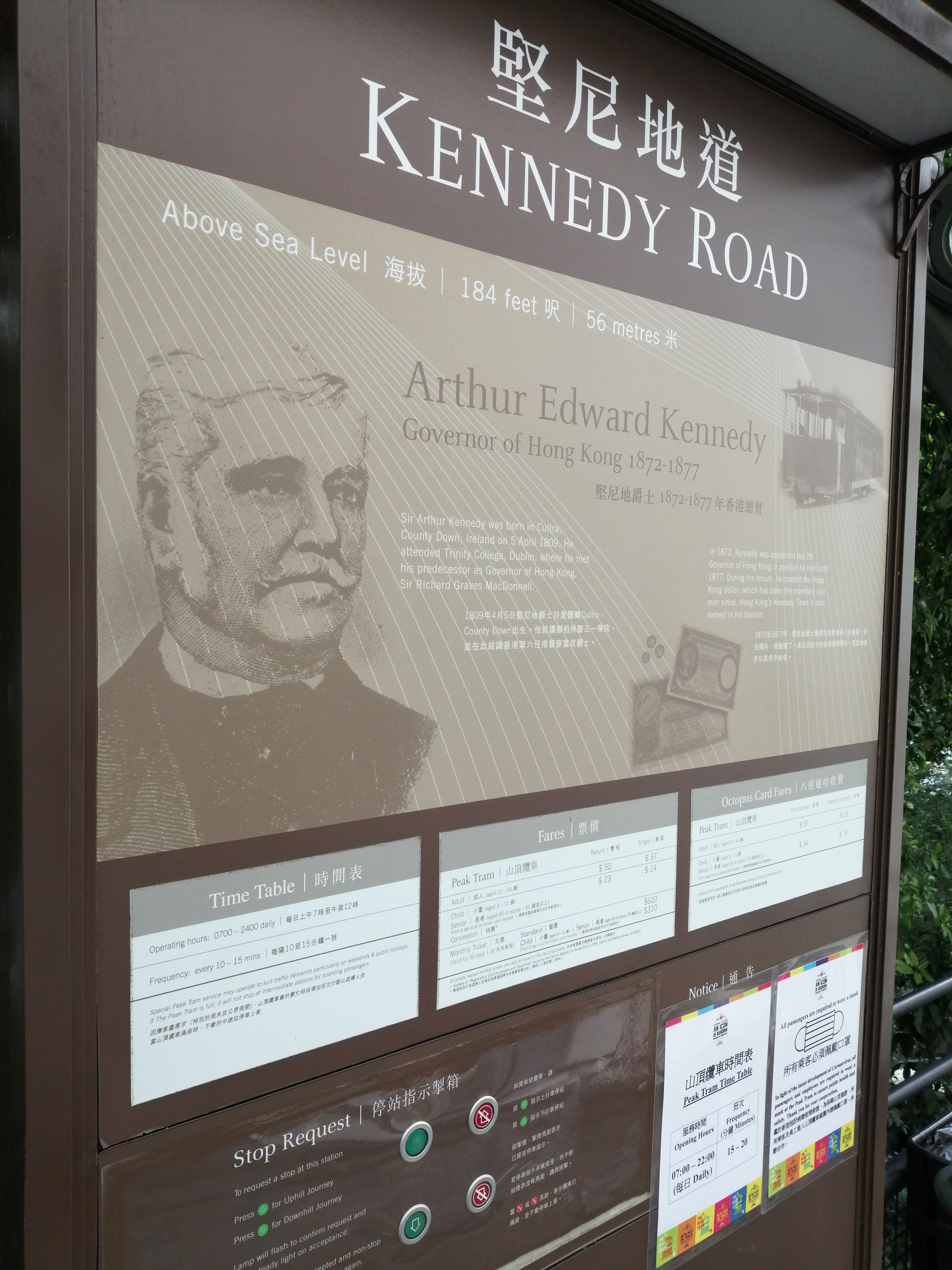
Station signage for Kennedy Road

Kennedy Road is an intermediate station on the Peak Tram. It is located on Kennedy Road, in Central, Hong Kong, 56 metres above sea level.

The station comprises a single platform on the western side of the single track. The platform is longer than the trams currently used on the line, with a disused section of platform at the downhill end blocked to public access. Kennedy Road passes underneath the tramway at the south end of the station, the tramway crossing the road on a steel truss bridge.

The station is a request stop at which tram cars will stop only if passengers have pressed the request button inside the tramcar or at the station. No ticketing equipment is provided on the platform. Passengers can pay with Octopus when boarding the tram.

== History ==
The nearby Union Church funded half the costs of building the Kennedy Road stop.
