= Barker Road =

Road on Victoria Peak, Hong Kong

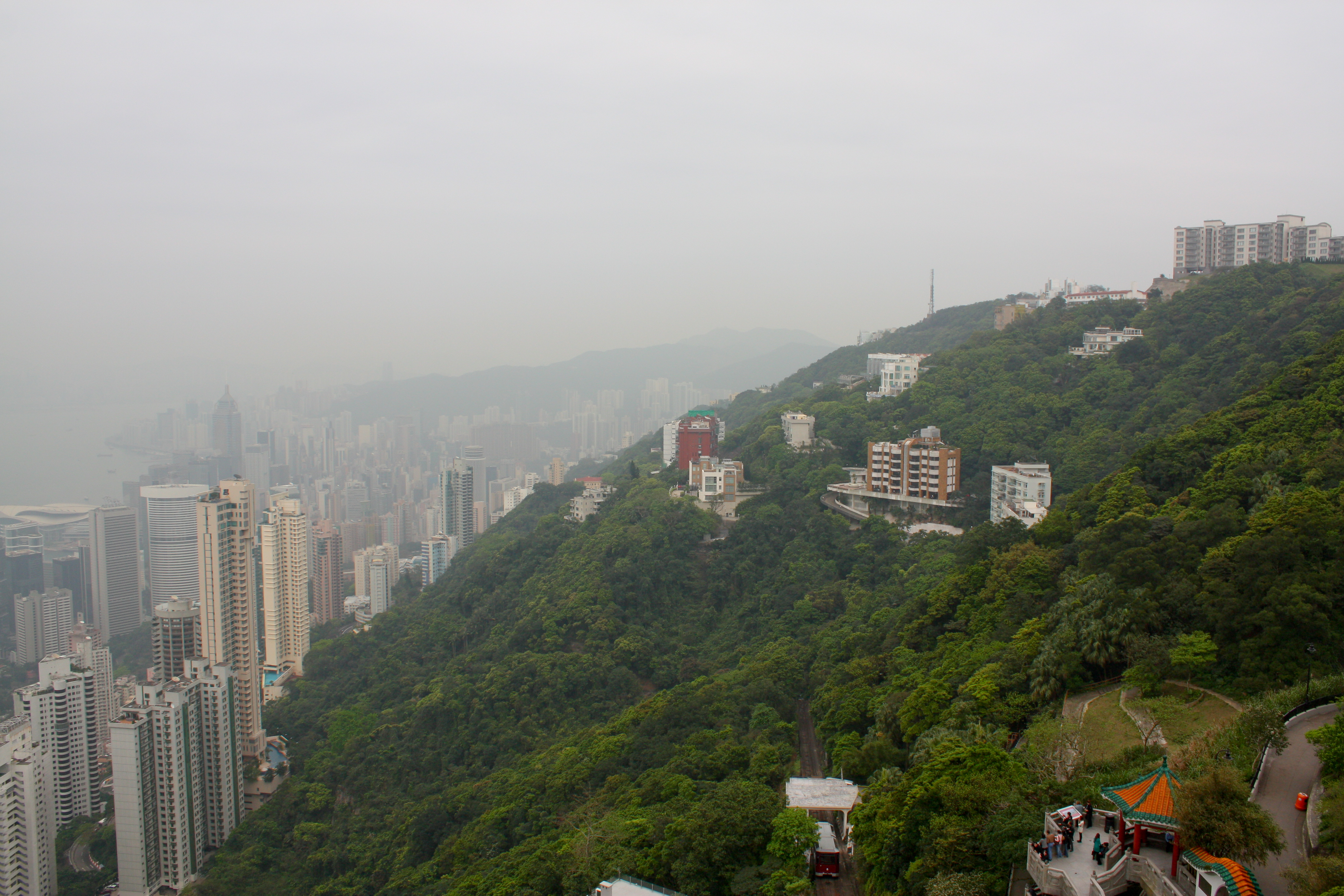
- Western section of Barker Road, seen from the Peak Tower
- Interactive map of Barker Road
- Length: 1,730 metres (5,660 ft)
- Location: Victoria Peak, Hong Kong

Construction
- Completed: 1898; 128 years ago

Barker Road (Chinese: 白加道) is a road located on Victoria Peak, Hong Kong at an altitude of approximately 350 metres (1150 ft) above sea level with a length of about 1,7 km (1,1 mi). It starts from the Old Peak Road (below the Peak Tram Upper Terminus) and ends at Magazine Gap on Peak Road.

Barker Road has apartments as government staff quarters for middle-ranked civil servants.

== Name ==
The road was named after George Digby Barker, a former military commander and acting administrator of Hong Kong between May and December 1891.

== History ==
The road opened in 1898. The Public Works Department reported in its Annual Report for 1898

The Barker Road leading from Plantation Road to Magazine Gap was also completed in the year and opened for traffic, the total cost being $26,880.00. The length of this road is 5,660 feet and the ruling gradient 2 in 40, while the steepest gradients being 1 in 20 make it available for rickshaw traffic. […]

Long before completion, the road became a favourite evening walk and already three large building sites have been sold, and the erection of one European residence is well advanced.

From this report it can be seen that Barker Road originally started at Plantation Road close to the Barker Road station (then Plantation Road station). Later the part from the station to the (Old) Peak Road was renamed from Plantation to Barker Road.

== Peak tram stop ==
On the western end of Barker Road is the Barker Road stop of the Peak Tram. The tram runs over Barker Road on a bridge creating a narrow tunnel.

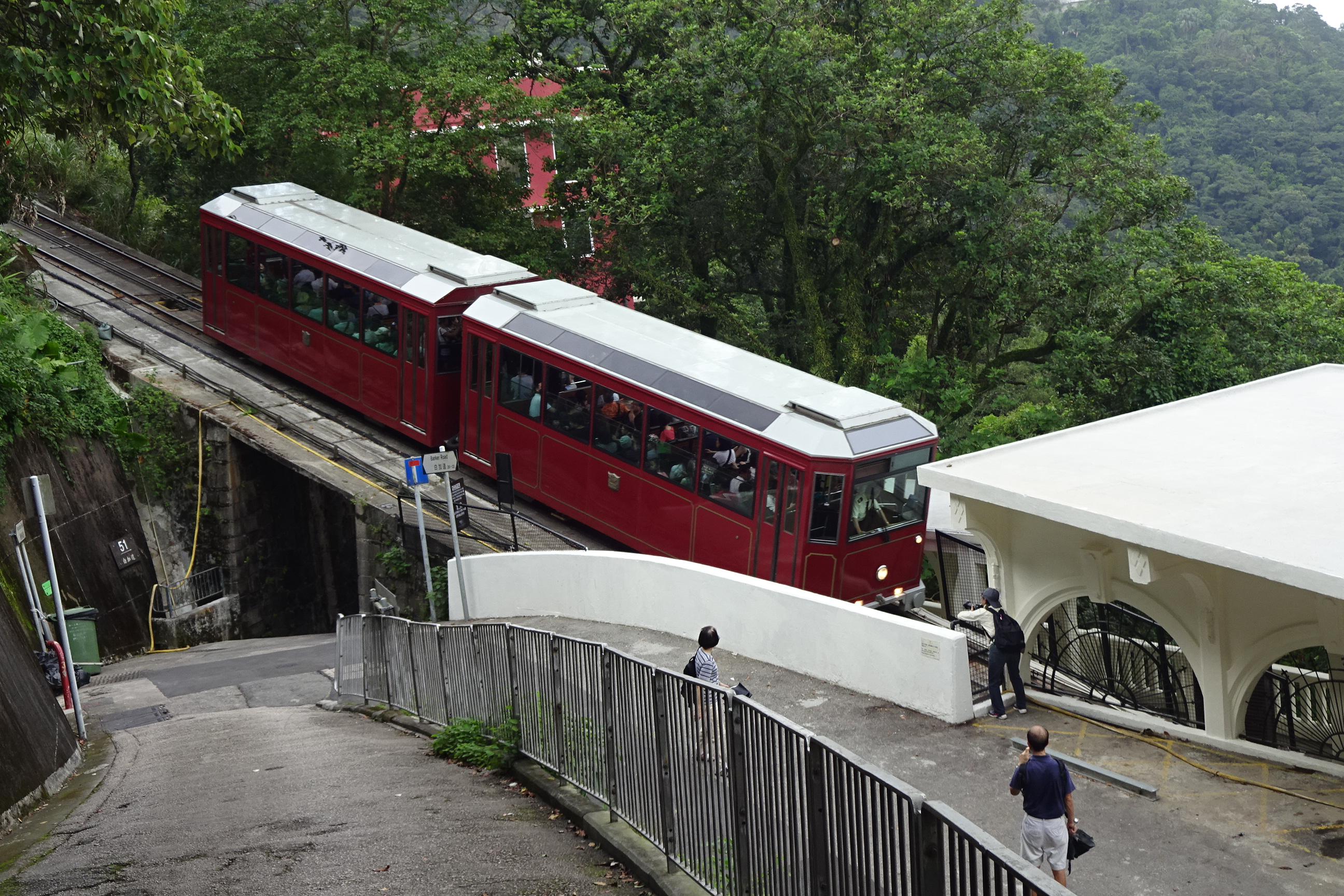
Downhill tram near the Barker Road stop (taken from Plantation Road). Barker Road runs downhill under the bridge making a right turn.

== Houses ==
Barker Road is located on the steep slopes of Mount Gough. From all lots residents have an undisturbed view onto Victoria Harbour making it a very expensive location. For that reason and due to the difficult terrain not too many houses have been built there. Most houses have been renewed since the first one was built on one lot, so today’s houses mainly are second or third generation.

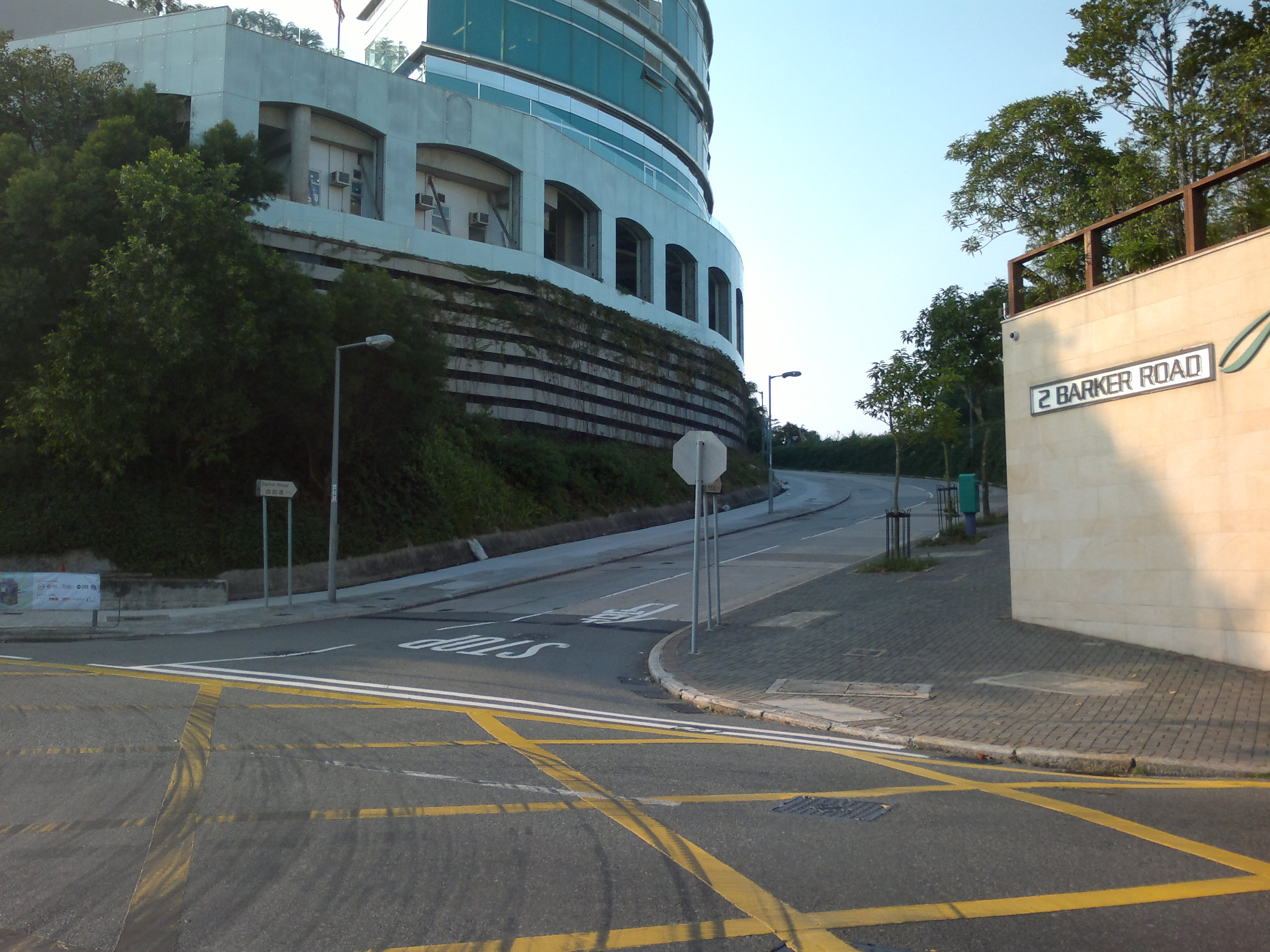
Eastern end of Barker Road near Peak Road

The following houses are there today (1/2019):

Barker Road No.	Name of the house	Date of occupation	Generation No.
1	Barker Road Podium	approx. 2005	2
2	Sky Court	1992	3
3	Residence of the US Consul General	1987	2
8	Trollstua	1945	1
11	Commanders Residence (Headquarters House)	?	2
12	Bracken Hill	1953	2
15	Victoria House	1951	2
17	Victoria Flats	1923	1
22	-	2017 demolished	2
23	Cragside Mansion	1975	2
27	Altadena House	1974	2
28	Knightsbridge Court	2013	3
31	Richmond Houses	2003	3
35	Falconridge	2018	3
37	-	1985	1
41	Barker Villa	1974	1
43	Haking Mansions	2001	2
47	Villa Blanca	2016 demolished	2
	Barker Road stop	1888/1919	1
51	Epworth Lodge	1949	2

Odd numbers are uphill of Barker Road, even numbers downhill.

== Victoria Hospital ==
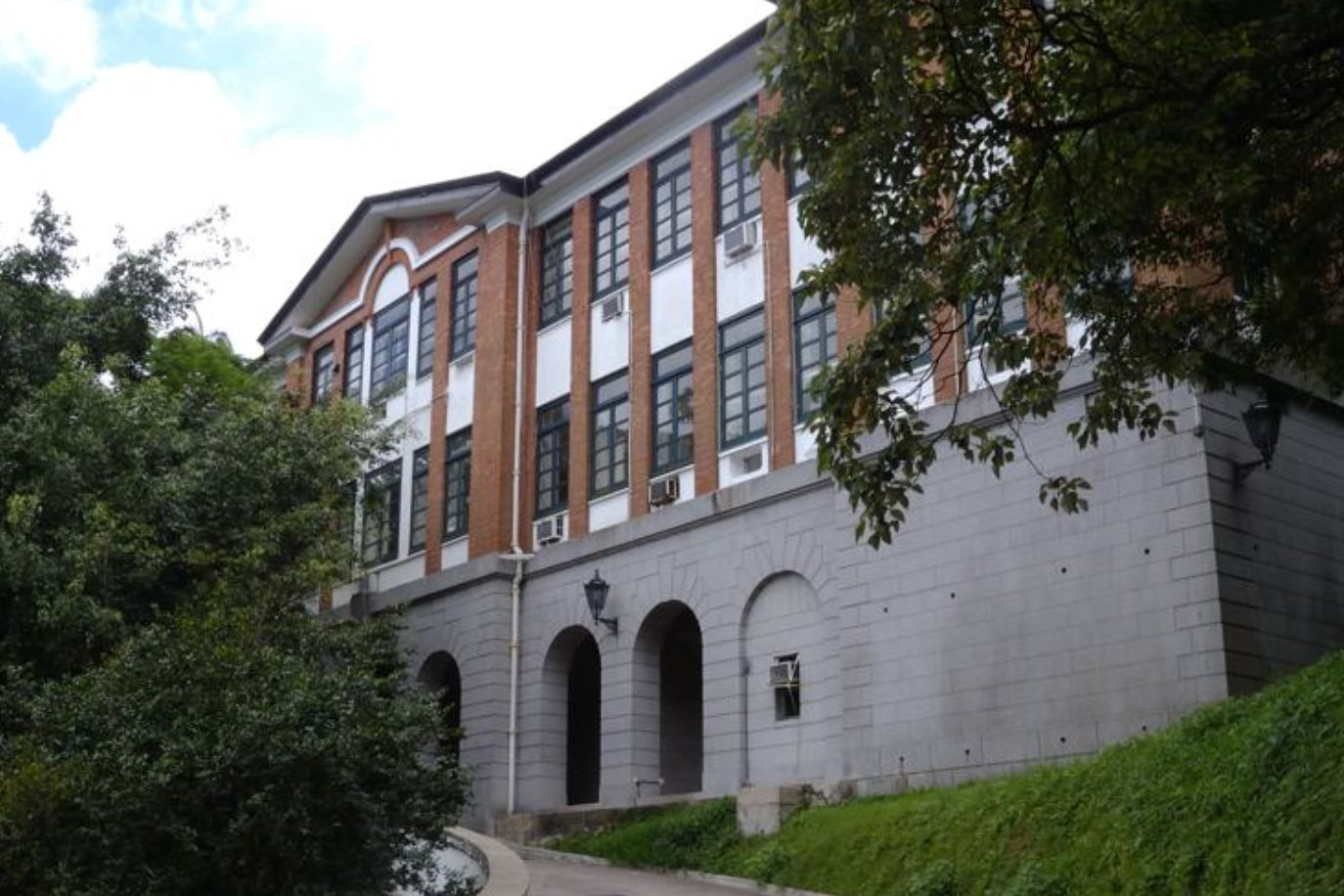
Victoria flats, former Maternity Ward of the Victoria Hospital

The most prominent building on Barker Road was Victoria Hospital. It was located at 15-17, Barker Road. It opened in 1903. In 1923, a maternity ward was added, this is today’s Victoria Flats – the only about 100 years old building on Barker Road. During World War II, the hospital was damaged and looted afterwards. In 1947, the hospital was demolished as it was beyond repair. On this place, Victoria House was built in 1951.
