= Peak Tower =

Shopping complex and funicular station in Hong Kong

Coordinates: 22°16′17.49″N 114°8′59.45″E

The Peak Tower
- 凌霄閣
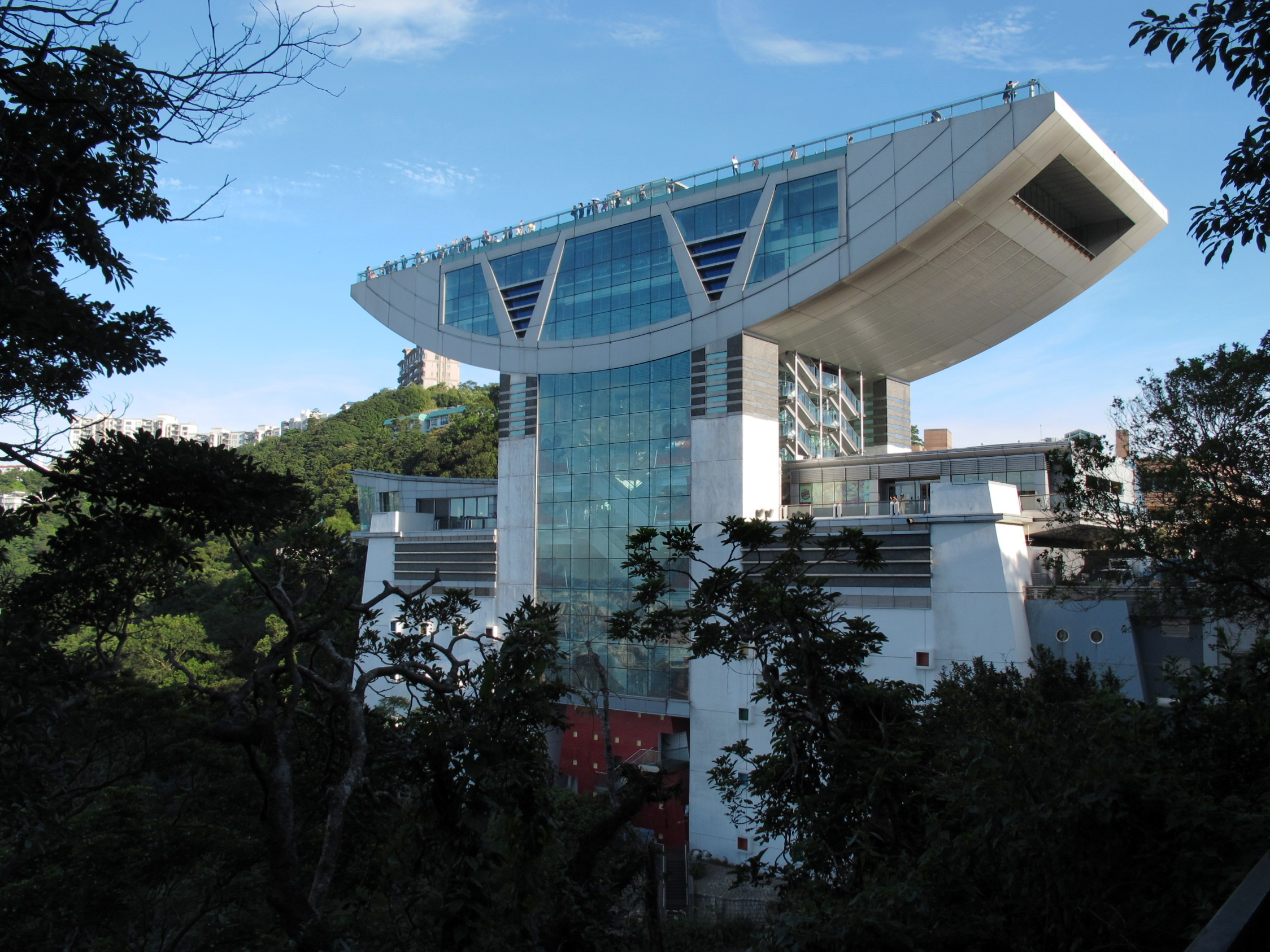
- Peak Tower viewed from Lugard Road
- Interactive map of the The Peak Tower area

General information
- Status: Completed
- Type: Shopping complex, funicular station
- Architectural style: Postmodern
- Location: 128 Peak Road, Victoria Gap, Hong Kong Island, Hong Kong
- Elevation: 396 metres (1,299 ft)
- Construction started: 1993; 33 years ago
- Opened: May 1997; 28 years ago
- Renovated: 2006; 20 years ago
- Cost: HK$500,000,000
- Renovation cost: HK$100,000,000

Technical details
- Floor count: 8
- Floor area: 10,400 square metres (112,000 sq ft)

Design and construction
- Architect: TFP Farrells
- Developer: Hongkong and Shanghai Hotels
- Engineer: Arup
- Main contractor: Chun Wo

Renovating team
- Architect: Ronald Lu and Partners
- Engineer: Arup
- Main contractor: Hip Hing Construction

Website
- www.thepeak.com.hk/en/

Peak Tower
- Traditional Chinese: 凌霄閣
- Simplified Chinese: 凌霄阁
- Cantonese Yale: Lihng sīu gok
Transcriptions
Standard Mandarin
- Hanyu Pinyin: Língxiāogé
Yue: Cantonese
- Yale Romanization: Lihng sīu gok
- Jyutping: Ling4 siu1 gok3

The Peak Tower is a shopping complex located at Victoria Gap, near the summit of Victoria Peak on Hong Kong Island, Hong Kong. It also houses the upper terminal of the Peak Tram, a funicular railway. Both the Peak Tower and the Peak Tram are owned by the Hongkong and Shanghai Hotels group, the owner of Hong Kong's Peninsula Hotel and other properties. The tower and tram are jointly promoted by the collective branding known as The Peak.

The Peak Tower is located at an elevation of 396 m (1,299 ft), 156 m (512 ft) below the summit of Victoria Peak. Because the architects sought a design which would be prominent on the skyline but would not interrupt the natural line of the hills, they chose a site in a dip along the line of the hills, and restricted the tower's height to 428 m above sea level.

== History ==
The Peak Tram opened in 1888. A wooden structure was built as its first upper terminus station.

The current Peak Tower is the second on the site.

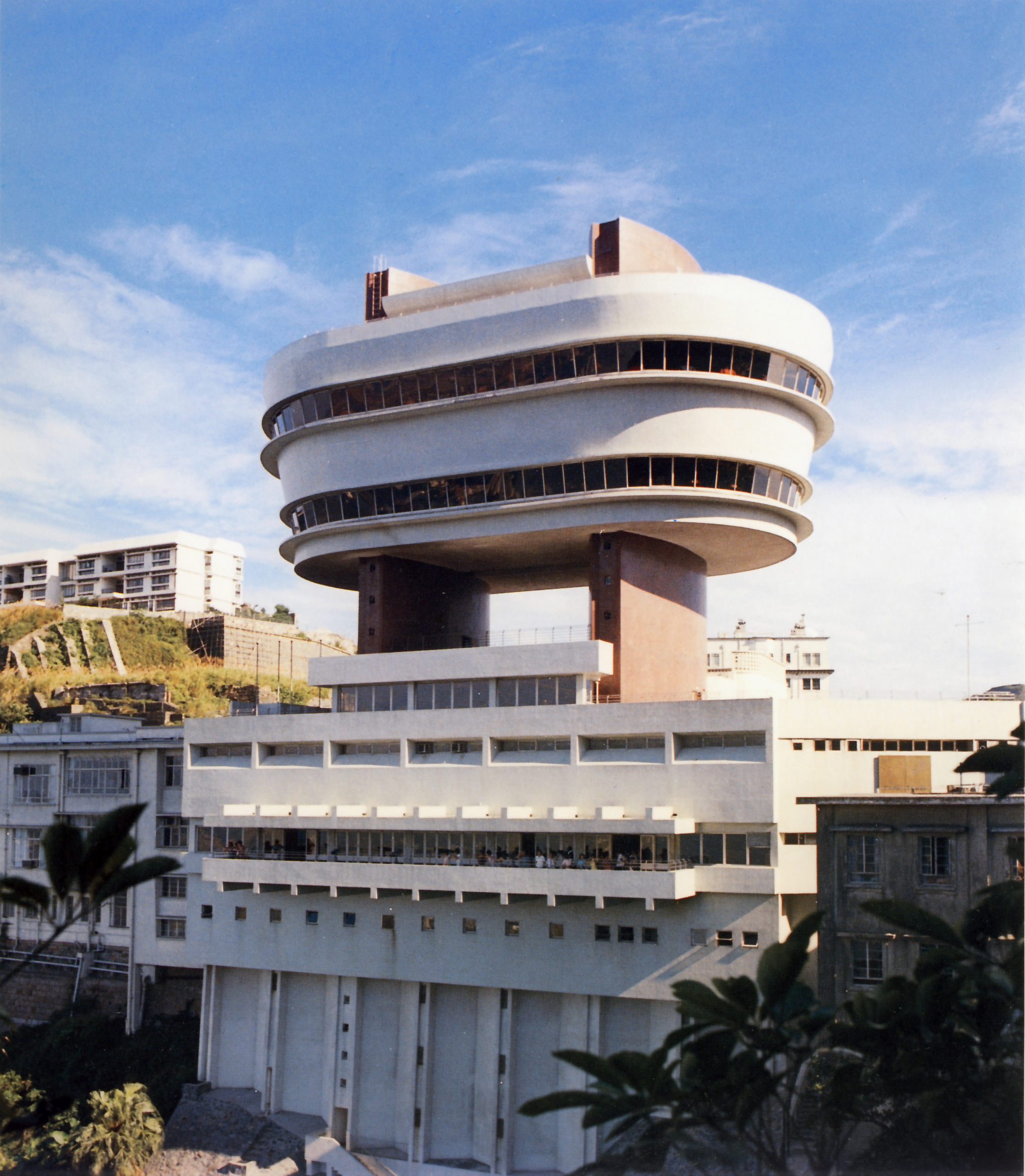
Original design in the 1970s

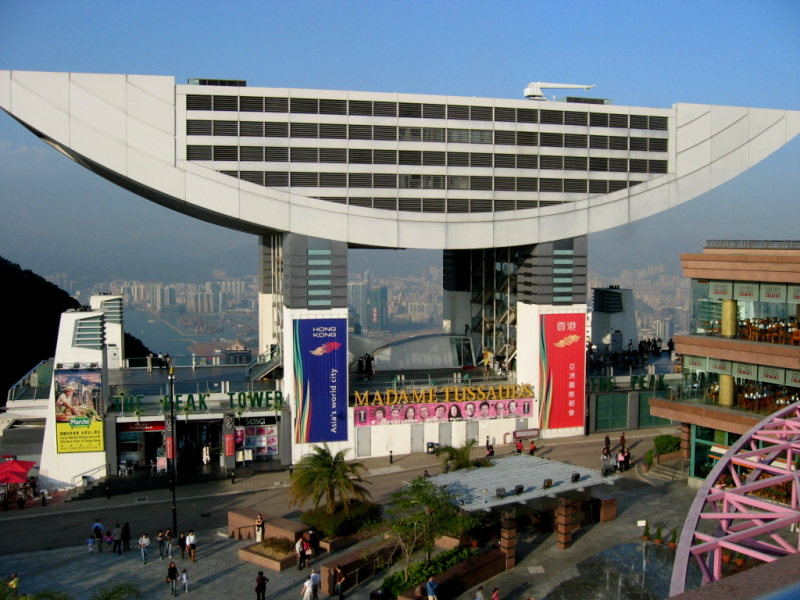
South face of the building prior to the 2006 alteration, showing the open space beneath the "bowl" which was later glassed in.

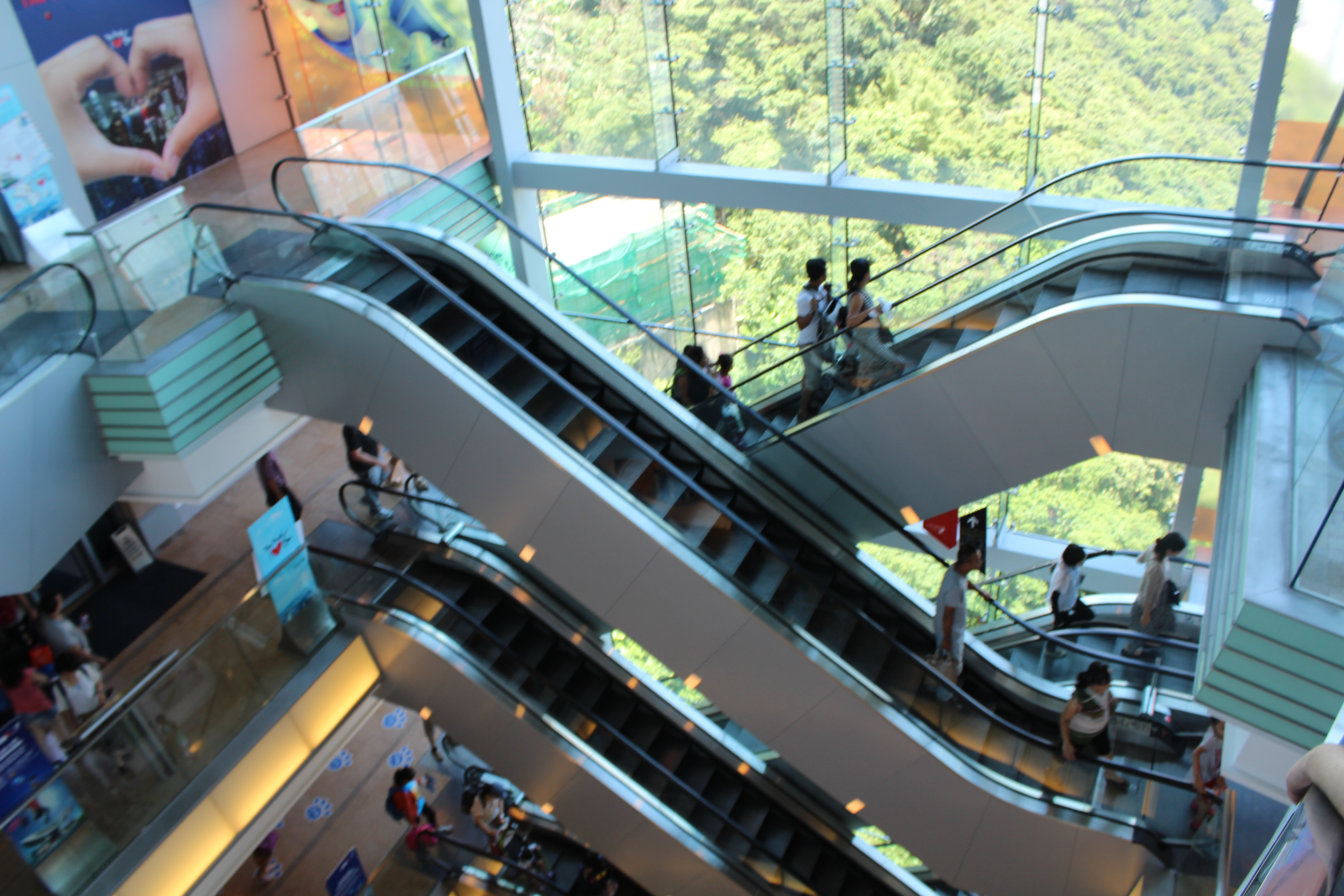
Interior of The Peak Tower

=== First design ===
The first peak Tower was designed by Hong Kong architect Chung Wah Nan. Construction started in 1971, and it was opened to the public on 29 August 1972.

The Tower Restaurant, a western restaurant, opened in the same year. It was situated on the top deck while the Peak Coffee Shop was located on the floor below. Both the upper floors were supported by two columns allowing a clear space between the upper and lower parts of the tower. This design feature has been retained in the redeveloped tower, but with quite a different shape to the upper section. On the ground floor of the building, there was a Chinese restaurant. It was open until 1981.

The first tower was demolished in 1993 and a groundbreaking ceremony on the new tower was held later the same year.

=== Second design ===
The current Peak Tower was the work of the British architect Terry Farrell, and was completed in 1997. It has seven floors with a total area of 10,400 m² (112,000 ft²) with a wok shape at the top. A viewing platform located on the third floor overlooks Victoria Harbour.

The building was altered from 2005–2006 at a cost of $100 million. The lower portion was glassed in to increase retail space, and the escalators were relocated. The Peak Tower now has eight floors with the viewing terrace relocated to the top of the building (at the top of the 'wok' shape) that overlooks both Victoria Harbour and Aberdeen (SW of the Hong Kong Island); however, severe air pollution often hinders the outlook from this venue.

== Attractions ==
Apart from the Peak Tram terminal, viewing terrace, and gift shops, the tower also included several attractions: Ripley's Believe It or Not! Odditorium, Hong Kong's Historical Adventure (a journey through scenes of the Hong Kong's early history, and the first computer-operated entertainment ride in Hong Kong) and the Peak Explorer Motion Simulator.

In 2000, after the closure of Hong Kong's Historical Adventure, Madame Tussauds Hong Kong moved in to occupy the former vacated premises to become the first Madame Tussauds permanent outlet in the Asia-Pacific region.

The Peak Tower is located close to a second leisure and shopping centre, the Peak Galleria, built atop the bus station used by the public buses and green minibuses that serve the Peak.
