= Victoria Hospital, Hong Kong =

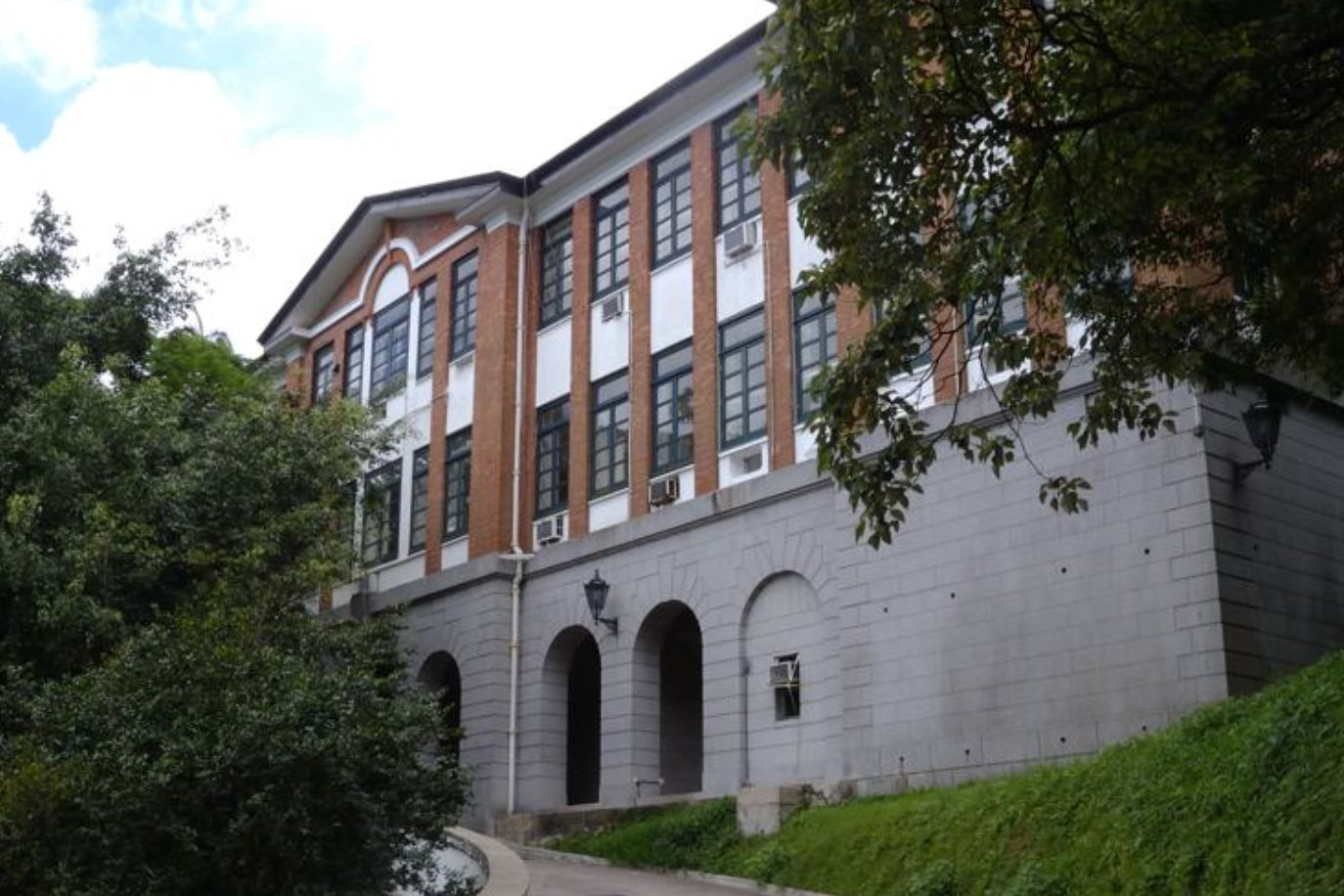
- Victoria flats, former Maternity Ward of the Victoria Hospital

Geography
- Location: Barker Road, The Peak, Hong Kong
- Coordinates: 22.270362°N 114.15868°E

History
- Founded: 22 June 1897
- Closed: December 1947

Old Victoria Hospital
- Traditional Chinese: 舊域多利醫院
Transcriptions
Yue: Cantonese
- Yale Romanization: Gauh wihk dō leih yī yún
- Jyutping: Gau6 wik4 do1 lei6 ji1 jyun2

Victoria Hospital was a hospital in Hong Kong. Previously called Victoria Jubilee Hospital, the hospital was named to commemorate the jubilee of Queen Victoria. The foundation stone for the hospital was laid on 22 June 1897. Operation commenced on 7 November 1903 and in December 1947. The hospital buildings were severely damaged during the Second World War and it was decided that the buildings (except for the maternity block) should be demolished to make way for civil servant housing.

== Fund raising and foundation stone ==
In commemoration of the completion of Queen Victoria’s sixtieth anniversary of her reign, the Jubilee Committee started to collect money to celebrate this anniversary. The committee launched a fund for the erection of a hospital in Hong Kong. The Governor Sir William Robinson unveiled the foundation stone to mark the commencement of construction "Victoria Hospital" on 23 June 1897.

== Opening of the hospital ==
The 1903 Public Works Report the following is stated:

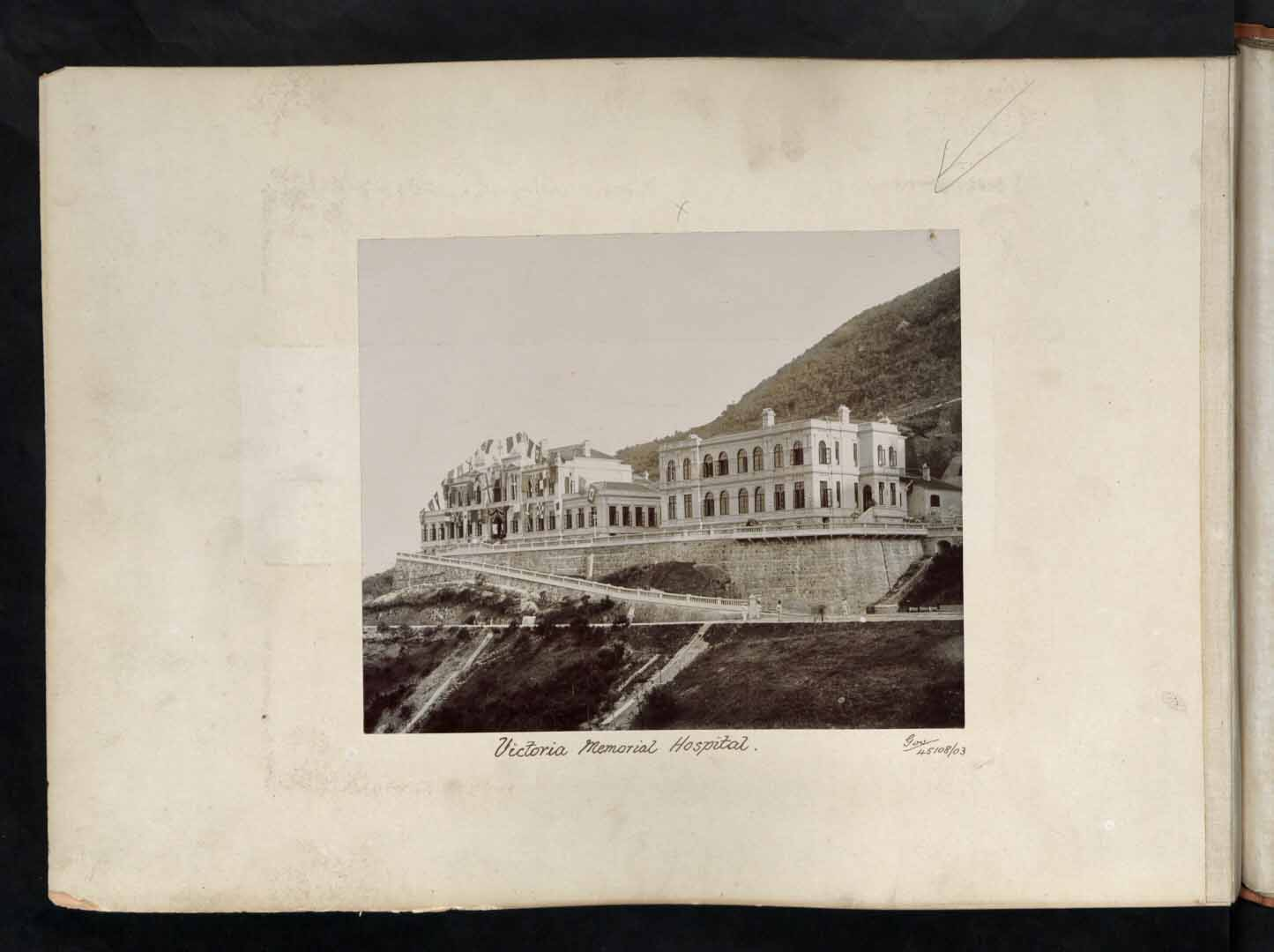
Victoria Hospital Hong Kong 1903

In accordance with the arrangements made when the Jubilee Fund was started in 1897, the buildings, which had reached completion, were formally handed over to Government on the 7th November. The site for the hospital which is on Barker Road, about 1,100 feet above sea level, was granted by the Government and on it, after performing the necessary levelling operations including the construction of retaining walls, the Jubilee Committee erected the buildings, Messrs. PALMER & Turner being the Architects.

The main building consists of two floors containing two general wards ( 12 beds each), a children's ward (8 beds) and 4 private wards (1, 2, 4 and 5 beds respectively) a total of 44 beds. There are also 2 Sisters’ rooms, an office, entrance hall and staircase, an operating theatre and an isolation ward; the two latter being situated in separate wings connected by covered ways with the rest of the building. A drying-room and the necessary lavatory, scullery and bathroom accommodation are provided.

Separated a little way from the main building, but connected with it by a covered way, are the quarters for the staff, consisting of a pair of semi-detached 5-roomed houses, with bathrooms, kitchens and servants’ quarters. The kitchens and servants’ quarters connected with the hospital are conveniently arranged in a detached wing in the rear of the main buildings. A mortuary is also provided.

[...]

The total expenditure upon the work, including architects’ fees, preparing site, &c., was $118,891.05, the Government contribution amounting to $3,342.43. The preparation of the site, &c., cost $7,500 and the superstructure, including the necessary fittings, $100,994.97, the balance of the expenditure being for architects’ fees, supervision, &c.

== Extension and Annexes ==
In 1923, a Maternity Ward was opened that was built west of the hospital. The ward has two floors, providing accommodation for 6 first, 10 second, and 4 third class patients, as well as all necessary offices. In 1924, a new block was built and the existing ones were raised in height by adding an additional storey. Additional rooms for doctors, nurses, and a new kitchen were available by this extension.

== Damage and demolition ==
During World War II, the hospital was heavily damaged and looted afterwards. In 1947, the hospital was demolished as it was beyond repair. On this place, Victoria House was built in 1951. The Maternity Ward was not so badly damaged and was repaired and is now referred to as Victoria Flats.
