= Headquarters House, Hong Kong =

Residence of the Commander of the PLA Hong Kong Garrison

Coordinates: 22°16′15″N 114°09′39″E

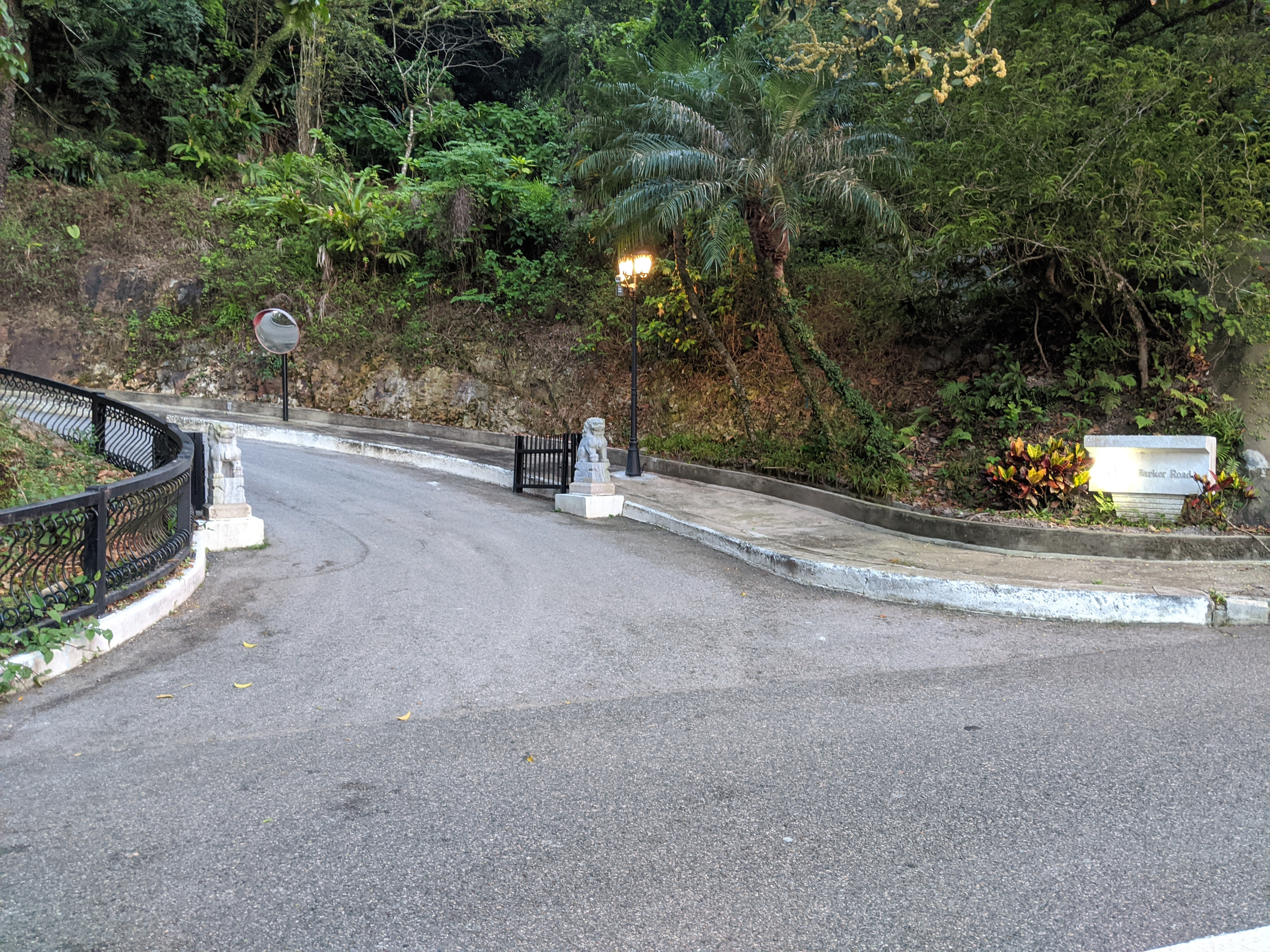
Entrance to Headquarters House, 11 Barker Road

The Headquarters House, located at 11 Barker Road in Hong Kong was the residence of the Commander British Forces in Hong Kong from 1978 to 1997. Since the Handover of Hong Kong in 1997, the current Commander of the People's Liberation Army Hong Kong Garrison has resided there.

A private road from Barker Road was used to access the home for those who had the required security clearance. Nearby are two other official residences, namely the one for the Chief Secretary for Administration at 15 Barker Road, and the one for Secretary for Justice at 19 Severn Road.

In 1978, it replaced the old Headquarters House (Flagstaff House) at 10 Cotton Tree Drive, which is now the Museum of Tea Ware in Hong Kong.
