= Central Terminus =

Funicular station on Hong Kong's Peak Tram

Coordinates: 22.277729°N 114.159172°E

Central Terminus 中環總站
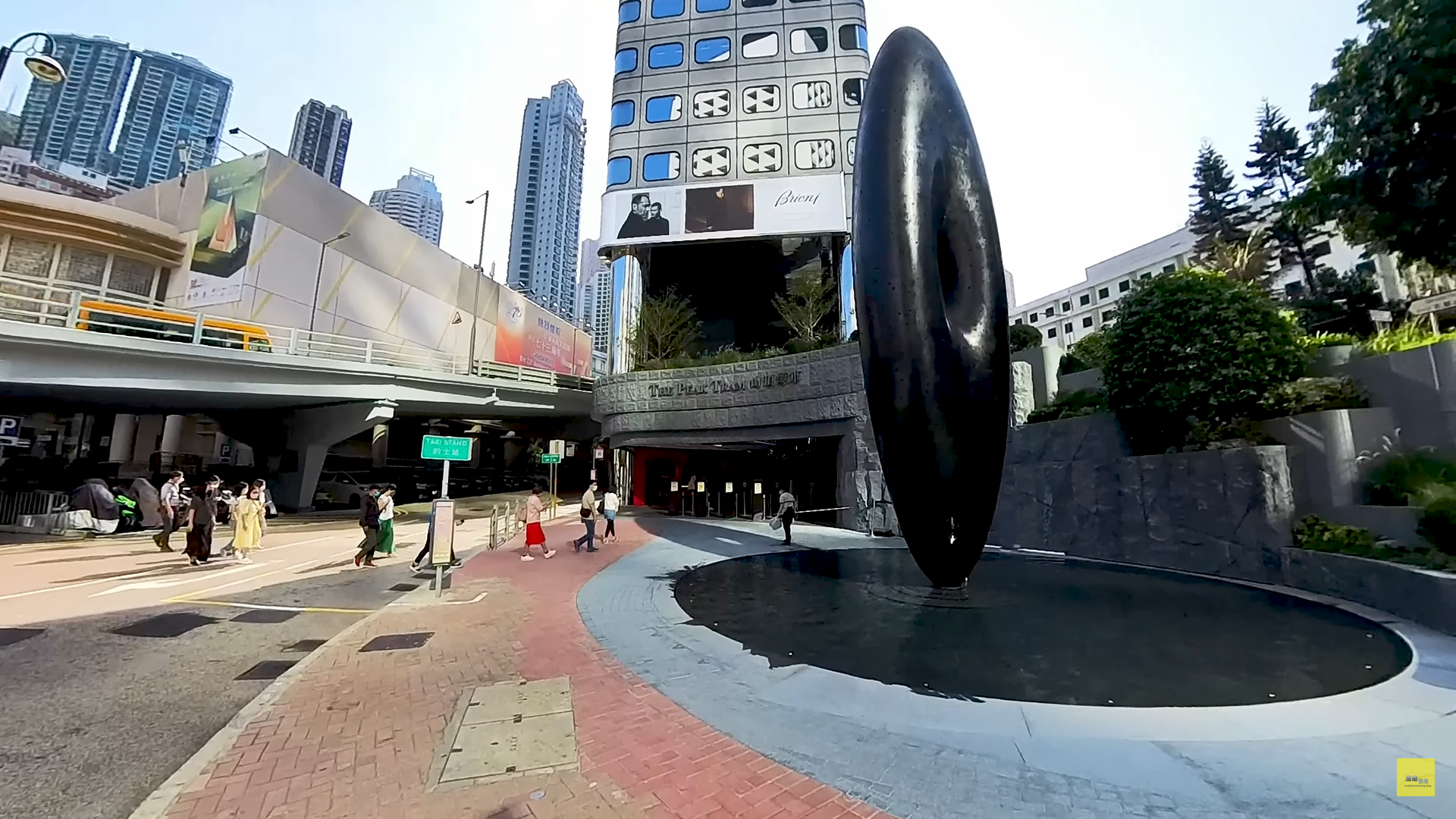
- The Central Terminus after renovation in 2022

General information
- Other names: Garden Road, Lower Terminus
- Location: St. John's Building, Garden Road, Central; Central and Western District; Hong Kong
- Elevation: 33 metres (108 ft)
- Line: Peak Tram
- Platforms: 2 side platforms
- Tracks: 1

History
- Opened: 30 May 1888; 138 years ago

Services
Preceding stop	The Peninsula Hotels	Following stop
Terminus	Peak Tram	Kennedy Road towards The Peak Terminus
Location

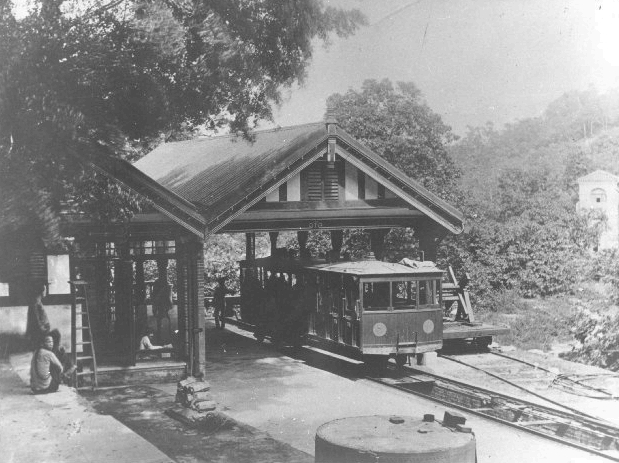
Peak Tram lower terminus in the 1890s

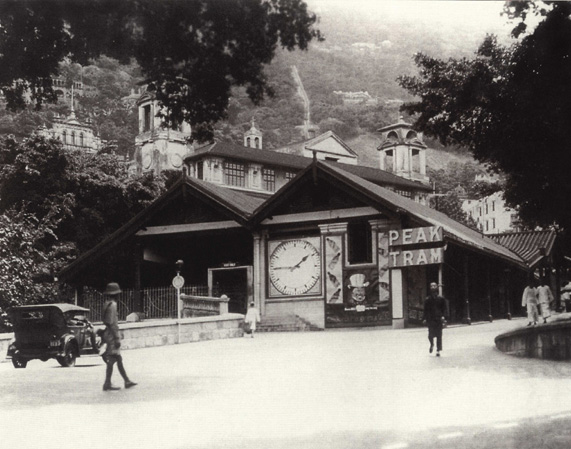
Peak Tram lower terminus in the 1920s

Central Terminus (Chinese: 中環總站; Jyutping: zung1 waan4 zung2 zaam6), formerly Garden Road (Chinese: 花園道; Jyutping: faa1 jyun4 dou6), is the lower terminus of the Peak Tram line. It is located on the bottom floor of the St. John's Building on Garden Road, Central, Hong Kong, 33m above sea level, 28m before renovation.

The current station comprises a single track, with platforms on both sides. One platform is used for boarding, the other for exiting the tram. As the Peak Tram is a major Hong Kong tourist attraction, long queues are common in front of the turnstiles at Central Terminus.

== History ==
The Garden Road station for the Peak Tram opened on 30 May 1888. In 1935, a new terminus was built along with the St John's Apartments: a reinforced concrete building, with eight studio flats and a two-bedroom penthouse. In 1964, the apartments were demolished to make way for a modern 14-storey commercial and residential building. This building was in turn replaced by the current 22-storey building.

Under the Peak Tram Upgrade Project, the terminus was temporarily closed on 23 April 2019, with temporary platforms, located 70 metres uphill from the former platforms, opened on 22 July, and again closed on 28 June 2021. The renovated station, with platforms at the then temporary site, was reopened and renamed to "Central Terminus" on 27 August 2022.

== Neighbouring landmarks ==
- Central Government Offices
- U.S. Consulate General
- St. John's Cathedral
- Hong Kong Park
- Hong Kong Zoological and Botanical Gardens
- St. Joseph's College
- Murray Building
- Bank of China Tower

== Feeder transport ==
NWFB Route 15C is operated between Central Ferry Piers and Garden Road Peak Tram Terminus with only single decker buses, and previously open-top double decker buses. The fare is exactly HK$4.2.

Island line and Tsuen Wan line Central station Exit J2 or Admiralty station Exit C
