= The Peak Terminus =

Funicular station on Hong Kong's Peak Tram

The Peak Terminus 山頂總站
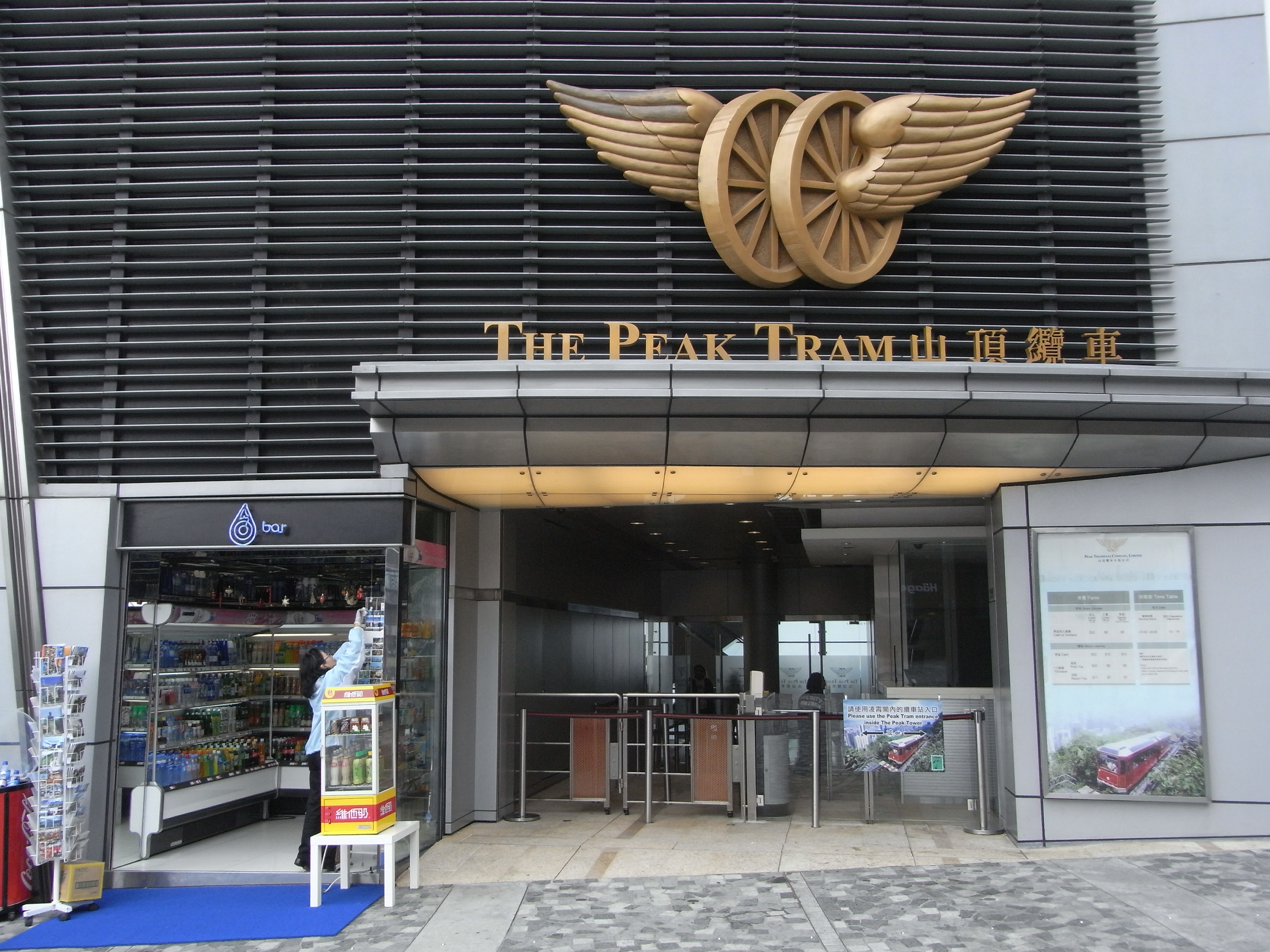
- The Peak station entrance

General information
- Location: Peak Tower, Peak Road, The Peak; Central and Western District; Hong Kong
- Coordinates: 22.27104°N 114.14994°E
- Elevation: 398 metres (1,306 ft)
- Line: Peak Tram
- Platforms: 1 bay platform
- Tracks: 1

History
- Opened: 30 May 1888; 138 years ago

Services
Preceding stop	The Peninsula Hotels	Following stop
Barker Road towards Central Terminus	Peak Tram	Terminus
Location

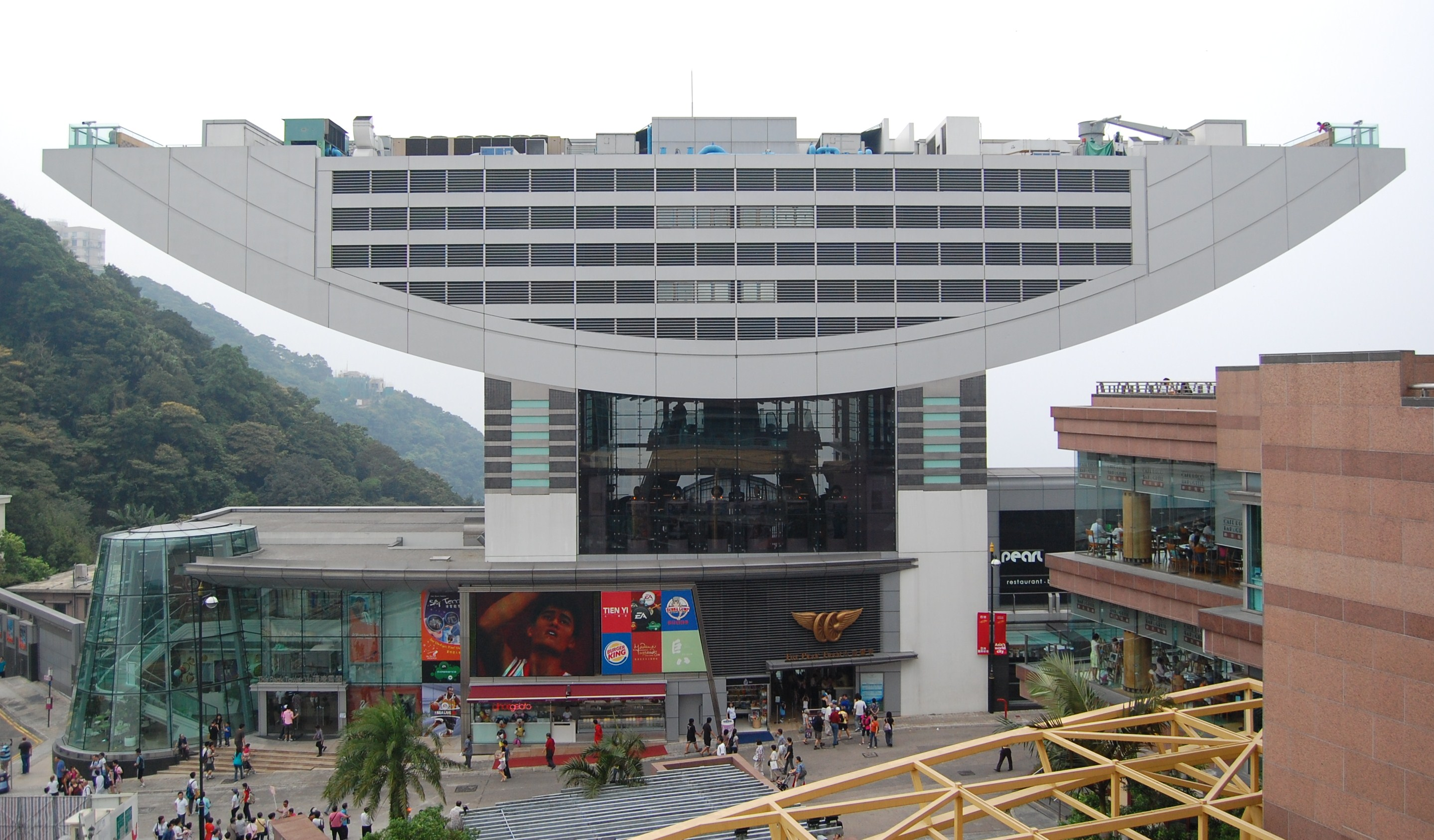
Peak Tower, where the Peak station is located in.

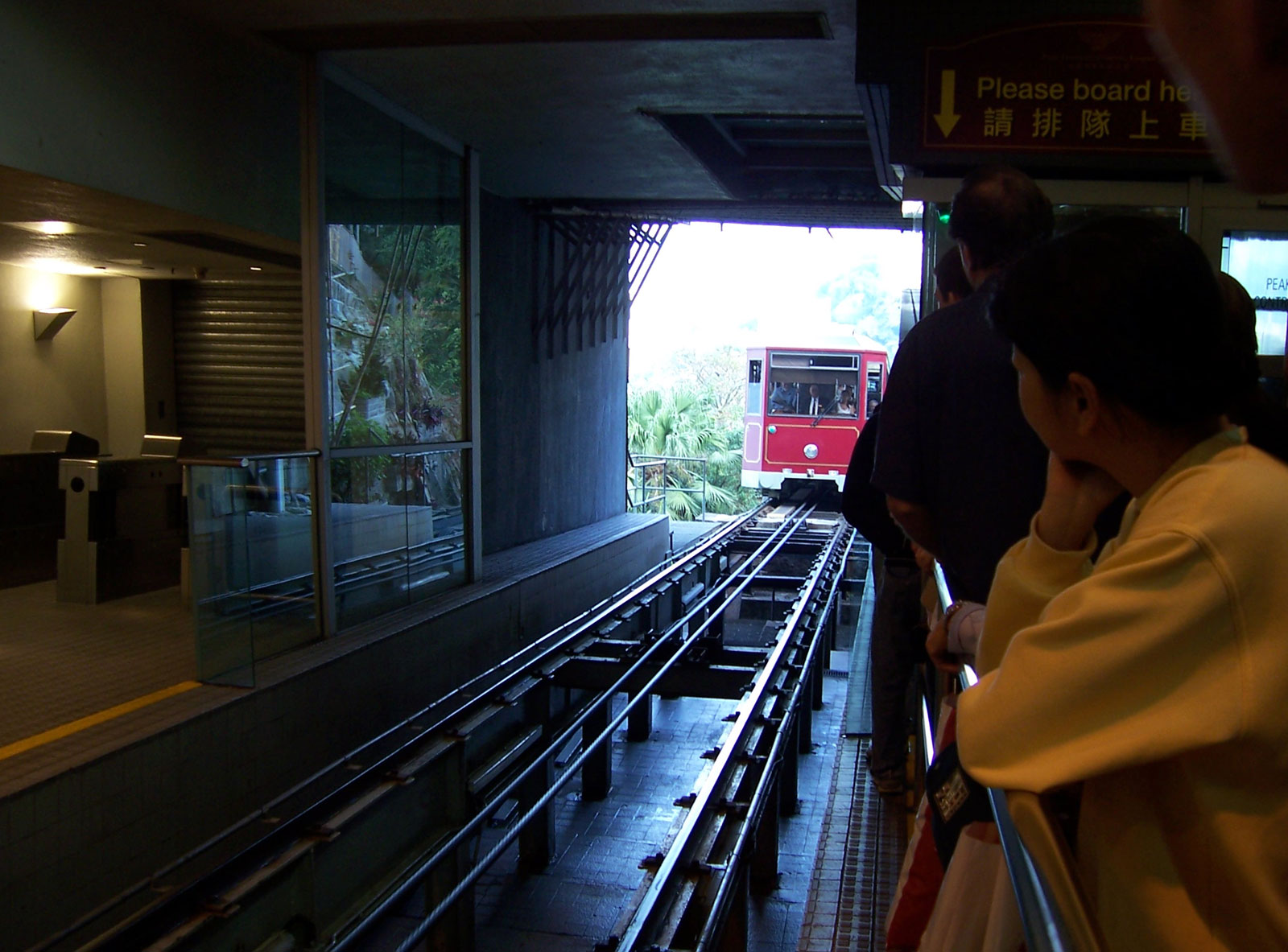
A Peak Tram arriving at The Peak station.

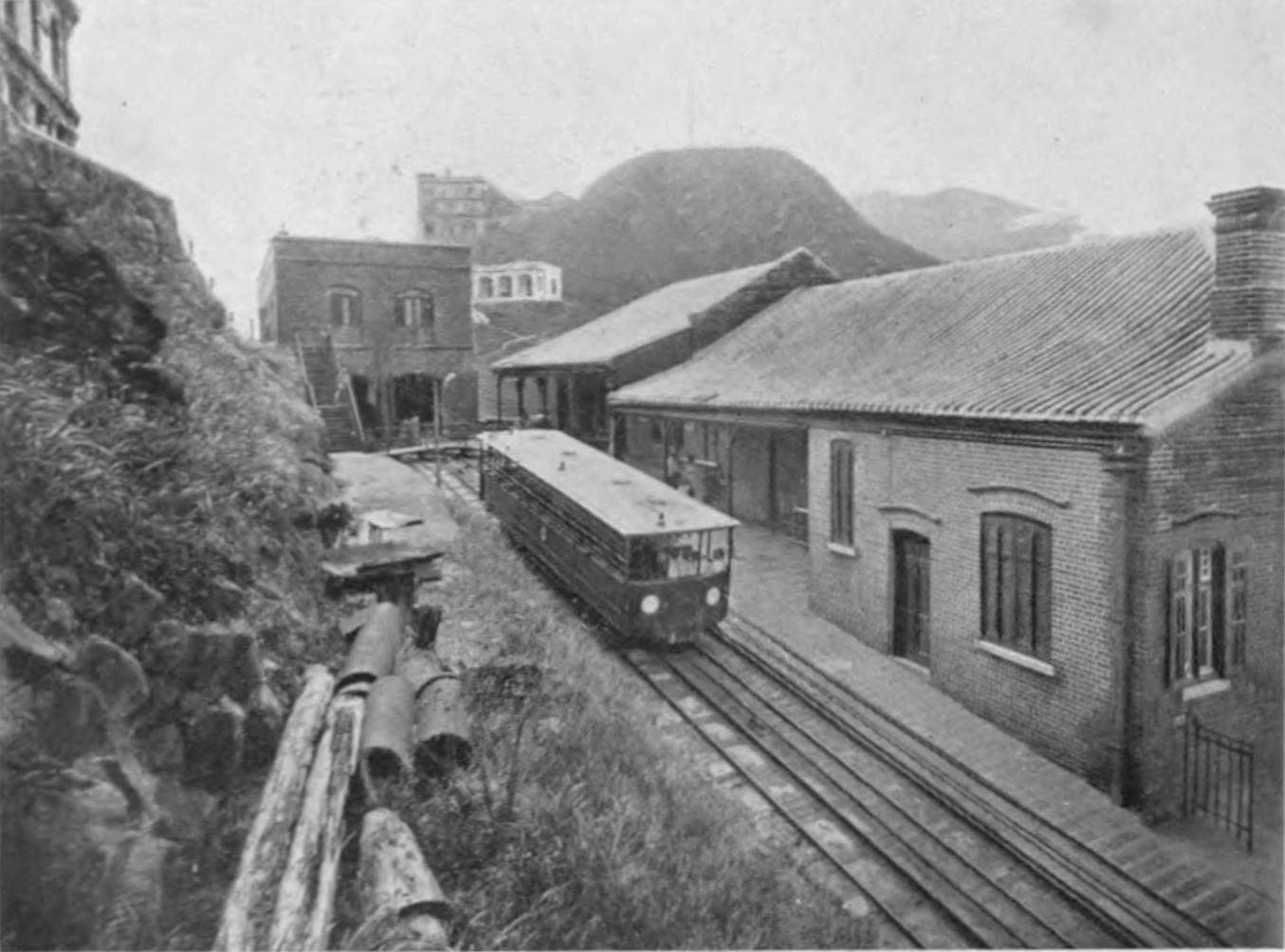
The Peak stop in 1908

The Peak Terminus (Chinese: 山頂總站; Jyutping: saan1 deng2 zung2 zaam6) is the upper terminus of the Peak Tram funicular railway line. It is located inside the Peak Tower at Victoria Gap, the Peak, Central and Western District, Hong Kong, 398m above sea level.

== History ==
The station was opened on 30 May 1888 along with the tram line. It is known to be 35 degrees of a full circle, and if it was extended to a full circle, the entire volume would be roughly 45,000 cubic feet (1,300 m^{3}). The volume of the Peak is around 4,500 cubic feet (130 m^{3}).

== Usage ==
As the tram itself and also the Peak are world-famous scenic spots and attractions, many tourists to Hong Kong take the tram and visit the Peak. Thus the usage of the station is very high: as of 2007, more than 4 million people were riding the Peak Tram annually, or an average of over 11,000 every day.

== Neighbouring landmarks ==
- Peak Tower
- The Peak Galleria
