= List of restaurants owned or operated by Gordon Ramsay =

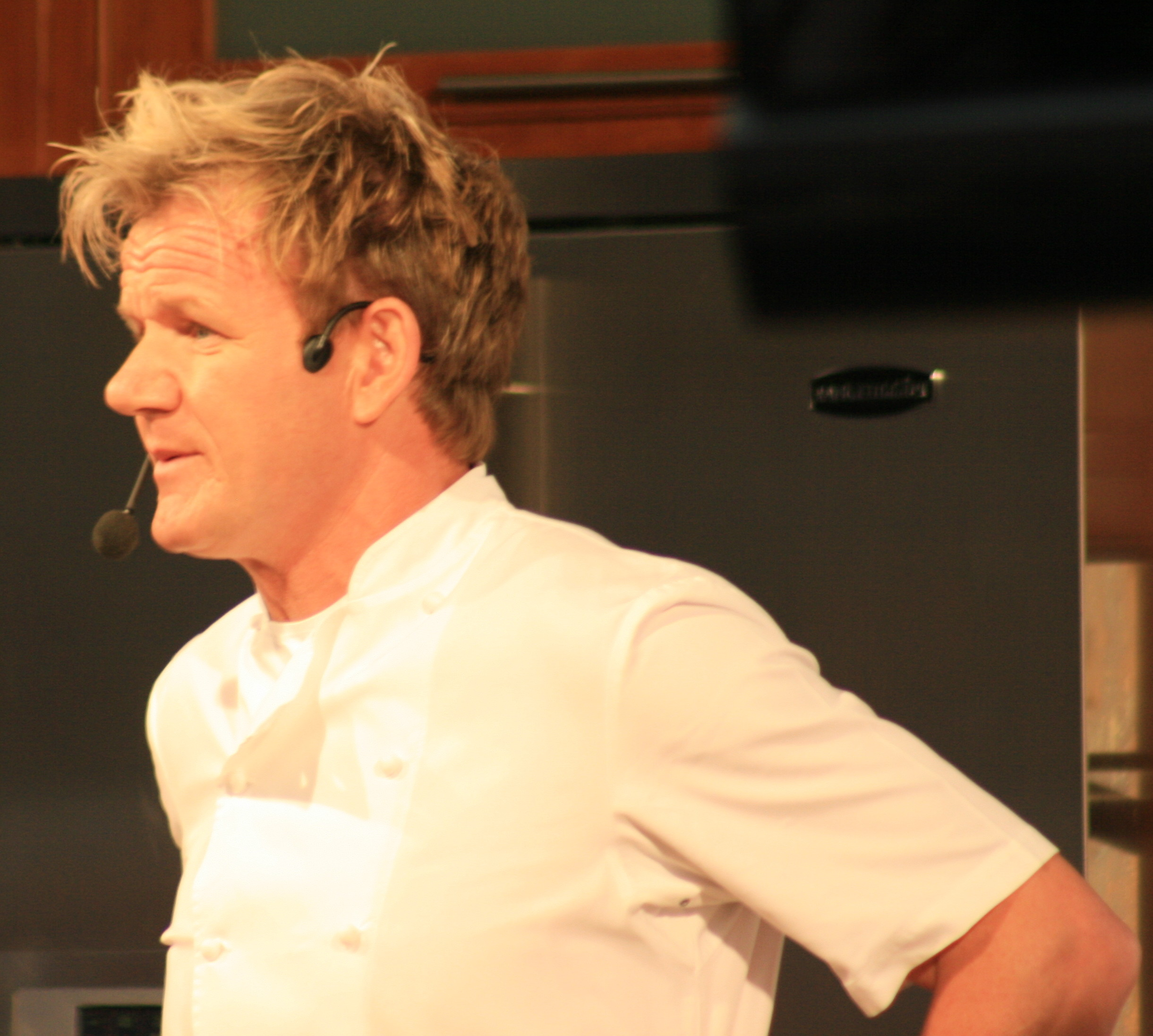
Gordon Ramsay (2008)

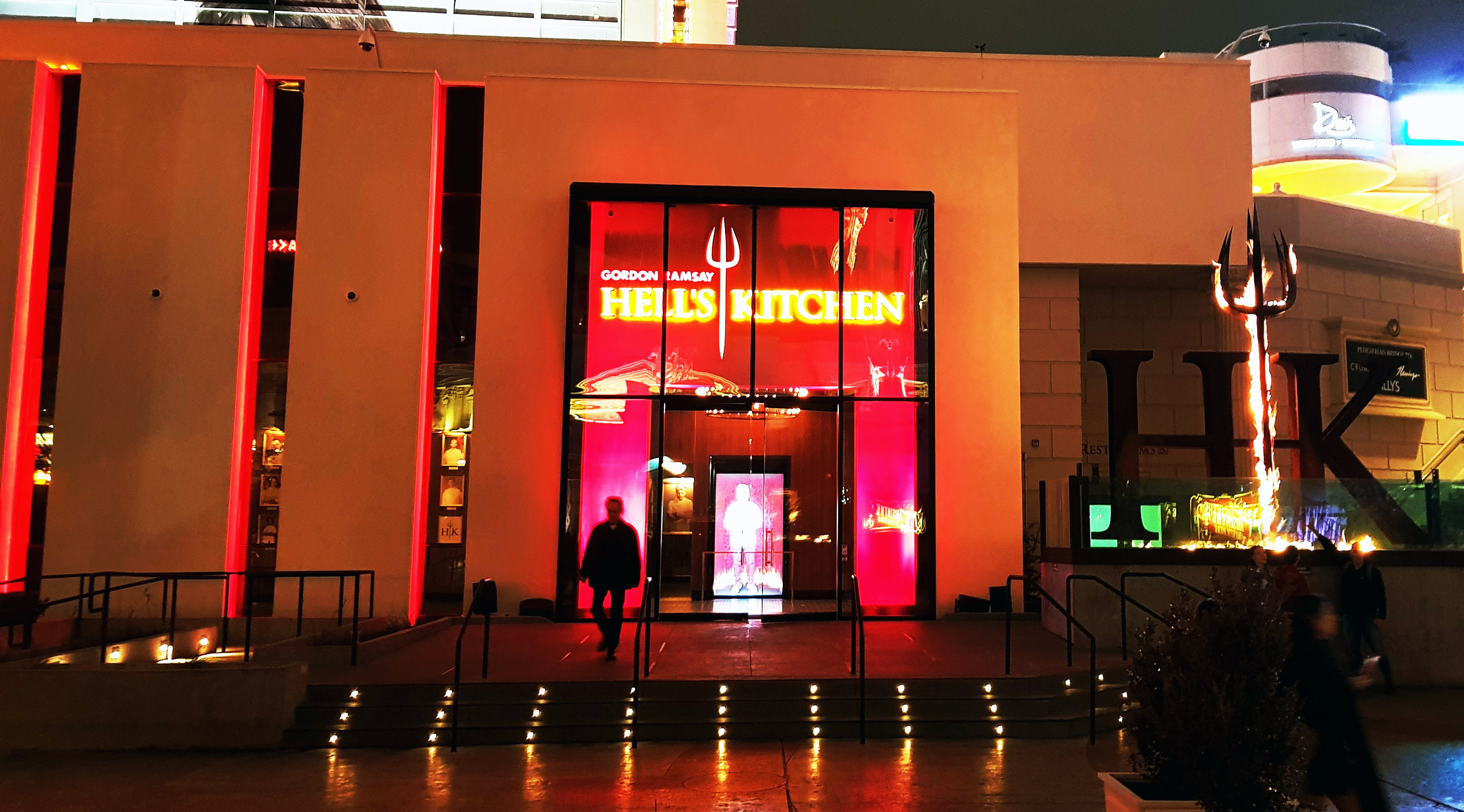
Gordon Ramsay Hell's Kitchen at Caesars Palace Las Vegas (Jan. 2019)

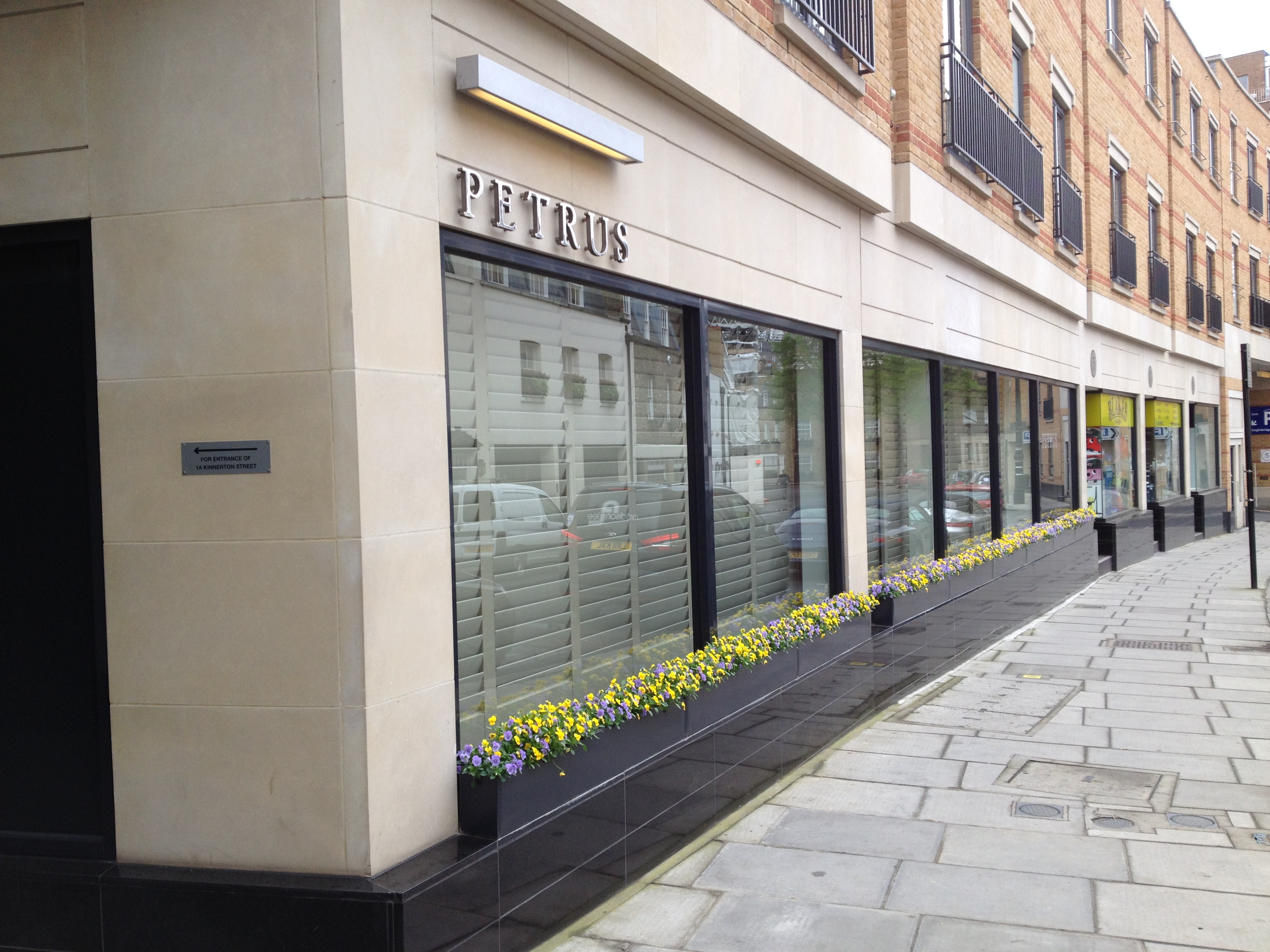
Pétrus by Gordon Ramsay on Kinnerton Street in London (April 2014)

Gordon Ramsay is a British chef, restaurateur, writer and television personality. He has owned or operated multiple restaurants across Europe, North America and Asia. This is a list of the notable such restaurants, including many which have since closed. As of late-2024, the organisation lists 90 restaurants currently open worldwide.

Ramsay founded his first restaurant group, Gordon Ramsay Restaurants, in 1997. He has owned and operated a number of restaurants since he first became head chef of Aubergine in 1993. He owned 25% of that restaurant, where he earned his first two Michelin stars. Following the dismissal of protege Marcus Wareing from sister restaurant L'Oranger, Ramsay organised a staff walkout from both restaurants and subsequently took them to open up Restaurant Gordon Ramsay, at Royal Hospital Road, London. His self-titled restaurant went on to become his first and only three Michelin star restaurant.

Ramsay has installed a number of proteges in restaurants. Both Angela Hartnett and Jason Atherton worked at Verre before moving back to London to The Connaught and Maze respectively. Atherton left to open his own restaurant, and Hartnett purchased Murano from Ramsay in 2010. Wareing was made head chef of London-based restaurant Pétrus. It went on to win two Michelin stars, but in 2008 the two chefs fell out; Wareing kept the restaurant premises and the stars, while Ramsay received rights to the name. The restaurant was renamed Marcus Wareing at the Berkeley, while in 2010 the new Pétrus by Gordon Ramsay was opened.

Ramsay has launched several Hell's Kitchen-themed restaurants based on the TV show he has hosted. The first Gordon Ramsay Hell's Kitchen restaurant opened in front of Caesars Palace on the Las Vegas Strip in January 2018. Ramsay has also created other chains and individual restaurants in various countries.

== Restaurants ==
Restaurant	Location	Opened	Closed (Note: Closed, or else Gordon Ramsay's involvement ended)	Michelin star(s)	Ref(s)
Gordon Ramsay Fish & Chips	Las Vegas, Nevada, United States	2016			
Gordon Ramsay Hell's Kitchen	Miami, Florida, United States	2023			
Amaryllis	Glasgow, Scotland, United Kingdom	2001	2004	Michelin Guide (2002–04)	
Angela Hartnett at The Connaught	London, England, United Kingdom	2002	13 September 2007	Michelin Guide (2004–07)	
Aubergine (Note: The Aubergine location later became the Park Walk site of Maze Grill)	London, England, United Kingdom	1993	1998 (Note: Gordon Ramsay's involvement ended in 1998, but Aubergine remained open until 8 September 2010.)	Michelin Guide (1997–99)	
Bread Street Kitchen & Bar	London, England, United Kingdom (St. Paul's)	26 September 2011	–		
Bread Street Kitchen	Singapore	23 June 2015	–		
Bread Street Kitchen & Bar	Hong Kong, China	18 September 2015 (Note: From September 2015 to August 2018 this location was at the Lan Kwai Fong Hotel, then moved to The Peak (~⅓ mile away, on the other side of the Hong Kong Zoo) and stayed there from February 2019 until it closed on 1 April 2020.)	1 April 2020		
The Fat Cow	Los Angeles, California, United States	1 October 2012	27 March 2014		
Foxtrot Oscar (Note: The Foxtrot Oscar location later became the Royal Hospital Road site of Maze Grill; since 2021 it has been the 2nd site for Gordon Ramsay Bar & Grill)	London, England, United Kingdom	21 January 2008	April 2015		
Gordon Ramsay at Claridge's	London, England, United Kingdom	2001	30 June 2013	Michelin Guide (2002–09)	
Gordon Ramsay Hell's Kitchen	Las Vegas, Nevada, United States	26 January 2018	–		
Gordon Ramsay Plane Food	London, England, United Kingdom	27 March 2007	–		
La Noisette (Note: La Noisette was on the same site in Sloane Square as Pengelley's restaurant, which Gordon Ramsay Holdings was a minor shareholder in. After La Noisette closed, the site was used as a private dining location by the group.)	London, England, United Kingdom	2007	7 March 2008	Michelin Guide (2007–08)	
Le Pressoir d'Argent	Bordeaux, France	10 September 2015	–	Michelin Guide (2016–present)	
Murano	London, England, United Kingdom	21 August 2008	8 October 2010	Michelin Guide (2009–2010)	
Pétrus (Note: Pétrus was operated by Marcus Wareing until 2008, when it became Marcus Wareing at the Berkeley. The two Michelin stars were retained by Wareing. A new restaurant called Pétrus by Gordon Ramsay was later opened nearby in Kinnerton Street under Sean Burbidge in 2010.)	London, England, United Kingdom	22 March 1999	May 2008	Michelin Guide (2007–09)	
Pétrus by Gordon Ramsay	London, England, United Kingdom	29 March 2010	–	Michelin Guide (2011–present)	
Restaurant Gordon Ramsay (Note: Since 2020, Restaurant Gordon Ramsey has been co-owned and run by Chef Patron Matt Abé)	London, England, United Kingdom	17 September 1998	– (Note: Since 2020, Restaurant Gordon Ramsey has been co-owned and run by Chef Patron Matt Abé)	Michelin Guide (2001–present)	
Savoy Grill	London, England, United Kingdom	2003 (Note: The Savoy Grill originally opened in 1889 along with the hotel. Gordon Ramsay became involved in 2003. In December 2007, the restaurant closed temporarily as the Savoy Hotel underwent a thorough refurbishment, but it opened again on 29 November 2010.)	–	Michelin Guide (2003–06)	
Union Street Café (Note: Union Street Café was replaced in December 2020 by the third Street Pizza Location, joined at that address in May 2021 by London's second Bread Street Kitchen & Bar)	London, England, United Kingdom	16 October 2013	2020		
Verre	Dubai, United Arab Emirates	1 October 2001	28 October 2011		
Restaurant Gordon Ramsay High	London, England, United Kingdom	4 February 2025		Michelin Guide (2026–present)	

== See also ==
- Lists of restaurants
