= New Change =

New Change may refer to:

- A street in London, replacing Old Change that was demolished during World War II
- One New Change, a shopping area in the City of London
