= Union Street Café =

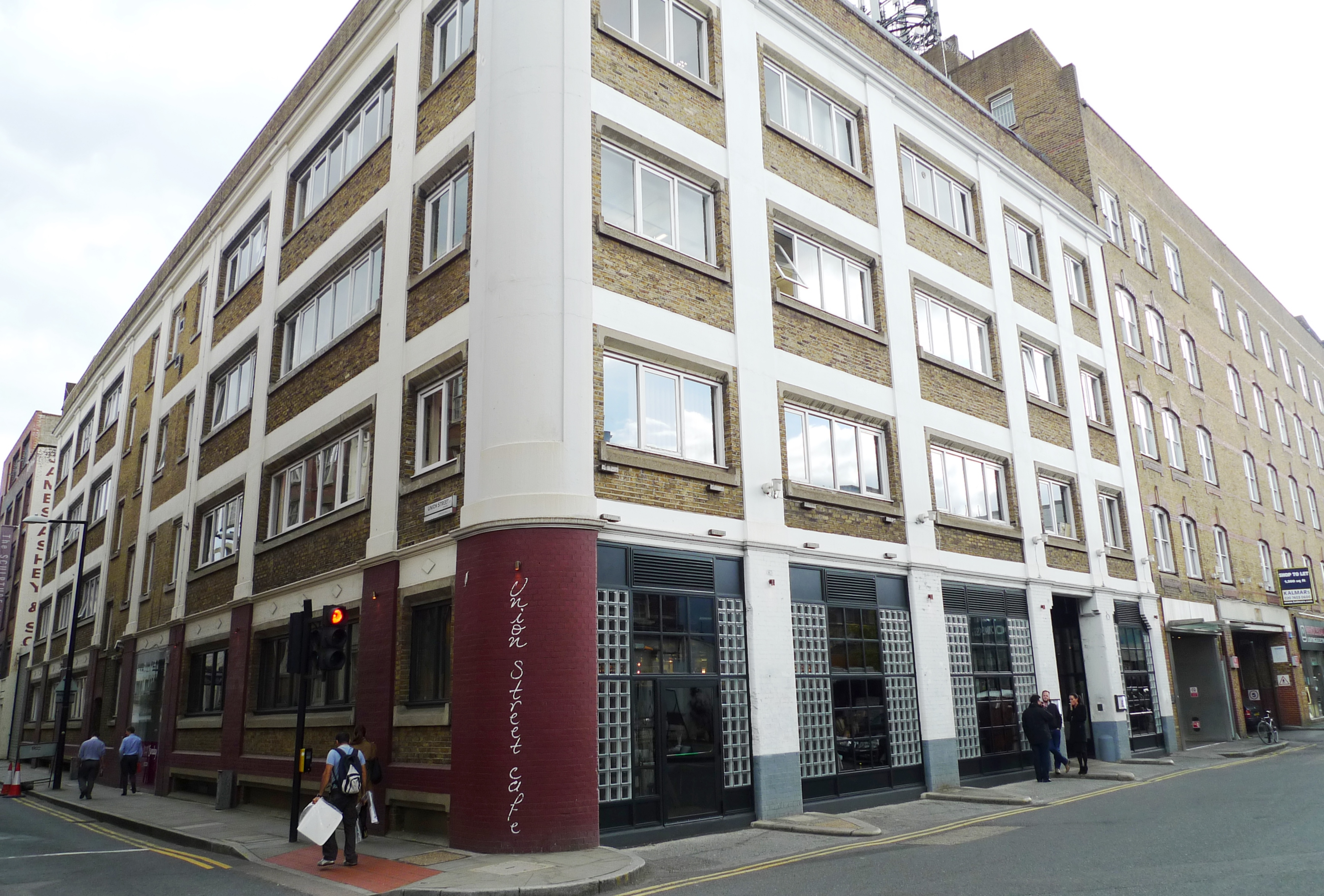

- The location of the restaurant within Greater London

Restaurant information
- Established: 16 September 2013 (12 years ago)
- Closed: 2020 (6 years ago)
- Owner: Gordon Ramsay
- Head chef: Davide Degiovanni
- Chef: Gordon Ramsay
- Food type: Italian cuisine
- Location: 47-51 Great Suffolk Street, Southwark, London, SE1 0BS, United Kingdom
- Coordinates: 51.503591°N 0.101272°W
- Seating capacity: 99 covers
- Website: gordonramsay.com/union-street-cafe

Union Street Café was a restaurant, owned by chef Gordon Ramsay, in Southwark, London, United Kingdom.

It was the first of Ramsay's restaurants to be opened without the involvement of Chris Hutchinson, and at one point was backed by footballer David Beckham.

The café served Mediterranean cuisine, with mostly Italian dishes. The head chef, Davide Degiovanni, designed the menu, which was changed daily. Before the café was opened, it received more than 10,000 booking requests, with seating filled to the end of the year. Food critics' reviews were mixed, with differing opinions of the veal saltimbocca but agreement in dislike of a dish of octopus, borlotti bean, and 'nduja sausage.

Union Street Café was replaced by Gordon Ramsay Restaurants in December 2020 with their third Street Pizza Location, joined at that address in May 2021 by their second Bread Street Kitchen & Bar location for London.

== History ==
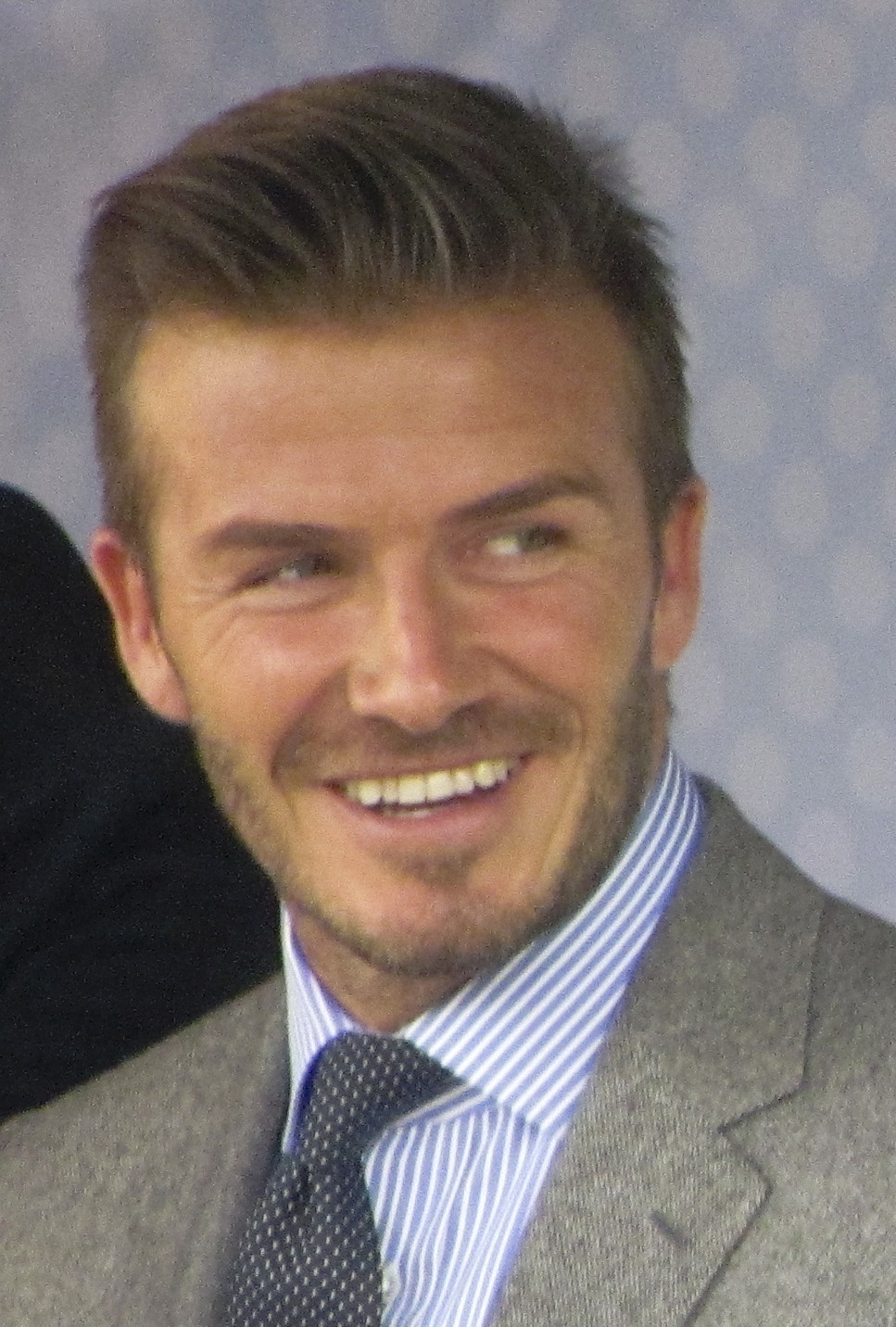
At one point, footballer David Beckham had invested in the restaurant.

The Union Street Café was the first restaurant opened by Gordon Ramsay Holdings without the involvement of Gordon Ramsay's father-in-law, Chris Hutchinson. Initially, English footballer David Beckham was an investor in the restaurant, but he withdrew his support prior to launch.

The interior of the restaurant was decorated in an industrial style designed by Russell Sage, who had previously created the interior of Ramsay's Bread Street Kitchen. It had revealed concrete columns, ventilation shafts and without tablecloths on the tables. The location was formerly a loading bay, and the interior design incorporated several original elements into the dining space.

The restaurant was located on the ground floor of Harling House and contained space for ninety-nine diners.

Following the launch of the restaurant's website, it received over 10,000 requests before opening. At launch, it was said to be fully booked until the end of the year. The launch party was held on 16 October 2013.

== Menu ==
Due to the restaurant's location, prior to opening it was said that they would use fresh produce from suppliers in nearby Borough Market. These included items such as mussels from Wales and clams from Cornwall. The menu was described by the restaurant as "Mediterranean", but was said to be predominantly Italian cuisine by reviewers. The menu itself was changed on a daily basis, and designed by head chef Davide Degiovanni. He and Ramsay developed the initial range of dishes together.

== Reception ==
Food critic Matthew Norman attended the restaurant on the day after opening. He said in his review for The Daily Telegraph, that the veal saltimbocca was too salty, and found other courses "blisteringly average" or "forgettably adequate". Norman also did not see the point of the Parmesan-skin appetisers, saying that they were "bemusing". He gave the restaurant two out of five stars. John Walsh, for The Independent, found the linguine vongole to have "most buttery pasta [he had] ever eaten", and said that the saltimbocca was "astonishing" and that "the chef deserves a medal for keeping this dish simple, dramatic and irresistible." He gave Union Street Café four out of five for both food and service, and three out of five for ambience.

In the review in Time Out, the portion sizes were said to be "considered meagre in the boot of Italy" but certain dishes such as the Parmesan-skin appetisers and the chocolate and peanut-butter cake were singled out for praise. Marina O'Loughlin wrote in The Guardian said that the mushroom risotto was excellent, as was the homemade gelato. Her only criticism was towards a dish of octopus, borlotti beans and 'nduja. However, she found that her enjoyment of the restaurant was troubled by the sheer expectation of a new Gordon Ramsay restaurant and the media campaign that preceded the opening. She gave it seven out of ten for food, atmosphere and value for money.

David Sexton in London's Evening Standard, described the crudo of stone bass as "excellent" and found that the tagliolini with rabbit was the best thing on the menu. He also disliked the octopus dish, saying that the 'nduja overpowered the rest of the ingredients. Sexton felt that the cafe was a fully fledged restaurant and gave it three out of five stars.

== See also ==
- List of Italian restaurants
- List of restaurants in London
- List of restaurants owned or operated by Gordon Ramsay
