= Restaurant Gordon Ramsay High =

Restaurant in London, England

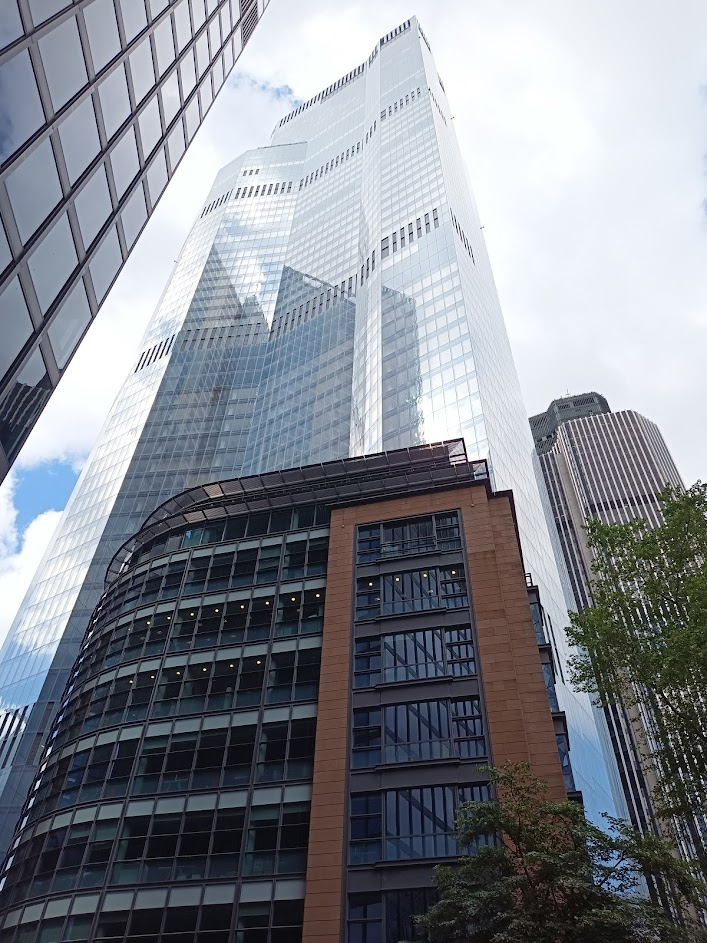
- The restaurant is located on the 60th floor of 22 Bishopsgate
- Interactive map of Restaurant Gordon Ramsay High

Restaurant information
- Established: February 2025
- Owner: Gordon Ramsay
- Head chef: James Goodyear
- Food type: Modern
- Rating: 1 Michelin star
- Location: 22 Bishopsgate, London, United Kingdom
- Coordinates: 51.514543°N 0.083229°W
- Website: www.gordonramsayrestaurants.com/high/bishopsgate/

Restaurant Gordon Ramsay High is a Michelin-starred restaurant in London, United Kingdom. It is located on the 60th floor of 22 Bishopsgate. James Goodyear acts as head chef.

== Background and setting ==
The restaurant was established in February 2025 by Gordon Ramsay. It opened on the 60th floor of 22 Bishopsgate, the tallest building within the City of London alongside Lucky Cat Restaurant and Bar and Gordon Ramsay Academy within the same building. Restaurant Gordon Ramsay High was awarded one Michelin-star in the 2026 guide, at 269m above ground, the guide claims it to be the tallest restaurant in Europe.

The restaurant features a single twelve-seater table facing the exterior with a view over London. Access requires a separate entrance to that of the main building. In May of 2026, a branch of Gordon Ramsay's Bread Street Kitchen & Bar was also opened in 22 Bishopsgate and would be his 100th restaurant.

== Reception ==
The restaurant was noted for the exceptional views afforded by the location as well as the intimate nature of the setting.

Jay Rayner, who had conflicts with Gordon Ramsay in the past described the restaurant as "£776 of meh" in his review for the Financial Times.

The restaurant received three stars out of five in Time Out.

== See also ==
- List of Michelin-starred restaurants in Greater London
- List of restaurants owned or operated by Gordon Ramsay
