= Hell's Kitchen (restaurant) =

Restaurant chain of the Gordon Ramsay Group

Gordon Ramsay Hell's Kitchen
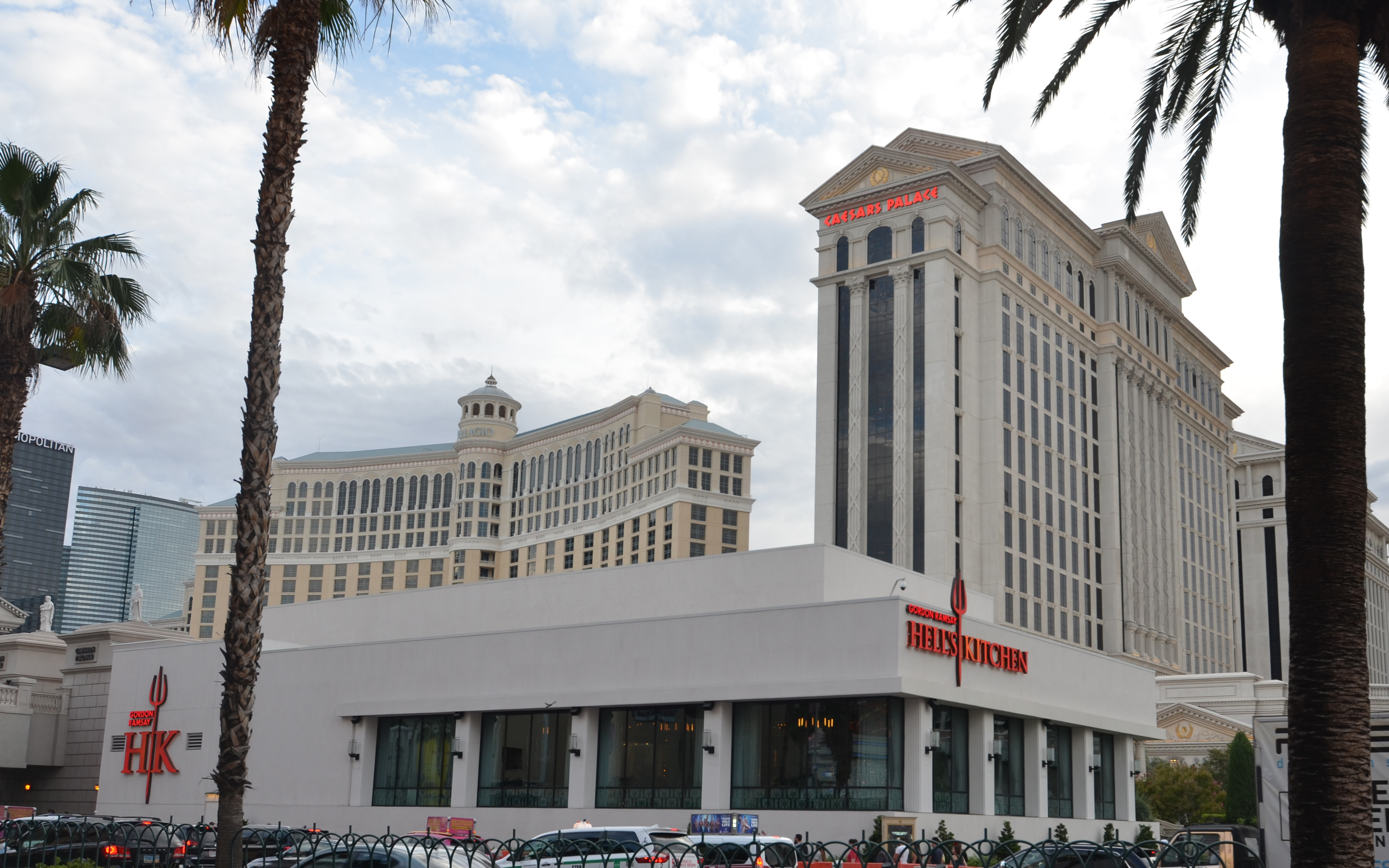

Restaurant information
- Established: January 2018; 8 years ago
- Owner: Gordon Ramsay Restaurants
- Dress code: Business casual
- Location: USA
- Reservations: Yes
- Website: USA

Gordon Ramsay Hell's Kitchen is a fine dining restaurant chain owned by British chef Gordon Ramsay and based on the reality TV show of the same name. As of 2023, the chain consists of seven United States locations.

== History ==
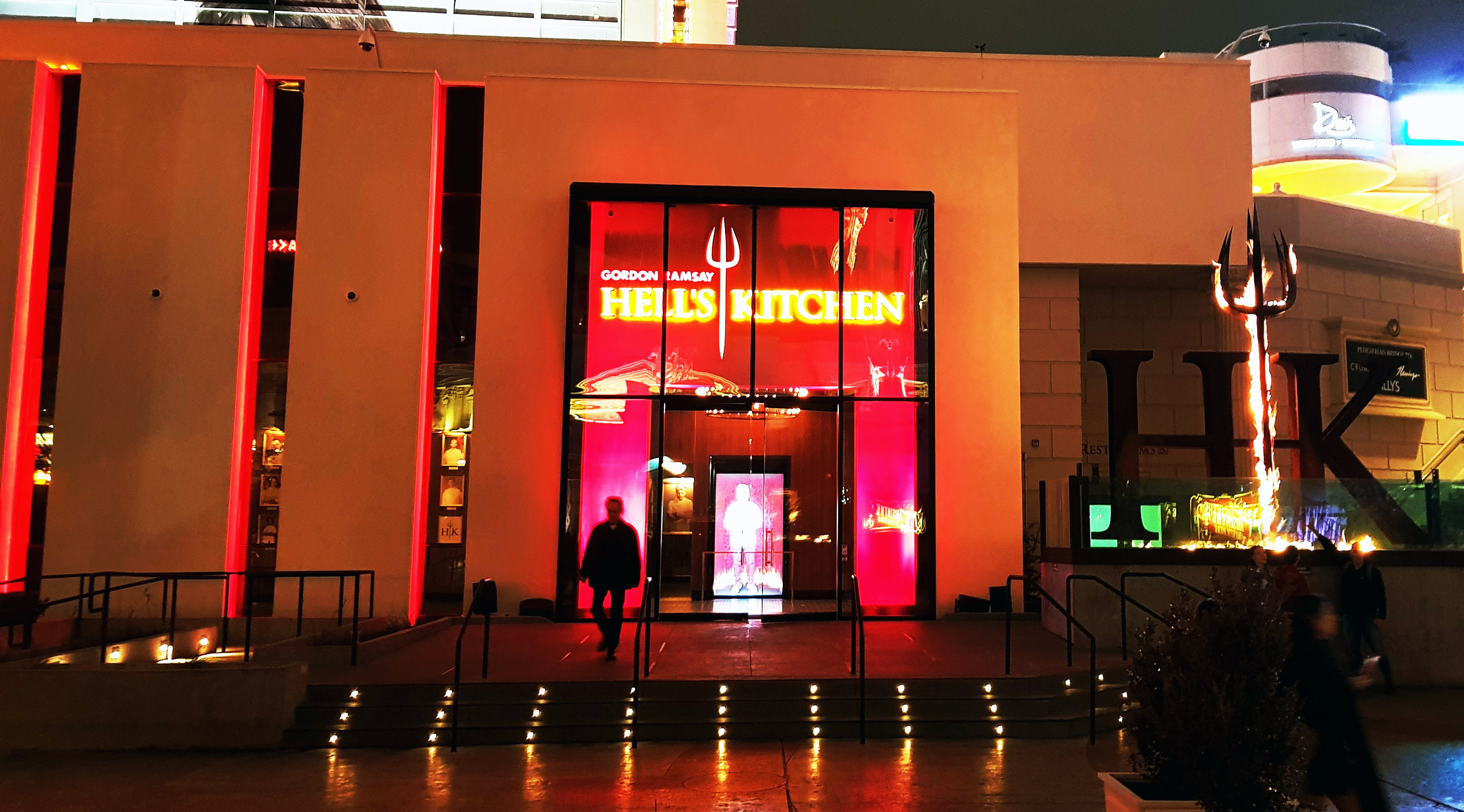
The main entrance to Hell's Kitchen

Ramsay was featured in the 2005 reality TV program Hell's Kitchen in the United States, and in 2018 launched a chain of theme restaurants inspired by the show.

The American-based restaurants are operated by the Gordon Ramsay North America (GRNA) division, which is headquartered in the Dallas–Fort Worth metroplex. The U.S. locations are Las Vegas, Lake Tahoe, Southern California, Atlantic City, Washington, D.C, Foxwoods, and Miami. A location in Chicago has been announced. Another location is scheduled to open in early 2026 at the River Cree Casino at Enoch Cree Nation, a First Nations community located just west of Edmonton, Alberta.

In November 2018, the second location of the chain opened at Caesars Palace Bluewaters in Dubai. It accommodated 260 diners with indoor and outdoor seating, and was operated by the Europe-based Gordon Ramsay Restaurant group. It closed in November 2023, when Caesars exited Dubai.

=== Television show tie-ins ===
The restaurants feature design elements from the television show, such as the HK logo and pitchfork door handles, and branded merchandise is available. Much of the menu is made up of dishes that are staples of the TV show's menu, such as pan-seared scallops, lobster risotto, and beef wellington. Cocktail names also refer to the show.

The 19th and 20th seasons of Hell's Kitchen were filmed at the Caesars Entertainment Studios property near the Las Vegas Strip, but for some scenes in those episodes the contestants visited the restaurant in Vegas.

Season 10 winner Christina Wilson, who later returned to the show as a sous-chef in 2016 and from 2018 to 2023, has helped to open various locations of the restaurant.

In an August 2022 interview with the San Diego Union-Tribune, Ramsay spoke of how the menu at his Hell's Kitchen restaurants was based on the television program, utilizing "what’s stayed on the menu for the past 21 seasons to test the contestants on the series"; he added, "It’s clear that some dishes have become TV favorites, which are easily adaptable to the restaurant." When the newspaper asked him, "How will dining at Hell’s Kitchen be different from what people see on the TV show?", Ramsay replied, "To start, you’re guaranteed to get fed!"

Television tie-in dishes
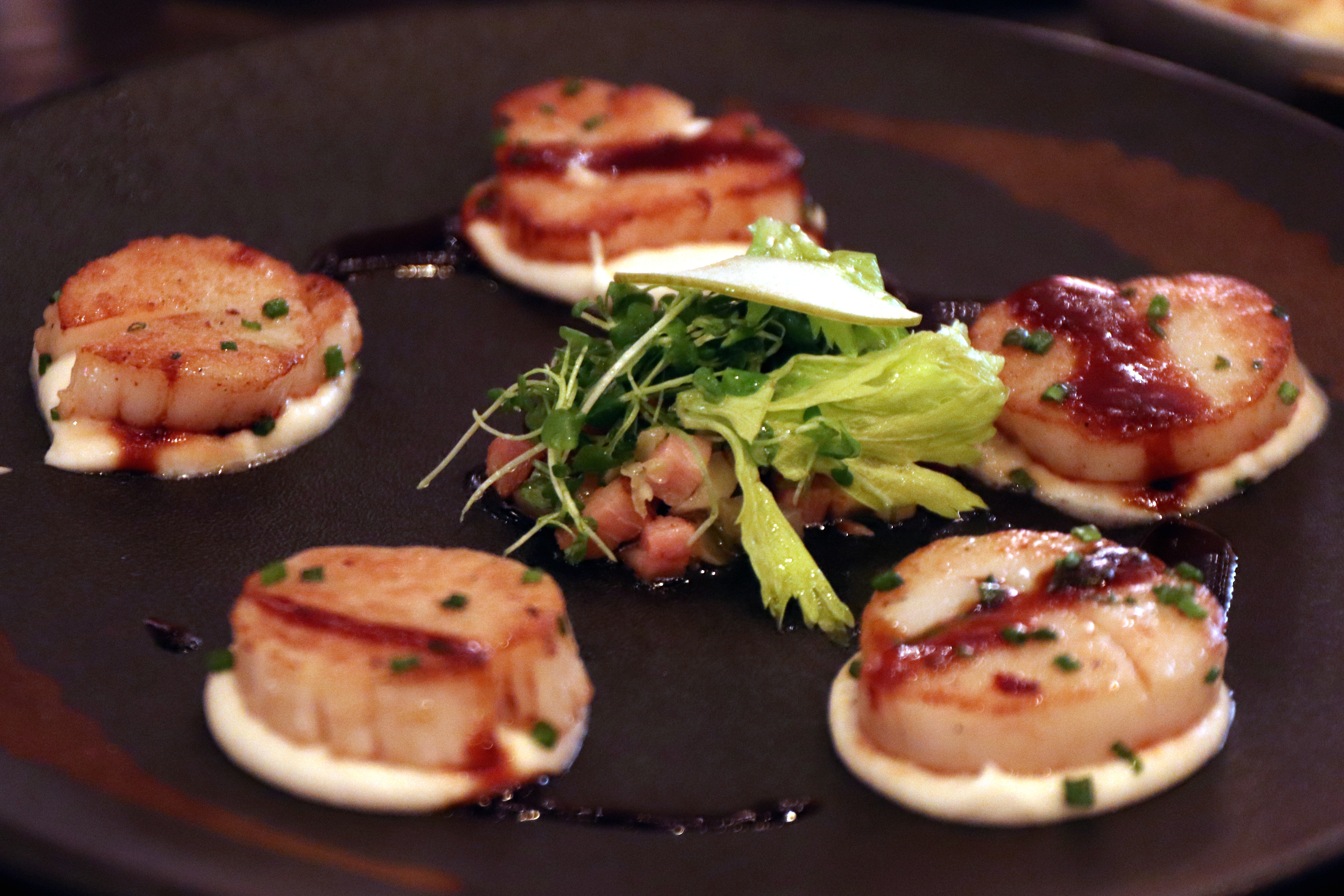
Pan seared scallops

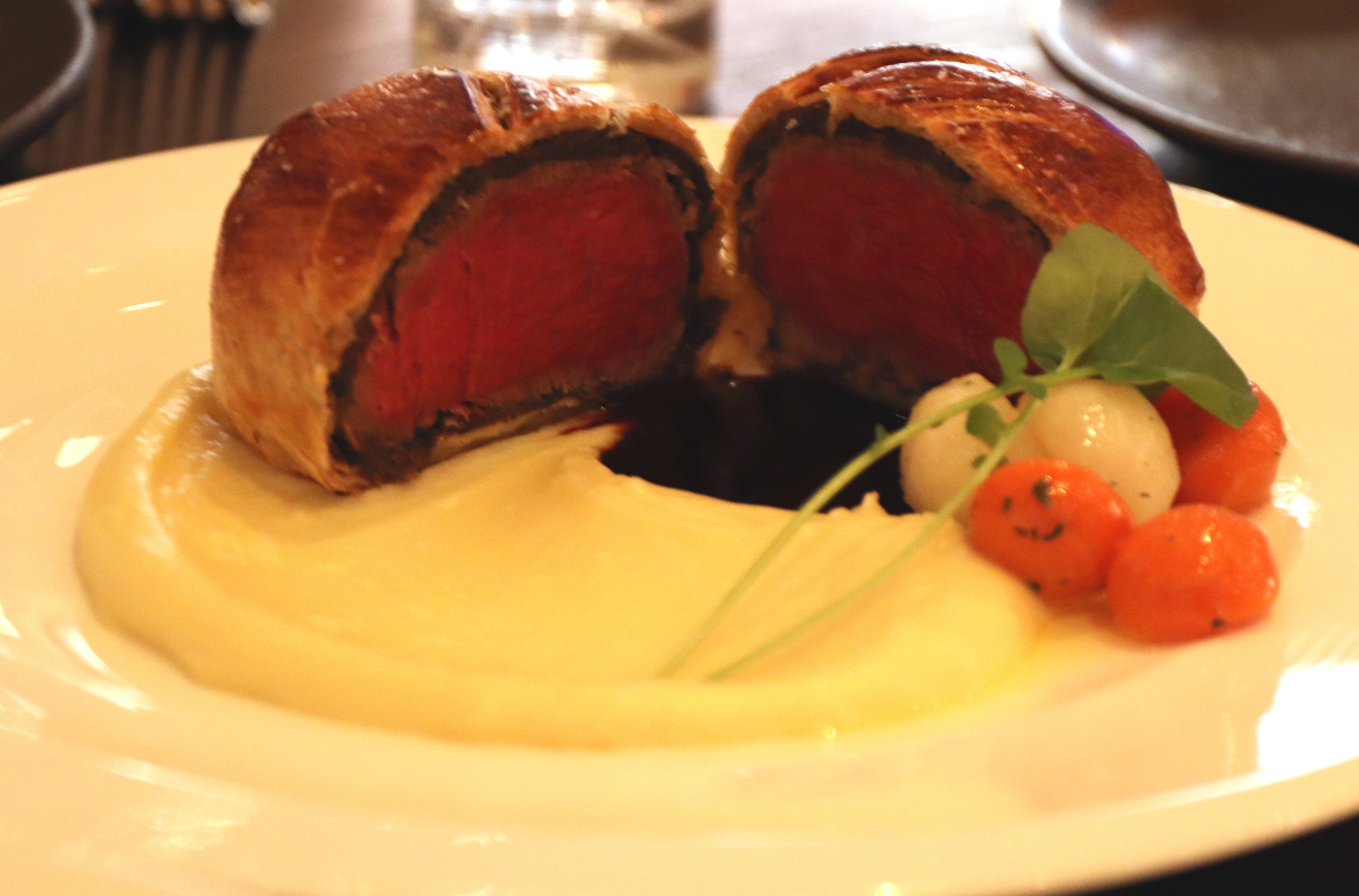
Beef Wellington

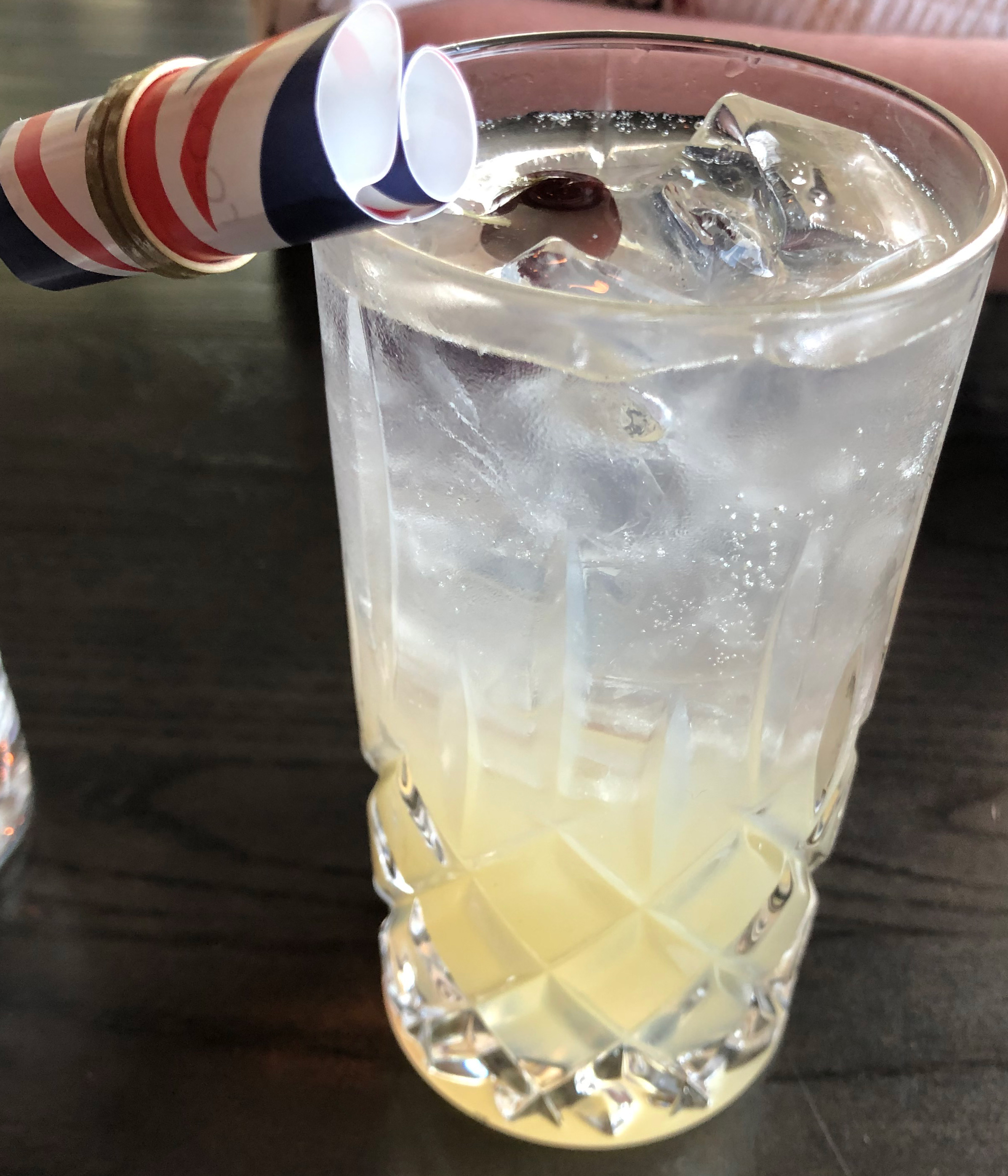
"Notes From Gordon" cocktail, with various insults from Ramsay

== Reception ==
In a rundown of Las Vegas restaurants for the Toronto Sun, Rita DeMontis wrote, "I found the whole Hell’s Kitchen experience exhilarating—from service to the various dishes to an eye-popping dessert...Awesome seating gives you a bird’s eye-view of the strip." In her list of Las Vegas's "30 best restaurants" for Tasting Table, Allie Lebos wrote, "the experience does not disappoint—as long as you're not expecting a meal filled with chaos and insults". The Gayot Guidebooks website gives the Hell's Kitchen on the Las Vegas Strip a rating of 13 points out of 20 ("Good"). Washington Post food critic Tom Siestsema described the D.C. location's environment as "high camp" with a very loud and smothering atmosphere, but enjoyed much of the food regardless, saying that it's "better than it needs to be."

== See also ==
- Christina Wilson
- List of restaurants owned or operated by Gordon Ramsay
- Lists of restaurants
