= Hong Kong Trams Station =

Tram-themed shop in Hong Kong

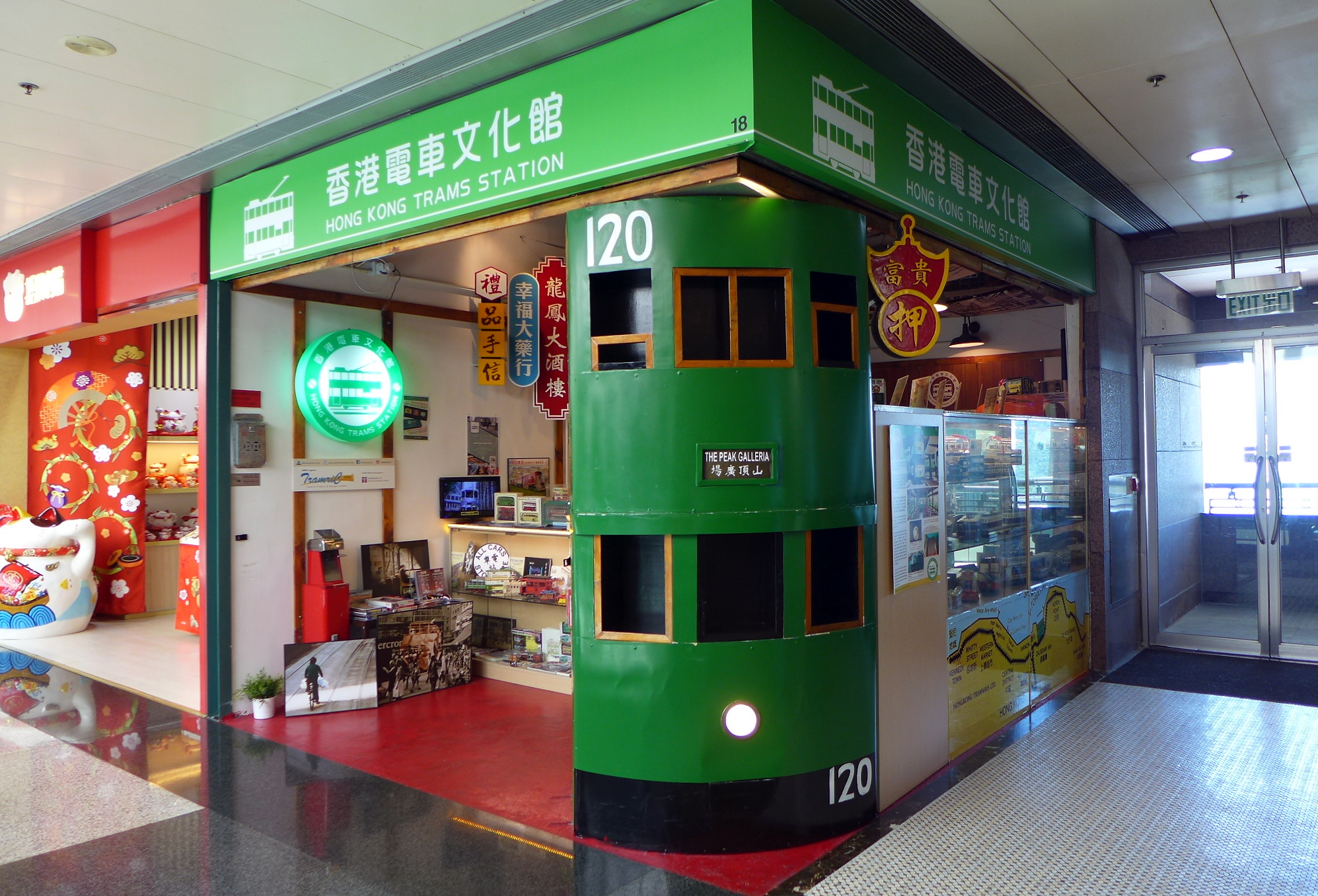
- Established: 27 October 2013; 13 years ago
- Location: Shop 229, 2/F, Siu Sai Wan Plaza, 10 Siu Sai Wan Road
- Coordinates: 22.27047°N 114.15005°E
- Type: Tram cafe and gift shop
- Curator: Eric Lee
- Website: https://www.facebook.com/hktramstore/

Hong Kong Trams Station
- Traditional Chinese: 香港電車文化館
- Simplified Chinese: 香港电车文化馆
Transcriptions
Standard Mandarin
- Hanyu Pinyin: Xiānggǎng Diànchē Wénhuà Guǎn
Yue: Cantonese
- Yale Romanization: Hēung góng dihn chē màhn fa gún
- Jyutping: Hoeng^{1}gong^{2}din^{6}ce^{1}man^{4}faa^{3}gun^{2}

Hong Kong Trams Station (Chinese: 香港電車文化館) is a tram cafe and gift shop in Siu Sai Wan. It was formerly located at the Peak Galleria on Hong Kong Island. The cafe, run by Tramric Limited, opened on 27 October 2013 to celebrate the 110th anniversary of Hong Kong Tramways.

The museum claimed to be the city's first tram-themed exhibition gallery, which explored the history of the tram system and its vehicles. Historical tram items on display included a 1970s money collector, tram tickets, and iron-made tram models. A reconstructed 1950s tram scene with a wooden tram seat was also present. Lectures, model-making workshops, tram tours, and exhibition gallery talks were also offered by the museum.

In May 2018, the Peak Galleria owner Hang Lung Properties informed the museum that the contract at their location would be terminated on 1 September 2018, and that rent would increase threefold. As a result, the museum closed on 26 August 2018. New branches have since been launched in Siu Sai Wan and Central Market.

== See also ==
- Hong Kong Railway Museum
