= Maze Grill Royal Hospital Road =

Maze Grill
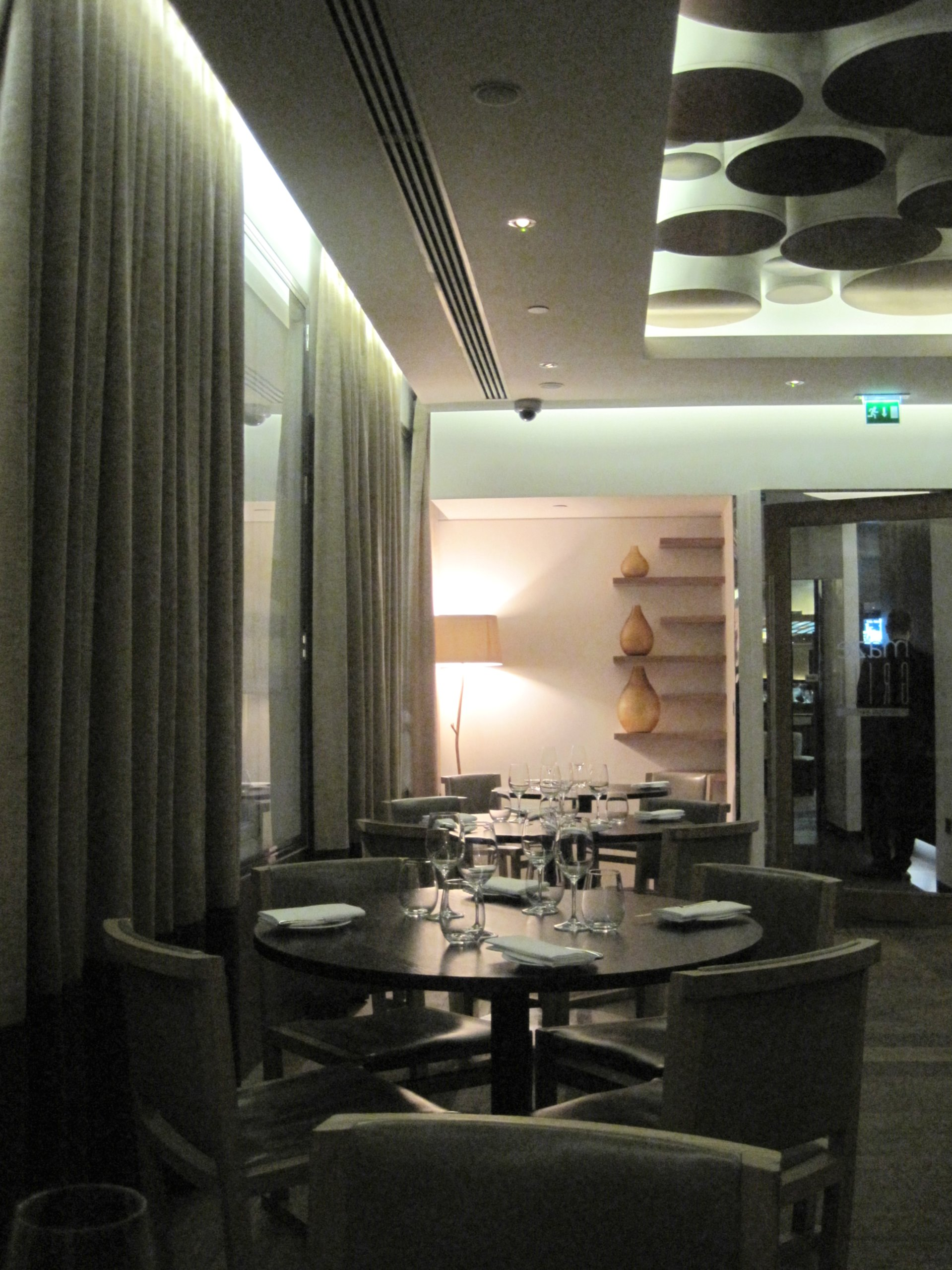
- Interactive map of Maze Grill

Restaurant information
- Established: 1980 (as Foxtrot Oscar); May 2015 (as Maze Grill)
- Owner: Gordon Ramsay
- Location: 79 Royal Hospital Road, Chelsea, London, SW3 4HN, United Kingdom
- Coordinates: 51°29′09″N 0°09′41″W
- Reservations: Yes
- Website: Official website

Maze Grill Royal Hospital Road (stylised as maze Grill Royal Hospital Road and formerly Foxtrot Oscar) is a restaurant in Chelsea, London, England owned by celebrity chef and restaurateur Gordon Ramsay.

== History ==
Foxtrot Oscar was founded in 1980 by Michael Proudlock. After running into financial difficulties, he sold the business to Gordon Ramsay but subsequently reacquired it in 2007. After refurbishment, the restaurant was reopened on 21 January 2008 by Gordon Ramsay Holdings (GRH).

== See also ==
- List of restaurants owned or operated by Gordon Ramsay
