= St Augustine Watling Street =

Coordinates: 51°30′48.52″N 00°05′49.00″W

St Augustine, Watling Street
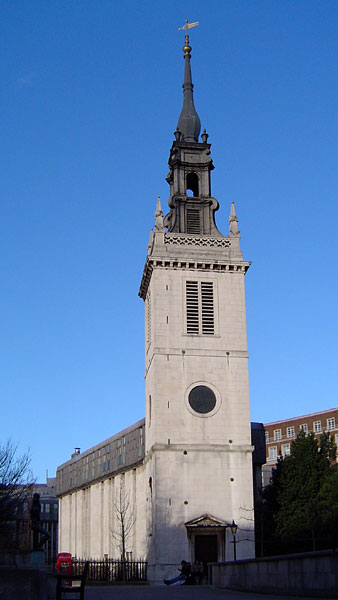
- Photo of the site in 2004
- St Augustine, Watling Street
- OS grid reference: TQ 32150 81110
- Location: London
- Country: England
- Denomination: Anglican

Architecture
- Demolished: 1941

St Augustine, Watling Street, was an Anglican church which stood just to the east of St Paul's Cathedral in the City of London. First recorded in the 12th century, it was destroyed by the Great Fire of London in 1666 and rebuilt to the designs of Christopher Wren. This building was largely destroyed by bombing during the Second World War, and its tower now forms part of St Paul's Cathedral Choir School.

== History ==
=== Medieval church ===
The church stood on the north side of Watling Street, at the corner with Old Change. According to Richard Newcourt, the dedication was to St Augustine of Canterbury, rather than St Augustine of Hippo. The earliest recorded mentioned of the church is from 1148. In 1252–3 Alexander le Cordwaner made a grant of land on the north side for its enlargement. John Stow, writing at the end of the 16th century called St Augustine's " a fair church," adding that it had been "lately well repaired." The church was partly rebuilt, and "in every part of it richly and very worthily beautified" in 1630–1, at a cost to the parishioners of £1,200. The foundations of the northern half of the medieval church were revealed when burials were removed in 1965. The archaeological evidence indicated that the 12th-century church was about 61 feet (19 m) long, the thirteenth century extension 59 feet (18 m) long and 16 feet (4.9 m) wide.

The medieval building was destroyed in the Great Fire of London in 1666.

=== Rebuilding after the fire ===
After the fire the parish was united with that of St Faith's, whose congregation had previously worshipped in the crypt of St Paul's Cathedral. St Augustine's was rebuilt to a design by Christopher Wren; the foundations, revealed by the excavations of 1965, were mostly of re-used stones set in mortar. The new church opened in September, 1683, but the steeple was not finished until 1695.

The interior was about 51 feet (16 m) long – shorter than the medieval building – 45 feet (14 m) wide and 30 feet (9.1 m) high. The nave was divided from the aisles by an arcade supported on Corinthian columns with unusually high bases. The naves and aisles were barrel vaulted, the nave vault being pierced by three skylights on each side. There were galleries on the north side, and at the west end, but the latter was taken down when the organ was moved to the south side. The walls were originally panelled to a height of 8 feet (2.4 m), but this was later considerably reduced. The reredos had Corinthian columns and the pulpit was of carved oak. The pulpit was modernised by Arthur Blomfield in 1878.

Rectors of the church included John Douglas, later Bishop of Carlisle and of Salisbury, from 1764 to 1787, and Richard Harris Barham, author of the Ingoldsby Legends, from 1842 until his death in 1845.

=== Destruction ===
The church was destroyed by bombing in 1941. It was not rebuilt, but the tower was restored in 1954 and later incorporated into a new choir school for St Paul's Cathedral, completed in 1967.

The remains of the church were designated a Grade I listed building on 4 January 1950.

== Faith, the church cat ==
The church cat, named Faith, became quite well known after the air raid which destroyed St Augustine's in the Second World War.

In 1936 Faith, a stray cat, turned up at St Augustine's church. Although being turned out three times by Father Henry Ross, eventually Faith was allowed to stay. Nobody claimed her so she stayed, attending Sunday services and hunting mice.

Days before the bomb attack on the church she was seen moving her black and white kitten, Panda, to the cellar. Despite being brought back several times, Faith insisted on returning Panda to her refuge.

On the morning after the air raid the rector searched through the dangerous ruins for the missing animals, and eventually found Faith, surrounded by smouldering rubble and debris but still guarding the kitten in the spot she had selected three days earlier. The story of her premonition and rescue eventually reached Maria Dickin, founder of the People's Dispensary for Sick Animals, and for her courage and devotion Faith was awarded a specially-made silver medal. Her death in 1948 was reported on four continents.

Faith is buried in the churchyard of St Paul's Choir School. A stone marker stands over her grave with the words, "Faith the cat who defied the London Blitz".

== See also ==
- List of Christopher Wren churches in London
- List of churches rebuilt after the Great Fire but since demolished
