= Bread Street Kitchen, Singapore =

Bread Street Kitchen
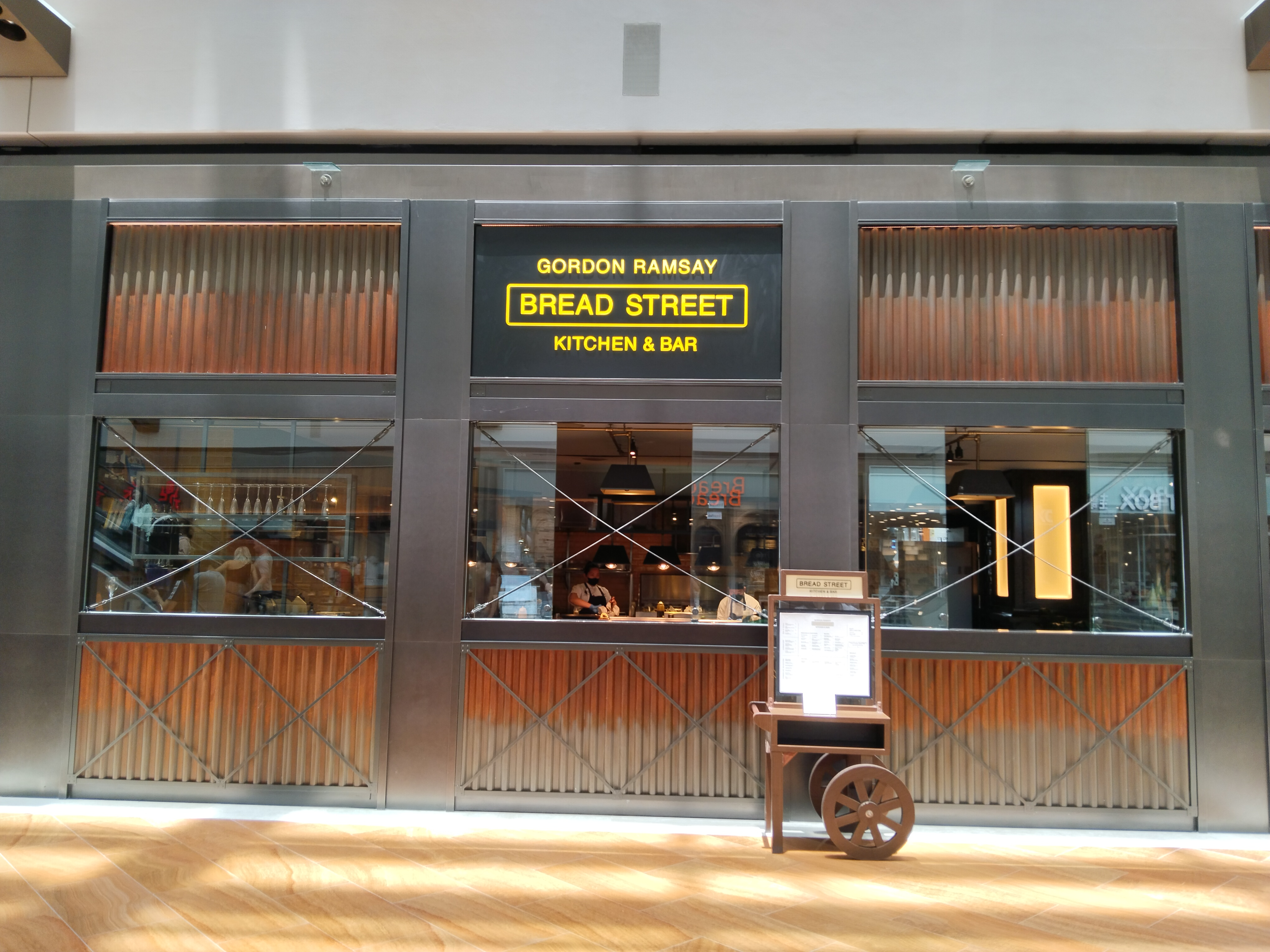
- Bread Street Kitchen in 2024
- Interactive map of Bread Street Kitchen

Restaurant information
- Established: 23 June 2015
- Owner: Gordon Ramsay
- Head chef: Sabrina Stillhart
- Food type: British/European cuisine
- Location: The Shoppes at Marina Bay Sands, 01-81, 2 Bayfront Avenue, Singapore
- Coordinates: 1.282643°N 103.85762°E
- Seating capacity: 149
- Website: Official website

Bread Street Kitchen is a restaurant owned by celebrity chef and restaurateur Gordon Ramsay. Located in Singapore and modelled after the original Bread Street Kitchen in the United Kingdom, the restaurant was opened in June 2015.

== History and description ==
Modelled after the original restaurant in the United Kingdom, Bread Street Kitchen opened on 23 June 2015 and was Gordon Ramsay's first restaurant in Singapore as well as his second Asian venture. It is located at the first floor of The Shoppes at Marina Bay Sands. The restaurant has a seating capacity of 149, and its interiors were designed by Wilson Associates’ Blueplate Studio. The menu was developed by head chef Sabrina Stillhart and predominantly offers British cuisine with a few "Asian inspirations".

== Reception ==
Singaporean food critic Wong Ah Yoke visited Bread Street Kitchen twice and "left the table with mixed feelings" on both occasions. In a review for The Straits Times, he remarked that "there are better celebrity-chef restaurants at Marina Bay Sands to dine at" and awarded the food – which he described as "pedestrian fare" – a score of 2.5 out of 5. Karen Fong of Lifestyle Asia offered a more positive review, and wrote that her experience at Bread Street Kitchen was "extremely satisfying". Business Times reviewer Jaime Ee rated her two visits to Bread Street Kitchen as "promising" and commented that "getting a good meal ... is a game of chance".

== See also ==
- List of restaurants owned or operated by Gordon Ramsay
- Singaporean cuisine
