= Bread Street Kitchen and Bar, Hong Kong =

Bread Street Kitchen
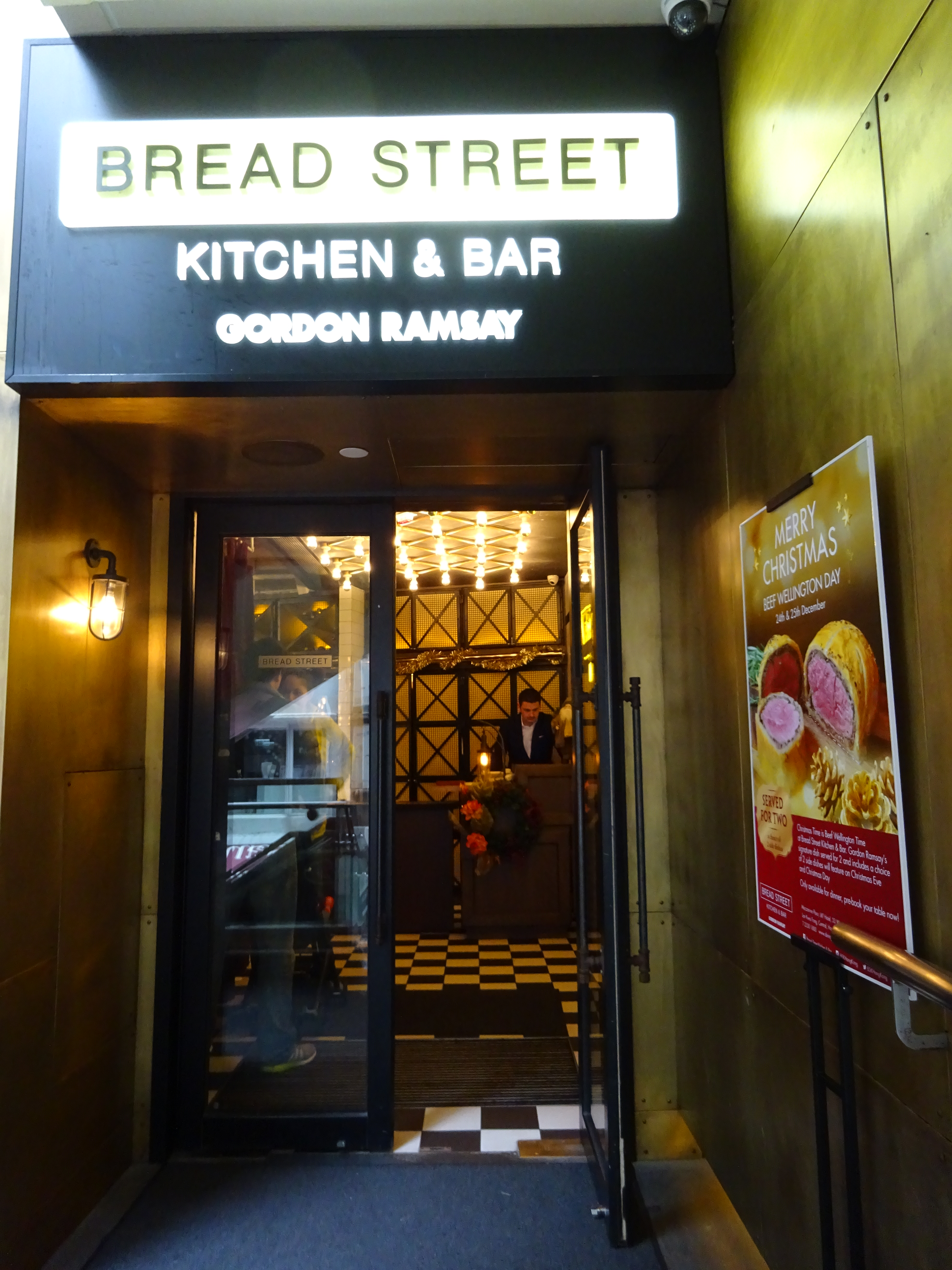
- Bread Street Kitchen and Bar at its former location in Lan Kwai Fong, Hong Kong.

Restaurant information
- Established: 18 September 2014
- Closed: 1 April 2020
- Owners: Gordon Ramsay; Dining Concepts
- Food type: British/European cuisine
- Location: Shop G02, G/F, The Peak Galleria, 118 Peak Road, Hong Kong
- Seating capacity: 164
- Other locations: Dubai, London, Sanya, Singapore
- Website: Official website

Bread Street Kitchen and Bar was a restaurant and bar located at Shop G02, G/F, The Peak Galleria, 118 Peak Road, Hong Kong, operated by Gordon Ramsay.

== Lan Kwai Fong ==
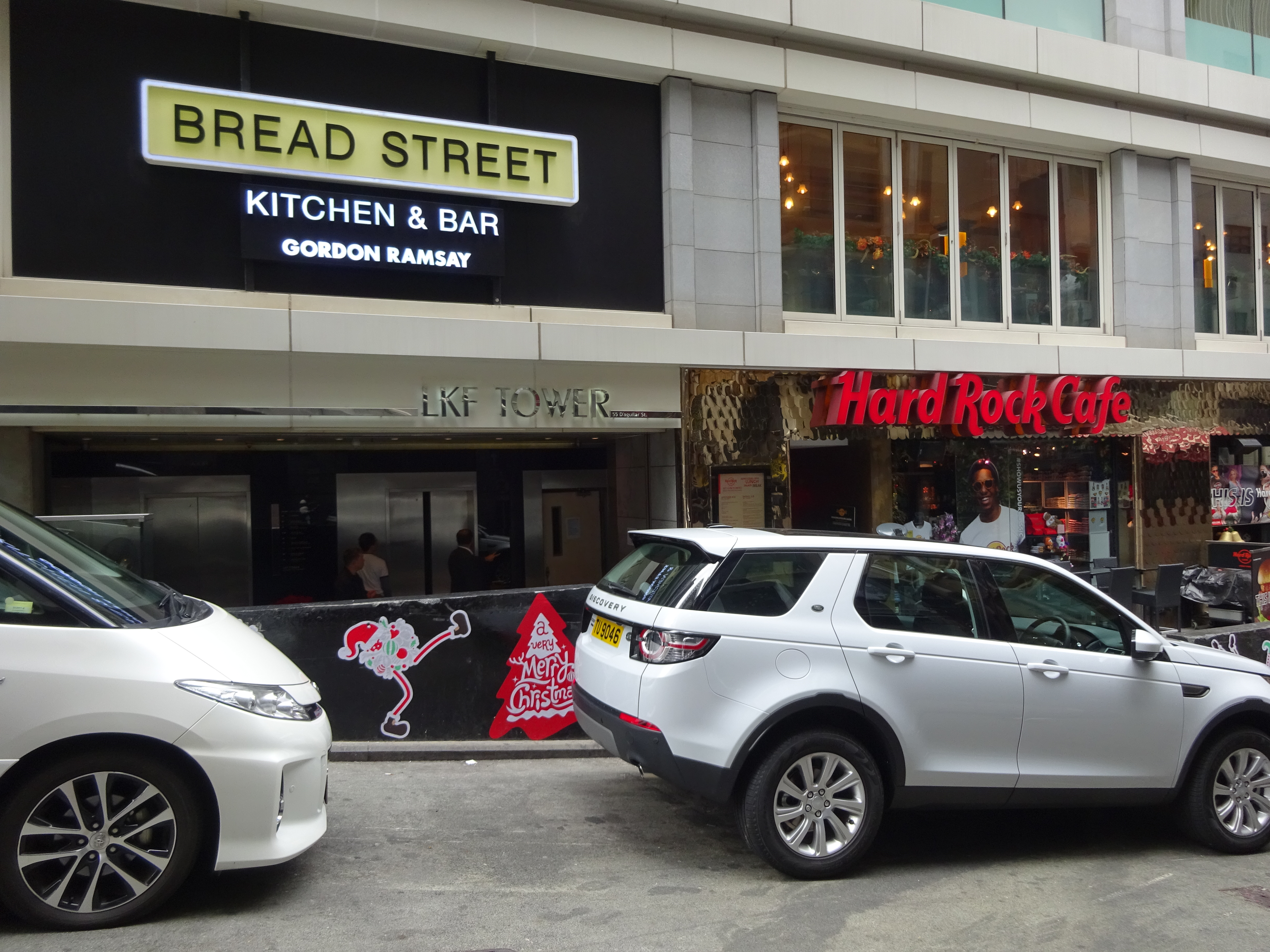
External view of Bread Street Kitchen and Bar at its former location in Lan Kwai Fong, Hong Kong.

The restaurant was owned by Gordon Ramsay's Hong Kong partner, Dining Concepts. It first opened in the Lan Kwai Fong Hotel in Lan Kwai Fong in 2014 with Gilles Bosquet as the head chef, but the hotel closed in 2017 and was redeveloped into offices, so the restaurant relocated to The Peak Galleria.

== The Peak Galleria ==
The restaurant moved to its final location in February 2019 with Gareth Packham as head chef before he moved to Gordon Ramsay's new restaurant Maze Grill at Harbour City.

Its signature dishes include fish & chips, shepherd's pie, beef wellington, tamarind spiced chicken fillets, fried buffalo chicken burger, pesto and spinach flatbread, the melted chocolate fondant capped off with mint chocolate chip ice cream and sticky toffee pudding.

== Closure ==
Due to the 2019–2020 Hong Kong protests and COVID-19 pandemic, Gordon Ramsay shut three of his restaurants in Hong Kong on 1 April 2020, including Bread Street Kitchen & Bar. The other restaurants closed, both in Tsim Sha Tsui, were London House and Maze Grill. He retains one restaurant in Hong Kong International Airport, Plane Food To Go, which opened in early 2019 in partnership with SSP Group.
