= One New Change =

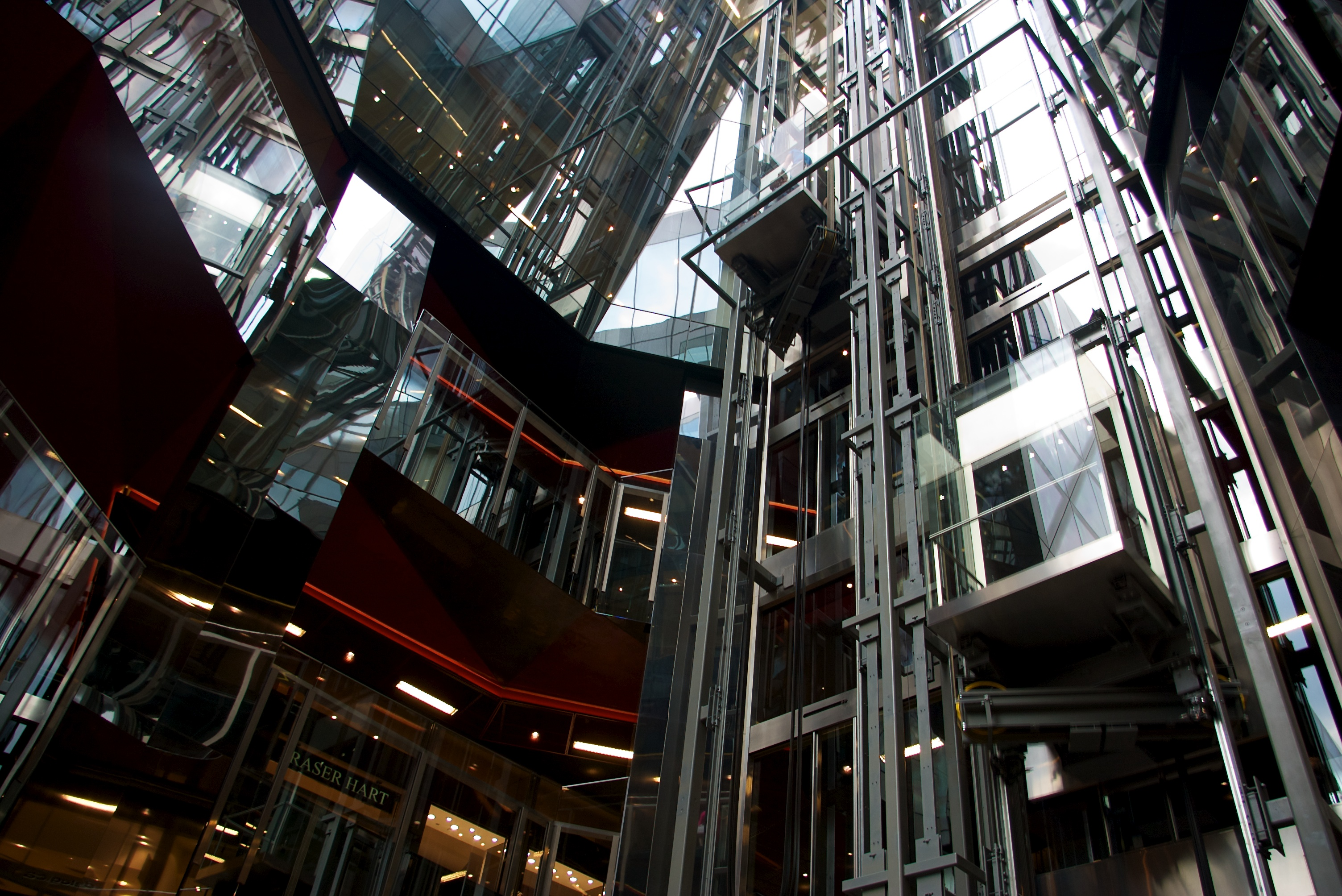
- The central lifts of the shopping centre, pictured in 2011
- Location: London, United Kingdom
- Coordinates: 51.5137°N 0.0958°W
- Address: 1 New Change
- Opened: 28 October 2010; 16 years ago
- Developer: Land Securities
- Owner: Land Securities
- Num. of stores: 60
- Floor area: 220,000 sq ft (20,000 m^{2})
- Parking: None
- Public transit: St Paul's
- Website: onenewchange.com

One New Change is a major office and retail development in the City of London. It comprises 560,000 square feet (52,000 m^{2}) of floor space, including 220,000 square feet (20,000 m^{2}) of retail space and 330,000 square feet (31,000 m^{2}) of office space and is the only large shopping centre in the City of London, the historic nucleus and modern financial centre of London. It cost £500 million to build and was completed in October 2010.

The complex is located on New Change, a road linking Cannon Street with Cheapside, in one of the areas of the City historically associated with retailing and markets. It is close to St Paul's Cathedral. The nearest London Underground stations are St Paul's and Mansion House.

== History and background ==
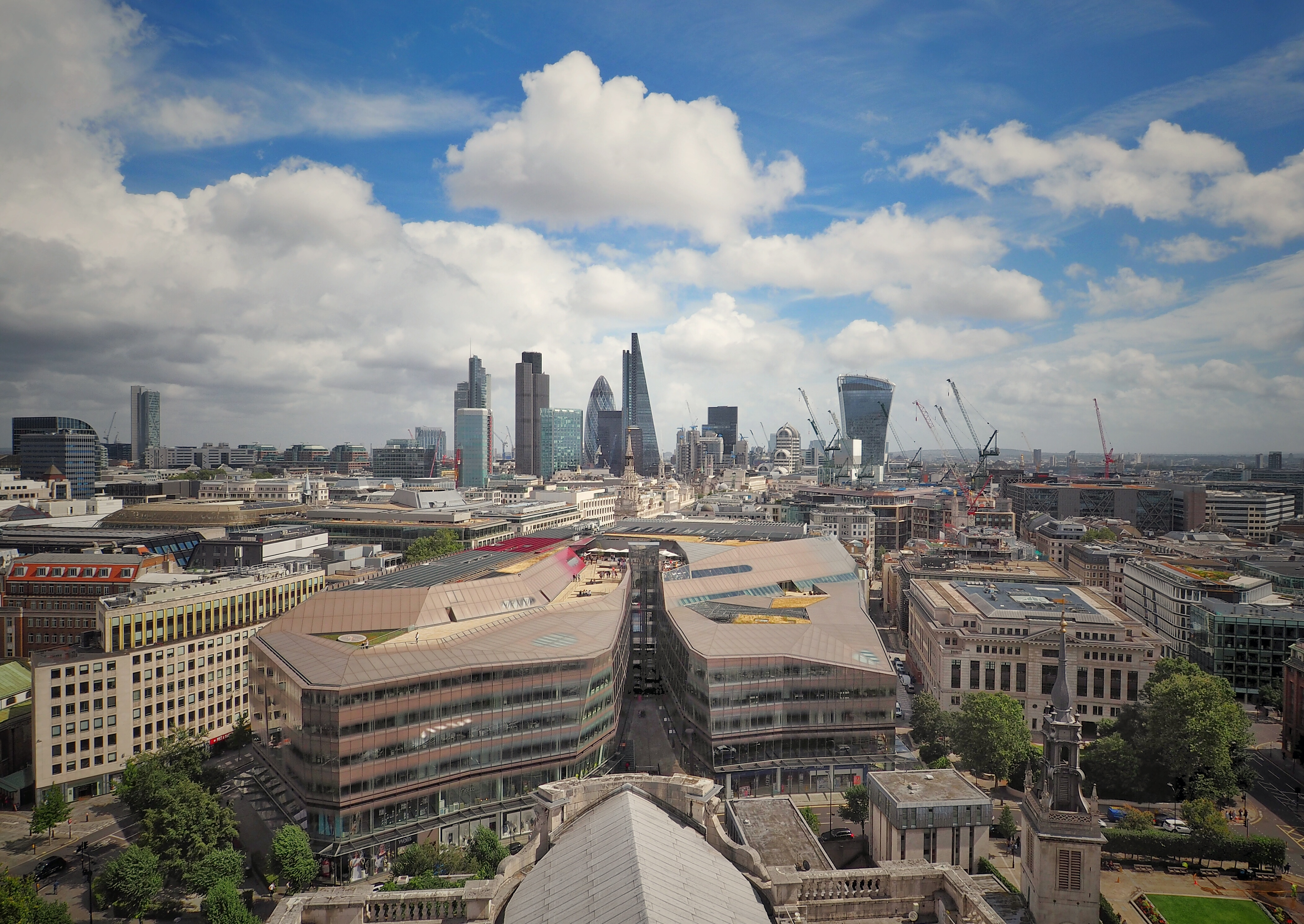
One New Change, as viewed from St Paul's Cathedral

The development's sensitive location – opposite St Paul's Cathedral – and its modern architecture led to some controversy during its planning and construction, including criticism from King Charles III, the then Prince of Wales. The French architect Jean Nouvel and the developer was Land Securities. The new eight-storey, 34 m high centre replaced an 11-storey, 40 m building constructed in the 1950s for the Bank of England, which was demolished in 2007. The complex's distinctive appearance has given it the nickname "the stealth bomber".

One New Change opened its doors to the public at midday on 28 October 2010. The roof terrace, with its restaurant and cafe, was opened on 18 November 2010.

== Location ==
One New Change lies entirely within Bread Street ward. Its name derives from the road running between it and St Paul's, itself a post-War creation, replacing a much older street called Old Change. It is bounded by Cheapside to the north, Bread Street to the east, Watling Street to the south, and New Change to the west. Within the centre, the north–south arcade is called Cheapside Passage and the east–west arcade is New Change Passage.

The shopping centre is located in an area of London's historic nucleus that was widely known for its retail – 'Cheapside' being Old English for "market-place" – and many of the roads around One New Change are named after the produce once sold in the area, such as Poultry, Honey Lane, Milk Street and Bread Street.

St Paul's Cathedral dome from the roof terrace

== Design ==
The principal architect for the One New Change development was the French architect Jean Nouvel The development also features high-profile interiors by Tom Dixon for the on-site restaurant Barbecoa, which was replaced by Ivy Asia in November 2019.

== Tenants ==
Sixty shops and restaurants are located in One New Change, including a number of large high-street retailers. A barbecue restaurant and butcher called Barbecoa was a joint-venture by Jamie Oliver and Adam Perry-Lang. It was replaced by Ivy Asia in November 2019.

The shopping centre is open seven days a week, which is notable as in recent times most shops and restaurants in the City have been closed at the weekends. A Gordon Ramsay restaurant and bar named Bread Street Kitchen opened at One New Change in September 2011.

== Public art ==
The centre is the location of a 40-foot sculpture of a rusty nail simply called 'Nail' by artist Gavin Turk, officially unveiled in 2012. The Guardian's art critic Jonathan Jones described the sculpture as "modest and humorous", with Turk explaining that he saw it as "a nostalgic thing because I don't think there's a nail in that entire building." and "it hints at the empty space where what was nailed has long since been removed."
