= Bread Street Kitchen =

London restaurant owned by chef Gordon Ramsay

- The location of the restaurant within Greater London

Restaurant information
- Established: 26 October 2011; 14 years ago
- Chef: Gordon Ramsay
- Dress code: Casual dining
- Location: One New Change, 10 Bread Street, London EC4M 9AJ, United Kingdom
- Coordinates: 51.513570°N 0.095015°W
- Website: www.gordonramsayrestaurants.com/bread-street-kitchen

Bread Street Kitchen is a restaurant owned by chef Gordon Ramsay within the One New Change retail and office development in London.

== History ==
The restaurant cost £3 million, and the opening was delayed by a year and was subsequently expected to open on 26 September 2011. A week prior to that date, Gordon Ramsay posted on Twitter, "Holy Crap 1 week to go ! Not to sure if we are going to make it on time ,Tasting starts tomorrow YUM". It actually opened on 26 October, located near St Paul's Cathedral in London, inside the One New Change retail and office development across two floors. It is next door to one of Jamie Oliver's Barbecoa restaurants. The interior of the restaurant was fitted out by Russell Sage Studios using reclaimed materials and exposed concrete struts.

It was announced in June 2014 that Ramsay intended to replicate Bread Street Kitchen in a new restaurant in Hong Kong, due to open in the following September. On 23 June 2015 Gordon Ramsay officially opened Bread Street Kitchen in Singapore, at Marina Bay Sands, and in October 2015 opened Bread Street Kitchen in Atlantis, The Palm Dubai.

After spending three years in Lan Kwai Fong, Bread Street Kitchen Hong Kong has moved into a prime real-estate space atop The Peak at The Peak Galleria in February 2019.

== Menu ==
The restaurant is fitted out with an open kitchen, a raw bar and a wood-burning oven. It has a wine balcony storing 2000 bottles. Dishes on the menu include a burger made of beef short ribs, a mutton pie, as well as suckling pig.

== Reception ==
Food critic Jay Rayner visited the restaurant for The Observer in October 2011. He described it as "loud and brash", but enjoyed several dishes such as a sea bass with aubergine purée, and a veal chop which he thought could have been improved by resting it longer. But he thought that the tamarind chicken wings were overpriced and of poor quality, the burger on the menu was "overminced to a paste, destroying both flavour and texture". He noted the high profit margin for chicken wings approx grossing a 90% profit margin over the industry standard of 70%, and contrasted it to a person smelling of lynx and being a late adolescent in age. He felt that the restaurant might improve with time. Tracey MacLeod said that "nearly everything ... was good" in her review in The Independent. She liked the burger and suggested that that mutton pie was going to become the restaurant's signature dish, but found that her waitress was unfamiliar with the menu and the there were technical issues sending orders to the kitchen; summarising, she said that the restaurant whilst being "potentially fantastic" had no clue how to look after their customers and she would be unlikely to return.

The review in Metro gave the restaurant three out of five, but said that this was based on the interior and not the food. It said that the veal chop was "weirdly truncated and misshapen, as though it had a slab shaved off to appease the bottom line" and the crab tagliolini was "cat food". However, it did praise the chicken wings and the venison with sour cherries and celeriac purée.

Time Out magazine gave the restaurant a rating of four out of five, however Harden's restaurant guide gave it a score of four (where 1 is high and five is low) for food, ambience and service and said that it was "nothing special". Tanya Gold visited the restaurant nine months after it opened for The Spectator, saying that the service was fast and remarked positively about the food she tried.

== See also ==
- Bread Street Kitchen, Singapore
