= Old Change =

Former street in the City of London

Coordinates: 51.5134°N 0.0963°W

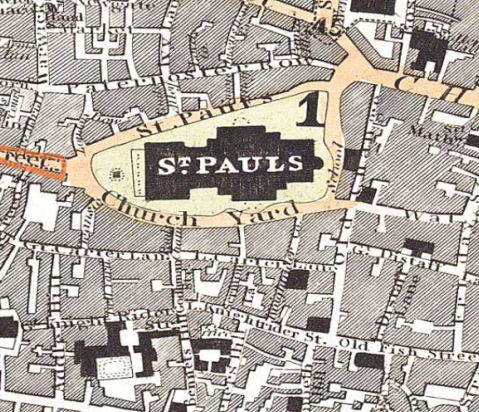
1830 map showing Old Change to the east of St Paul's Cathedral

Old Change was a street in the City of London, connecting Cheapside to Knightrider Street.

The street was originally known as Old Exchange. It was named after a building constructed in the 13th century for coining bullions, which is commemorated by a plaque in the gardens by St Paul's Cathedral. Edward Herbert, 1st Baron Herbert of Cherbury had a house with gardens adjacent to the street. The Church of St Augustine was on the corner of Old Change. It was rebuilt in the late 17th century by Christopher Wren following the Great Fire of London.

During the early 18th century, Old Change was inhabited by Armenian merchants who set up numerous silk and woollen warehouses.

Old Change was destroyed during World War II. A replacement street, New Change, was built slightly to the east of this following the war. The church tower was restored and is now Grade I listed.

== See also ==
- One New Change
