= The Peak Galleria =

Commercial building in Hong Kong

Peak Galleria
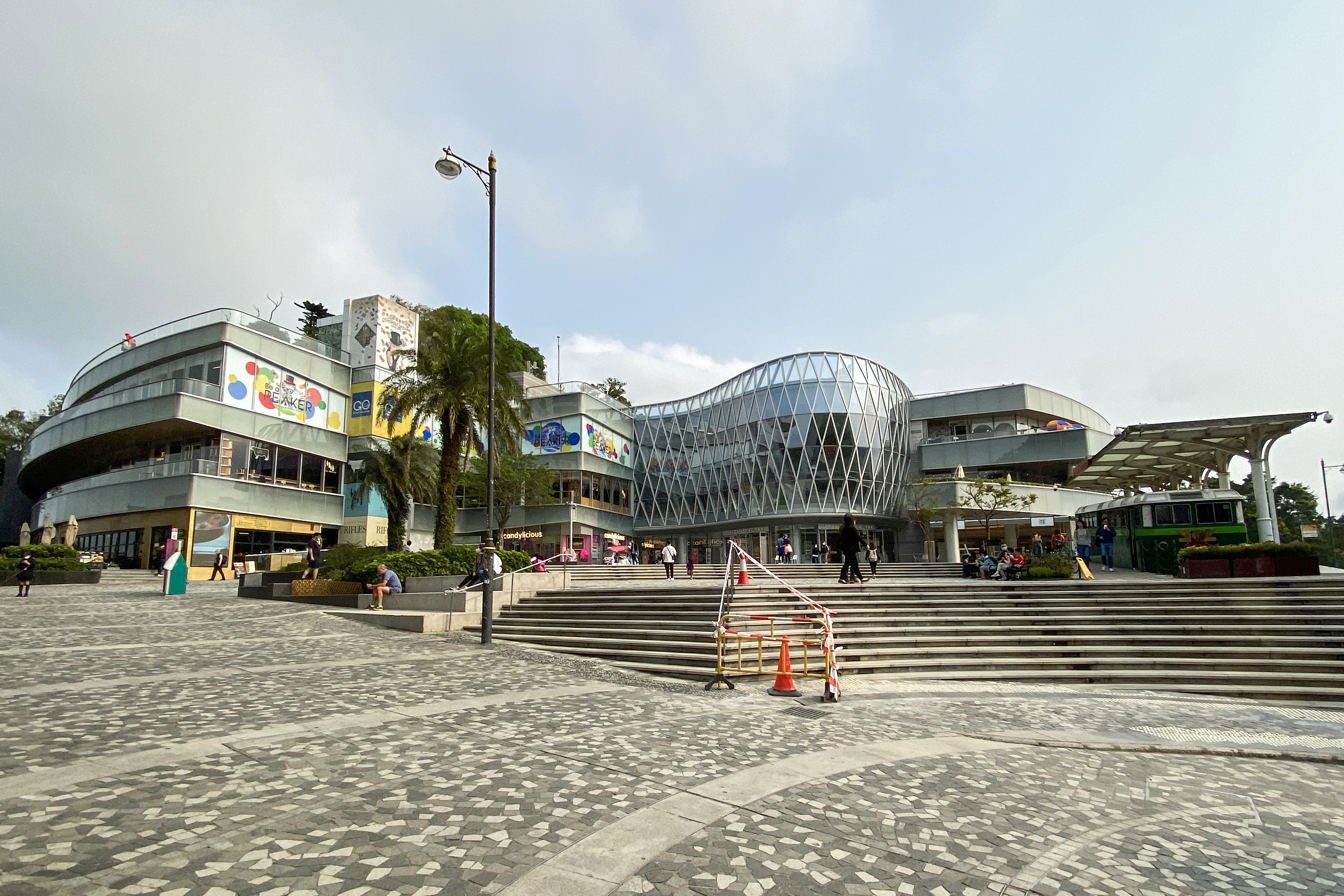
- The Peak Galleria after renovation in 2019
- Location: Victoria Gap, Hong Kong Island, Hong Kong
- Coordinates: 22.2703°N 114.1499°E
- Address: 118 Peak Road
- Opened: 5 February 1993; 33 years ago
- Owner: Hang Lung Properties
- Architect: aedas
- Floors: 4
- Parking: Y
- Public transit: Terminus for bus and minibus
- Website: thepeakgalleria.com/en

The Peak Galleria
- Traditional Chinese: 山頂廣場
- Simplified Chinese: 山顶广场
Transcriptions
Standard Mandarin
- Hanyu Pinyin: Shāndǐng Guǎngchǎng
Yue: Cantonese
- Jyutping: saan1 deng2 gwong2 coeng4

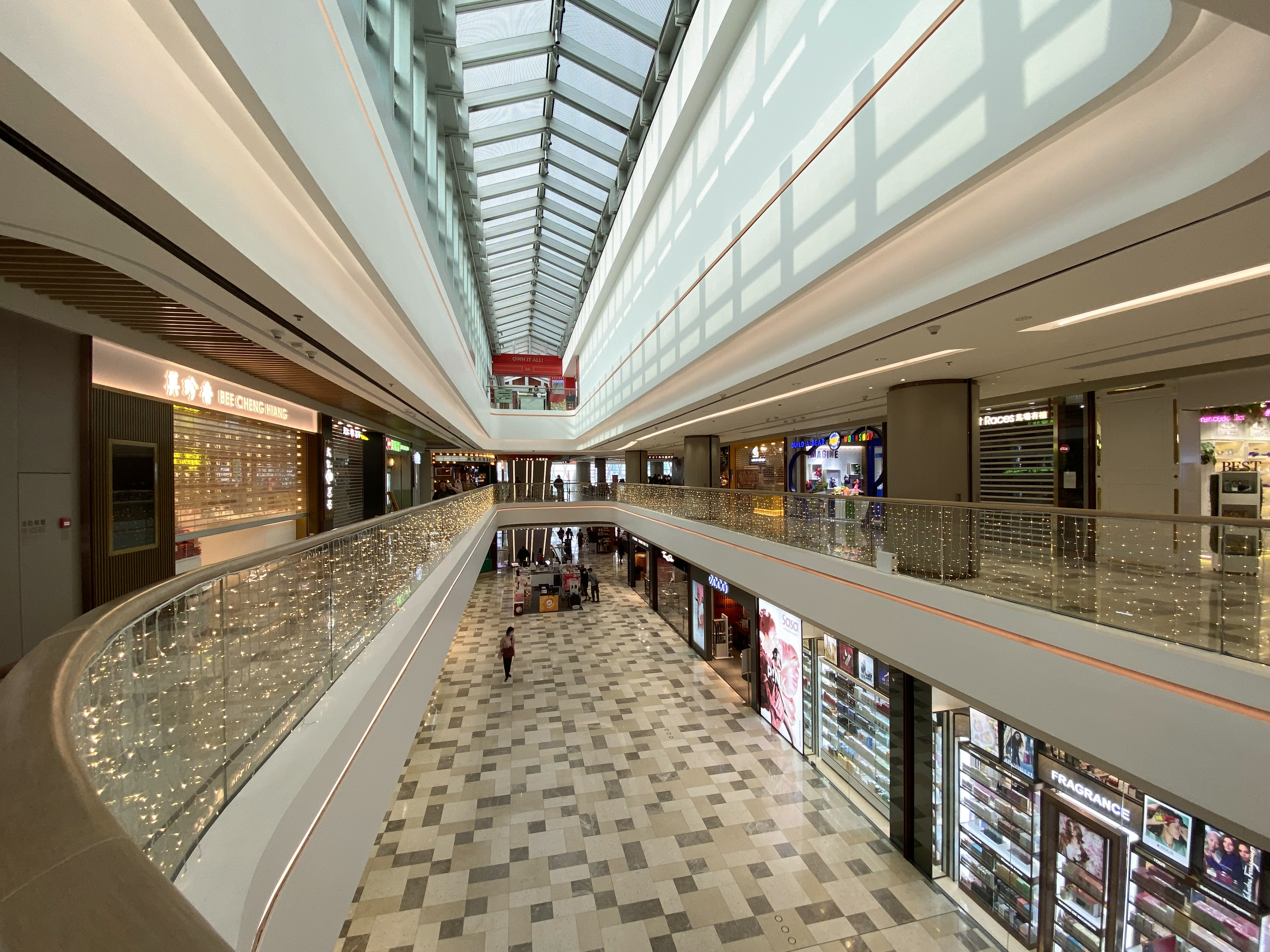
The Peak Galleria interior after renovation in 2020

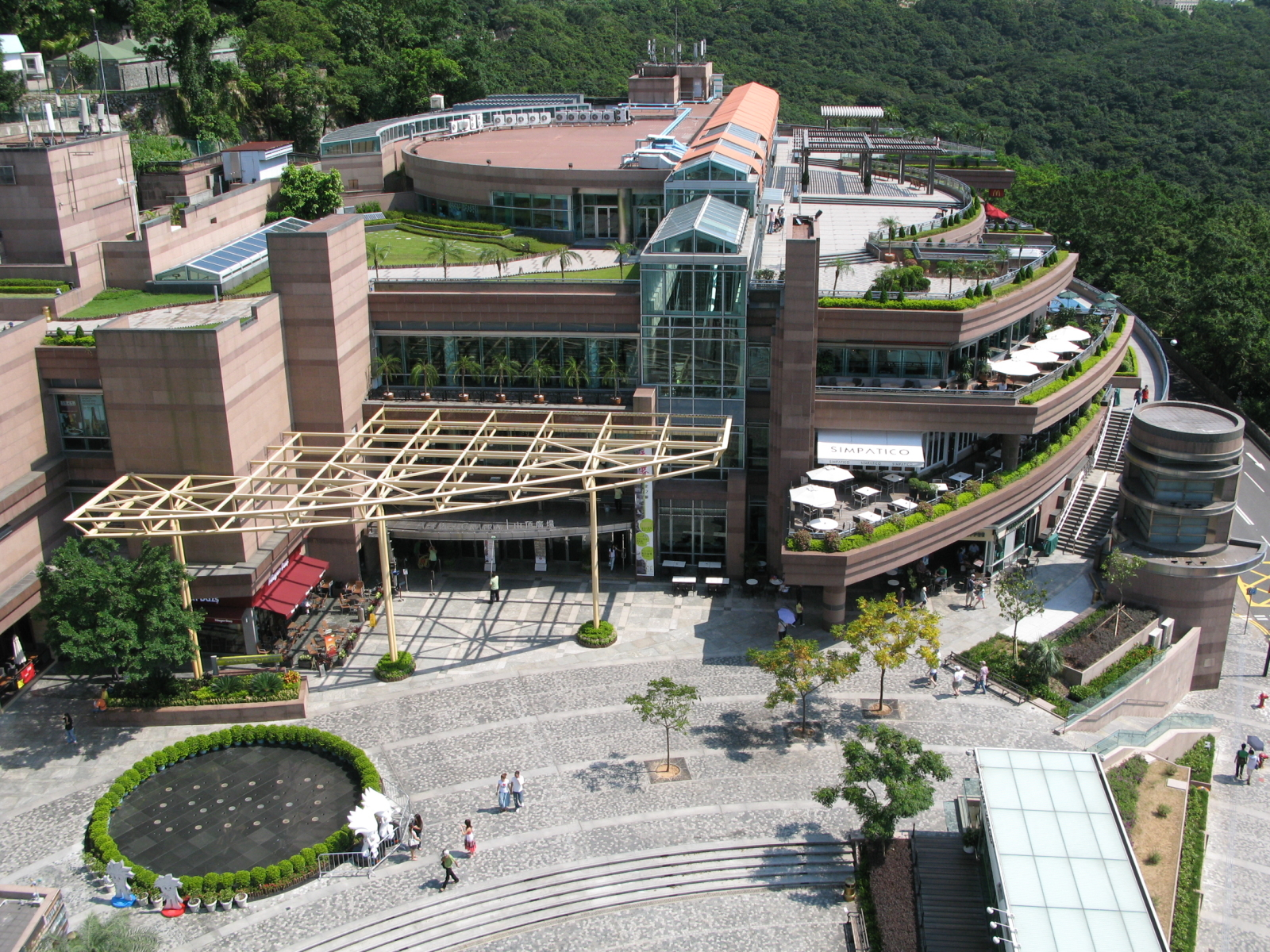
The Peak Galleria before renovation in 2017

Peak Galleria (Chinese: 山頂廣場; Jyutping: saan1 deng2 gwong2 coeng4) is a leisure and shopping complex and a tourist attraction located at Victoria Gap, near the summit of Victoria Peak on Hong Kong Island, Hong Kong. It is owned and run by Hang Lung Properties. It includes a bus terminus for public buses run by New World First Bus and a green minibus route that serves the Peak. The complex is adjacent to the Peak Tower, another leisure and shopping complex, which houses the upper terminus of the Peak Tram.

The shopping complex houses several eateries. It also has a free-entry observatory deck on level 3, larger than the Peak Tower one.

== History ==
The Galleria complex, located on the former site of The Peak Hotel, has been open since 1993.

From 2013 until its closure in 2018, Hong Kong Trams Station, a museum and gift shop focused on the history of Hong Kong Tramways, was located in the complex.

In 2016, Hang Lung Properties began renovations and the restaurant Café Deco, which had been located in the mall for 22 years, was closed.

In 2019, Hang Lung Properties renovated the entrance of the mall.

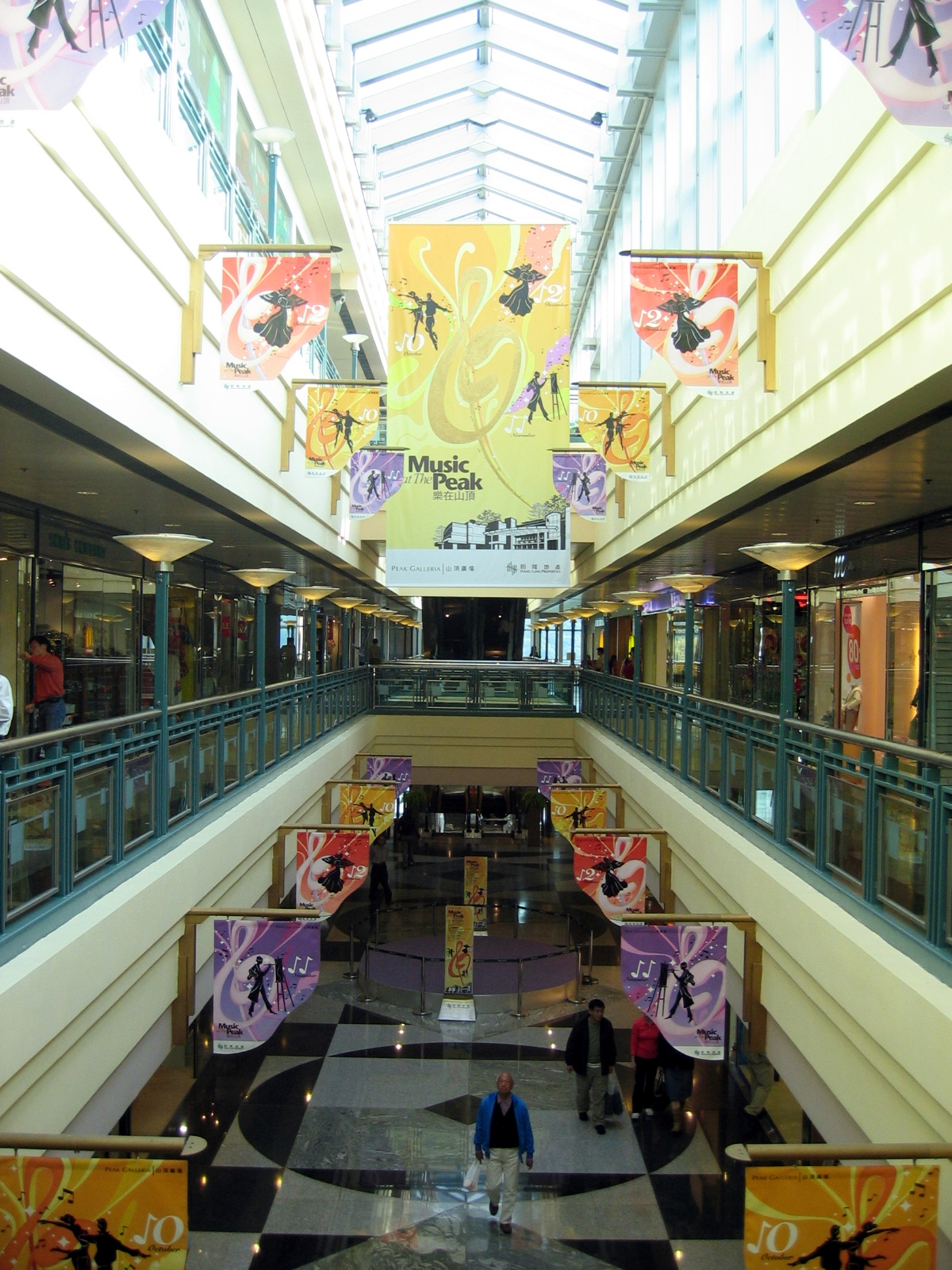
Atrium, before renovation

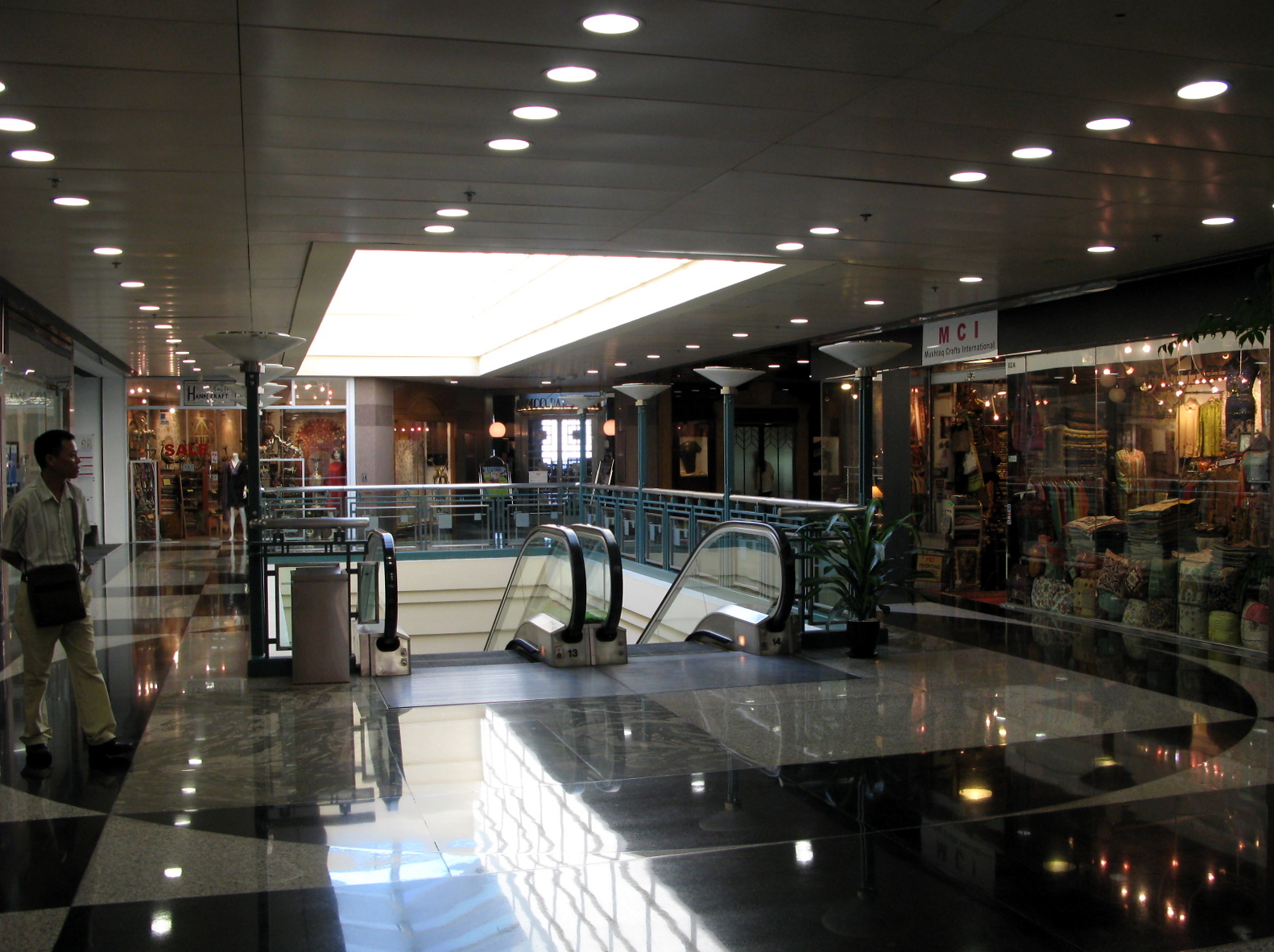
Mall, before renovation

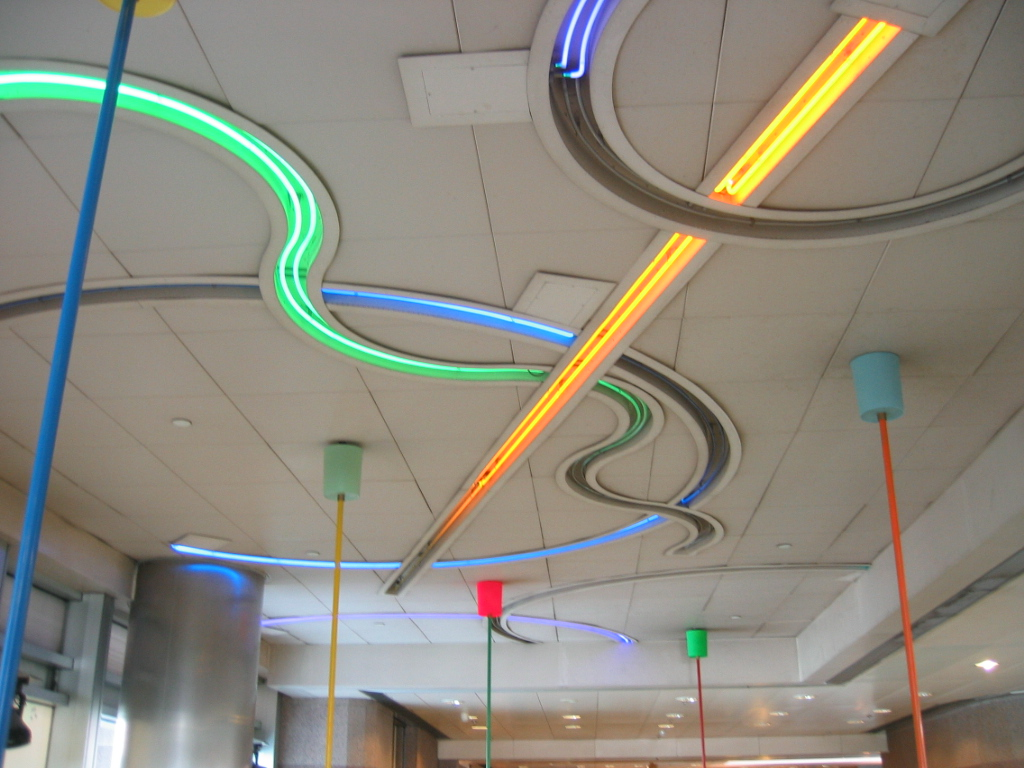
Entrance ceiling designed by Cork Marcheschi, removed in 2009

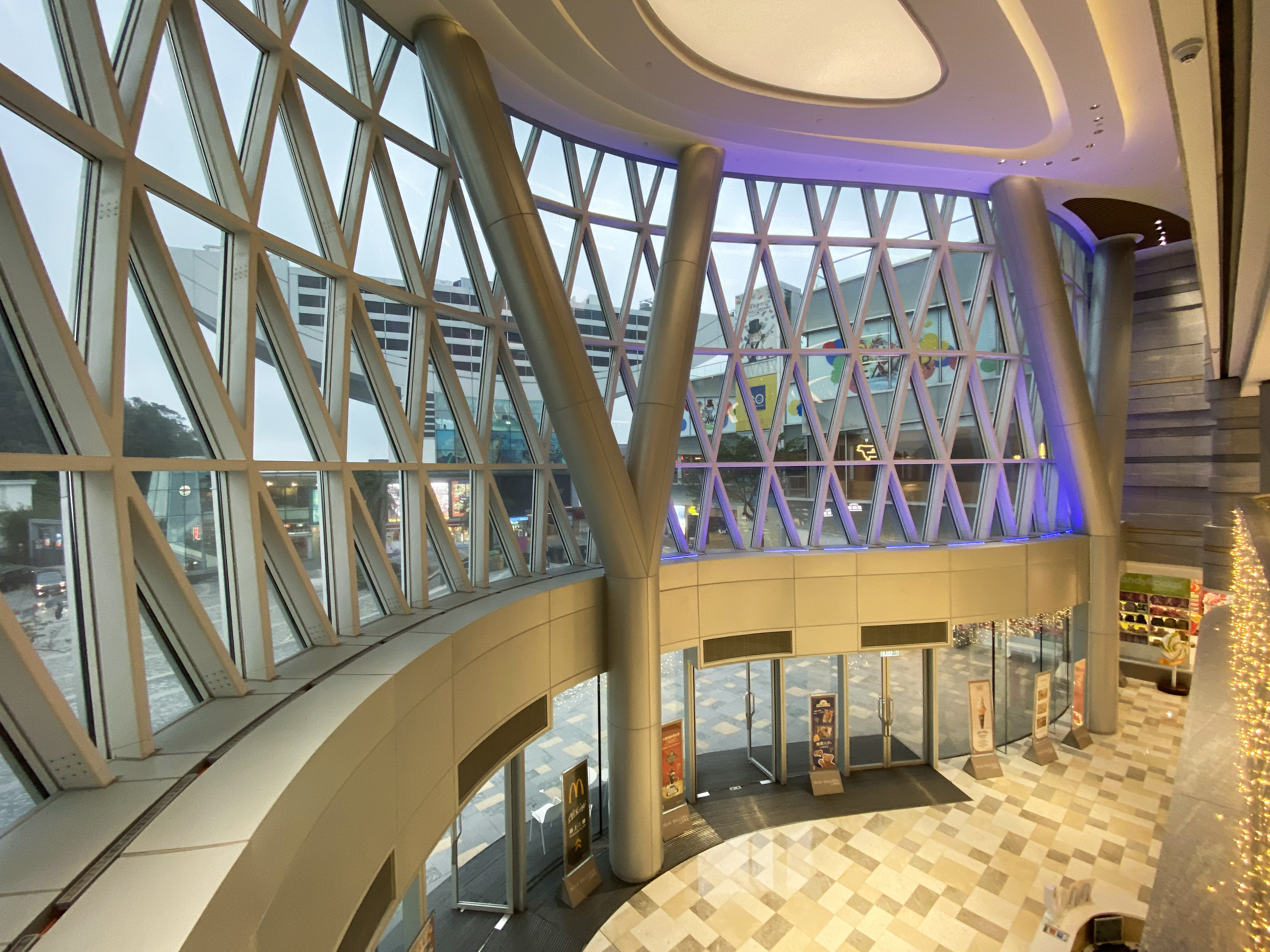
Entrance void glass wall, added after renovation

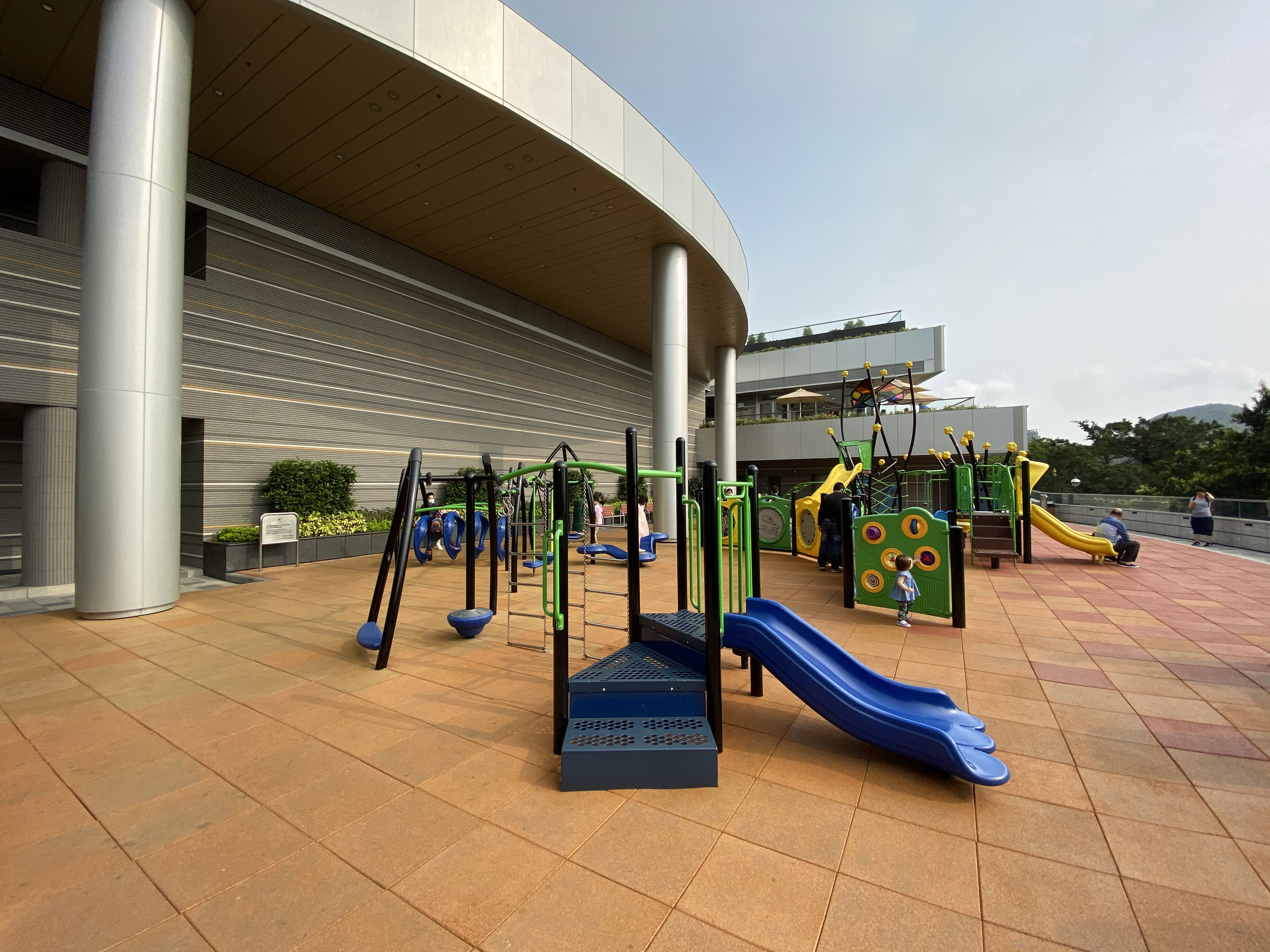
Level 1 children's playground

== See also ==
- Tourism in Hong Kong
