= Grenville House =

Apartment complex in Hong Kong

Coordinates: 22.274334°N 114.157508°E

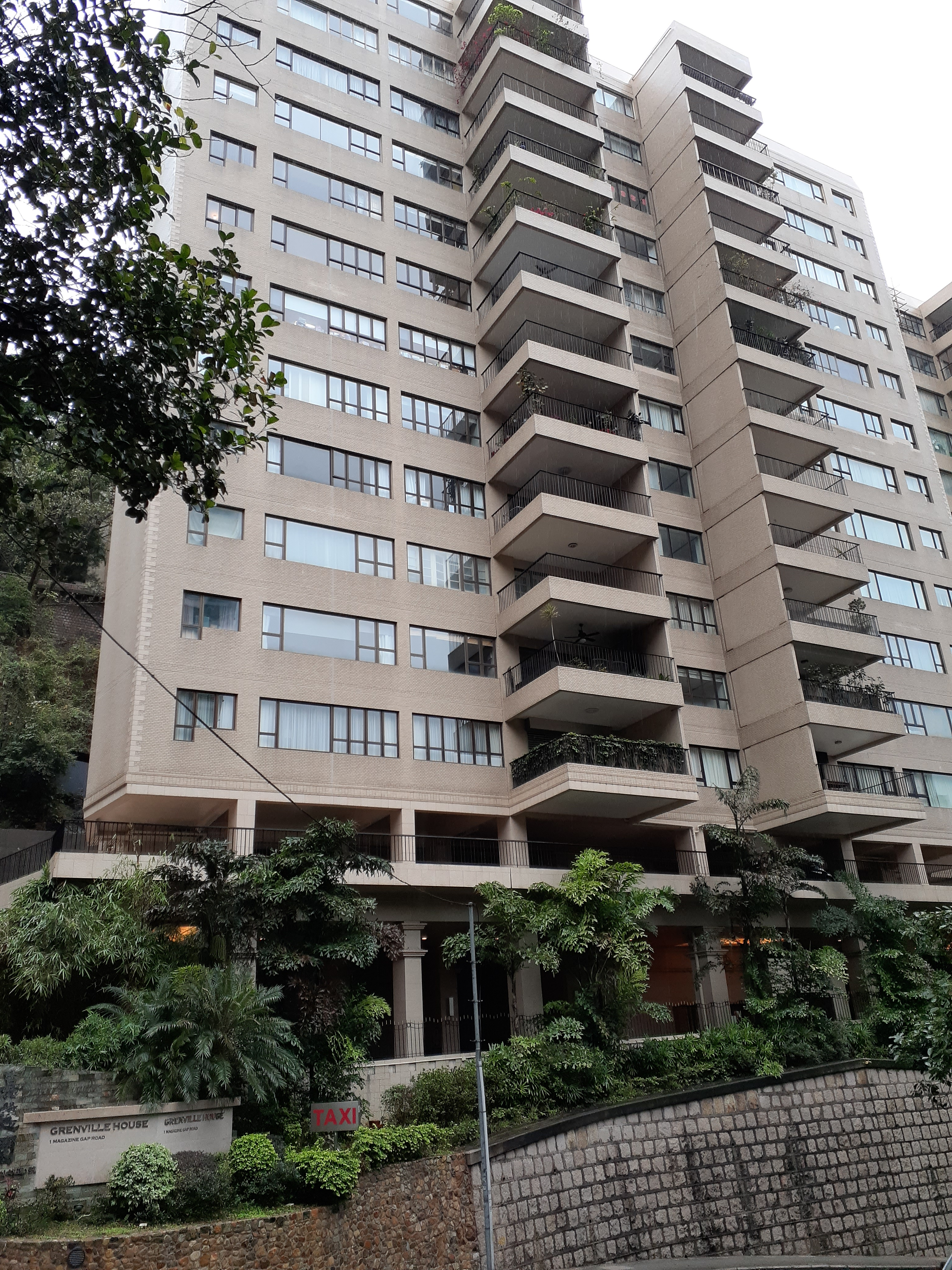
Grenville House.

Grenville House is a mid-rise (14 floors) apartment complex at 1-3 Magazine Gap Road in the Mid-levels area of Hong Kong Island. It was completed in 1971. CNBC featured Grenville House as a prestigious property with spacious homes. Apartments have a floorsize of over 3,000 square feet and include large balconies. Hong Kong governor Tung Chee Hwa lived in the building during his tenure, eschewing the government housing used during the British era of Hong Kong.

== Tung Chee-hwa residence ==
From 1997 to 2006 a four bedroom unit belonging to Tung Chee-hwa served as the official residence of the Chief Executive of Hong Kong. Tung primarily choose to remain at the Grenville House, rather than moving into the Hong Kong Government House that previous British governors resided in, because he loved his apartment. He also noted that the feng shui of the Government House was "not too good."

Chee-hwa rented the apartment during his tenure as governor, and didn't buy the flat until 2021 for HK$160 million (US$20.6 million). In 2025, Shirley Peng Shiao Ping, Tung Chee-hwa's sister, bought a HK$119 million (US$15.2 million) flat in Grenville House, in the process of buying up luxury homes.

== See also ==
There is also an identically named Outdoor Education Center, Grenville House, in Brixham, UK.
