= Conduit Road =

Road in Hong Kong

Coordinates: 22.27882°N 114.15077°E

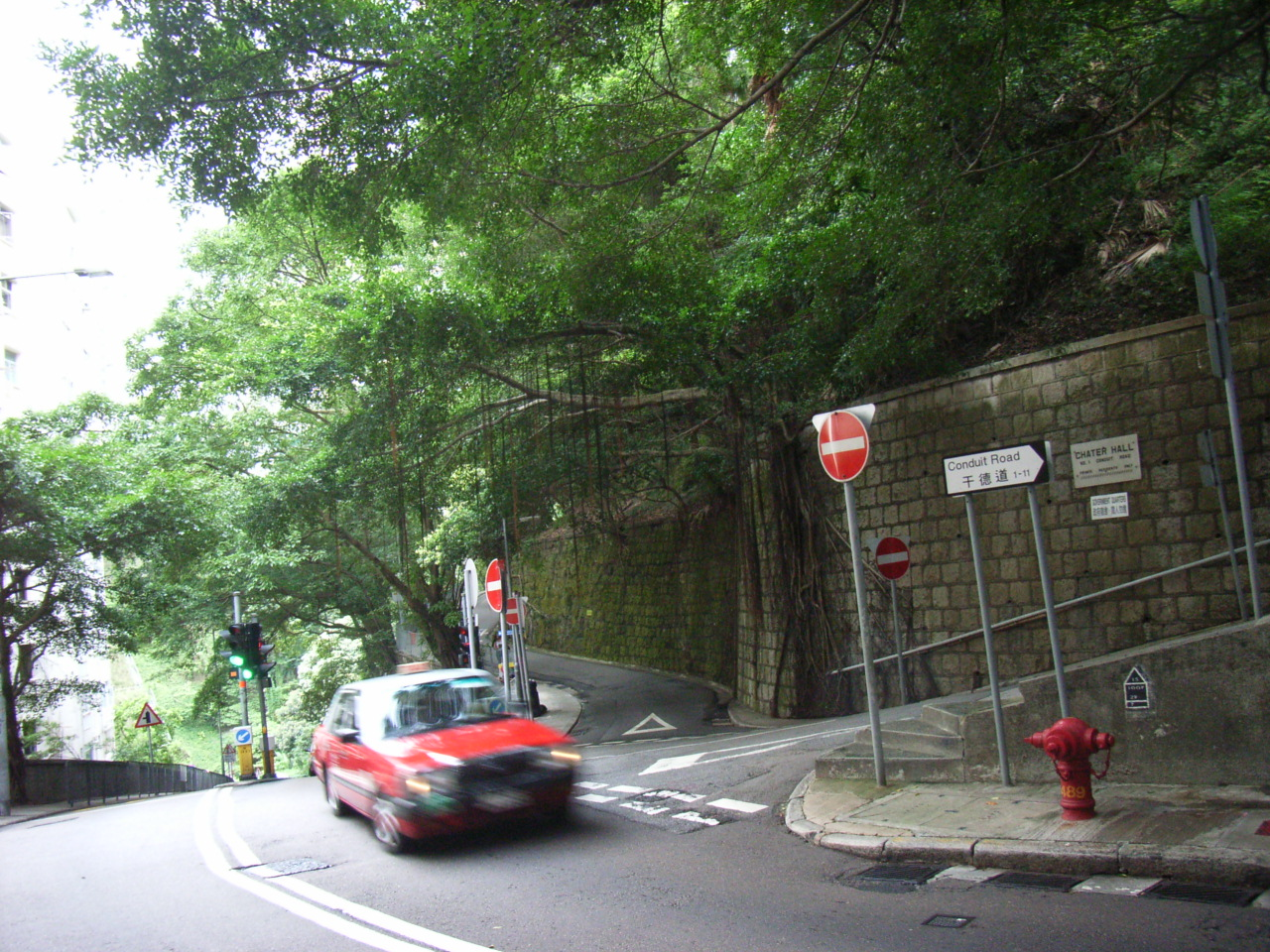
- Conduit Road, looking south from Yukon Court (No. 2 Conduit Rd).
- Chinese: 干德道
Transcriptions
Standard Mandarin
- Hanyu Pinyin: Gāndé Dào
Yue: Cantonese
- Jyutping: gon1 dak1 dou6

Former name
- Traditional Chinese: 干讀道
- Simplified Chinese: 干读道
Transcriptions
Standard Mandarin
- Hanyu Pinyin: Gāndú Dào
Yue: Cantonese
- Jyutping: gon^{1} duk^{6} dou^{6}

Conduit Road (Chinese: 干德道) is a road in the Mid-Levels on Hong Kong Island in Hong Kong.

== History ==
Constructed in 1910, it is named after the aqueduct passing underneath which carries water from the Pok Fu Lam Reservoir to the Central area. It is the highest point on Victoria Peak which is accessible via the Central–Mid-Levels escalators. It is also the second highest road in the Western Mid-Levels after the nearby Po Shan Road. The road was renamed "Izumo-dori" (出雲通) during the Japanese occupation of Hong Kong.

Conduit Road is a luxury residential area. One of the road's earliest residents was Catchick Paul Chater, who built a magnificent residence at No. 1 Conduit Road named Marble Hall, whose gatehouse is the only reminder of this connection today. At its southernmost point, Conduit Road merges with Glenealy and Hornsey Road. At its western extremity, the road forks left to Hatton Road, and right to Kotewall Road.

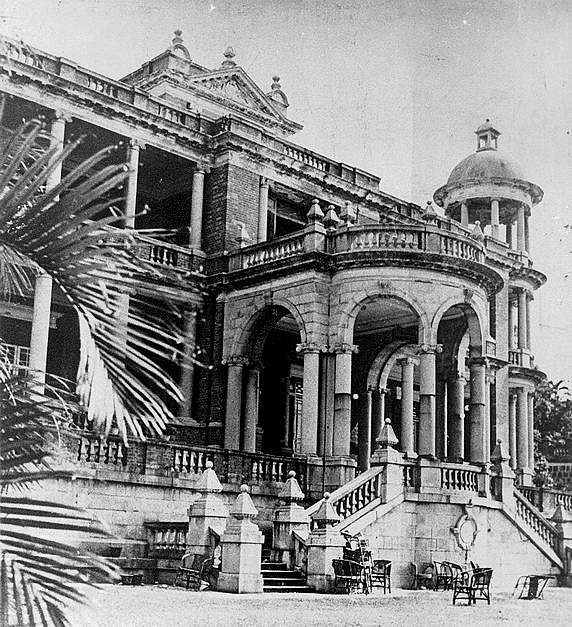
The Foreign Correspondents' Club, then located at 41A Conduit Road, is portrayed in the film as a hospital. The building was demolished in the late 1960s.

Because of its long history, some of the residences located along Conduit Road are very old, and of a lower standard to the more recent luxury developments. Examples include: Elegant Garden (No. 11); Panorama (No. 15); Cliffview Mansions (Nos. 17–19 & 21–25); Conway Mansion (No. 29); Realty Gardens (No. 41); Manly Mansion (Nos. 44 & 44A); and Woodland Gardens (Nos. 62A–F).

Until the early 1990s, the views of the harbour were mostly uninterrupted for by the mid-rise properties lining the mountainside near the eastern end of the road. However, as building height regulations were relaxed, the harbour views were erased, as colossal apartment blocks – some as much as 40 storeys high – were erected.

Demolished in the late 1960s, No. 41A Conduit Road was home to the original Foreign Correspondents' Club, and played the role of a hospital in the 1955 film Love Is a Many-Splendored Thing.

== Numbering ==
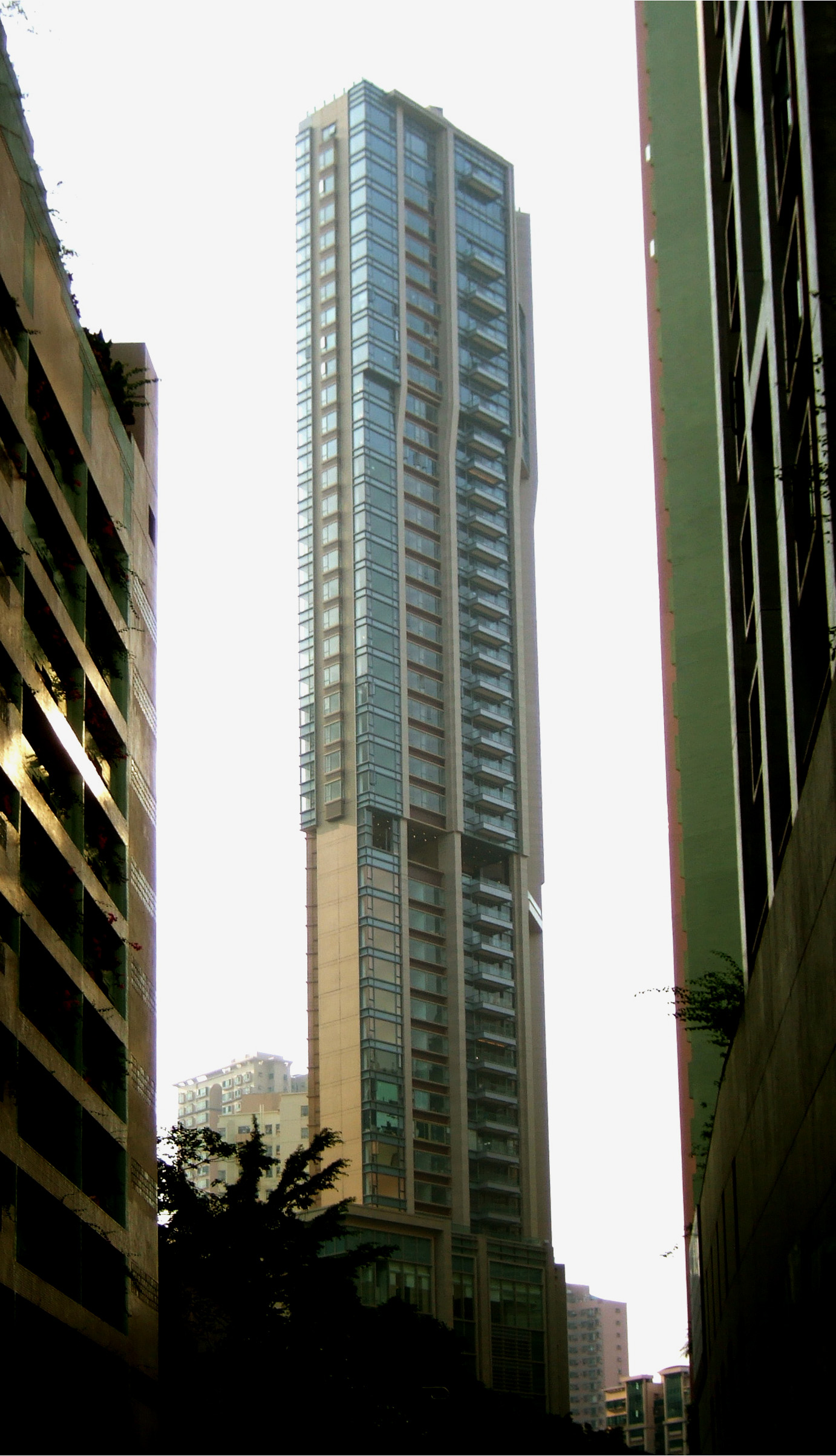
39 Conduit Road

Numbers are odd on the mountainside of the road, whilst those on the side closer to waterfront are even; this convention stems from the fact that the first properties were built along the mountainside (southern side) of the road.

The odd numbers starts at the busier eastern end of the road from the government estate Chater Hall Flats (No. 1 Conduit Road) and ends at Skyline Mansion (No. 51 Conduit Road) near the western end of the road. The even numbers start at Yukon Court (No. 2 Conduit Road) and end at Kiu Sen Court (No. 70 Conduit Road). Yukon Court is renowned as the residence of several influential Hong Kong socialites.

== Lethal landslides ==
On 7 December 1911, a major landslide, caused by heavy rainfall, killed four people at a building site during excavation works.

On 18 June 1972, an even more devastating landslide occurred. It began at a redevelopment site on Conduit Road, above Po Shan Road, and slid 270 metres down to Kotewall Road, crossing Conduit Road near No. 53. Casualties were high: 67 people killed, and 20 injured. Two buildings were totally destroyed; an estimated 40,000 cubic metres of earth and debris collapsed in the landslide.

== See also ==
- List of streets and roads in Hong Kong
- 39 Conduit Road
- Central–Mid-Levels escalators
