= Magazine Gap Road =

Street in Hong Kong

Coordinates: 22.2729°N 114.1608°E

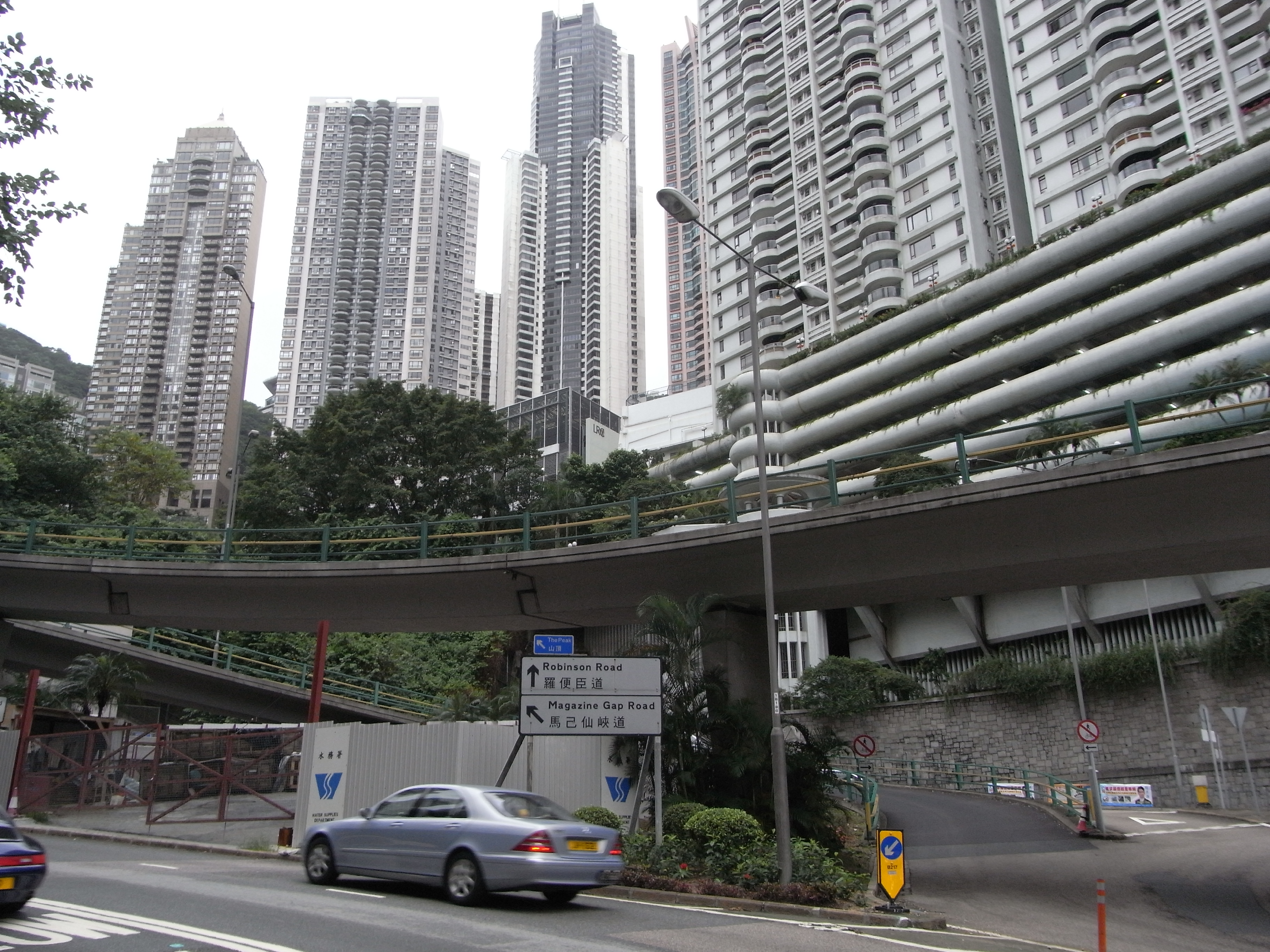
- Western terminus of Magazine Gap Road in Mid-Levels, Hong Kong
- Interactive map of Magazine Gap Road
- Native name: 馬己仙峽道 (Yue Chinese)
- Maintained by: Highways Department
- Length: 1.8 km (1.1 mi)
- Location: Mid-Levels
- East end: Bowen Hill
- West end: Robinson Road / Garden Road

Magazine Gap Road
- Traditional Chinese: 馬己仙峽道
- Simplified Chinese: 马己仙峡道
Transcriptions
Standard Mandarin
- Hanyu Pinyin: Mǎjǐxiān Xiá Dào
Yue: Cantonese
- Yale Romanization: Máh géi sīn haahp douh
- Jyutping: Maa5 gei2 sin1 haap6 dou6

Magazine Gap Road (Chinese: 馬己仙峽道; Jyutping: maa5 gei2 sin1 haap6 dou6) is a long and winding road in the affluent and ultra-expensive Mid-Levels and The Peak neighbourhoods on Hong Kong Island. It is one of the main access points to The Peak, and is the most direct route there from Central.

The road takes its name from a munitions depot which was built by the British between 1863 and 1868. The munitions were transported directly via a cable system to the arsenal which was located on today's Arsenal Street.

== Description ==
The road begins at a ramp which forks off from Robinson Road. From there, it runs uphill in an easterly direction, where it intersects first with Brewin Path, and later with Bowen Road. It continues snaking upwards, where it intersects with May Road, before terminating at its highest point at the junction with Peak Road.

== Intersections ==
The entire road is in Central and Western District.

Location	km	mi	Destinations	Notes
Magazine Gap	0.0	0.0	Peak Road	
Mid-Levels	1.1	0.68	May Road	
Mid-Levels	1.6	0.99	Bowen Road	
Mid-Levels	1.7	1.1	Brewin Path	
Mid-Levels	1.8	1.1	Robinson Road / Garden Road	
1.000 mi = 1.609 km; 1.000 km = 0.621 mi

== Hong Kong Martyrs' Tower ==
During the occupation of Hong Kong, the Japanese intended to erect an 80 metre (262.5 foot) stone memorial in honour of the Japanese soldiers and officers who died during the war. The foundation stone was laid on 9 February 1942, yet less than half the tower was completed by the time Hong Kong was liberated on 15 August 1945. Two years later, the British demolished the tower, and Cameron Mansions currently occupies the site.

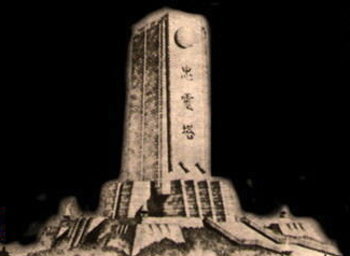
Conceptual drawing of the tower

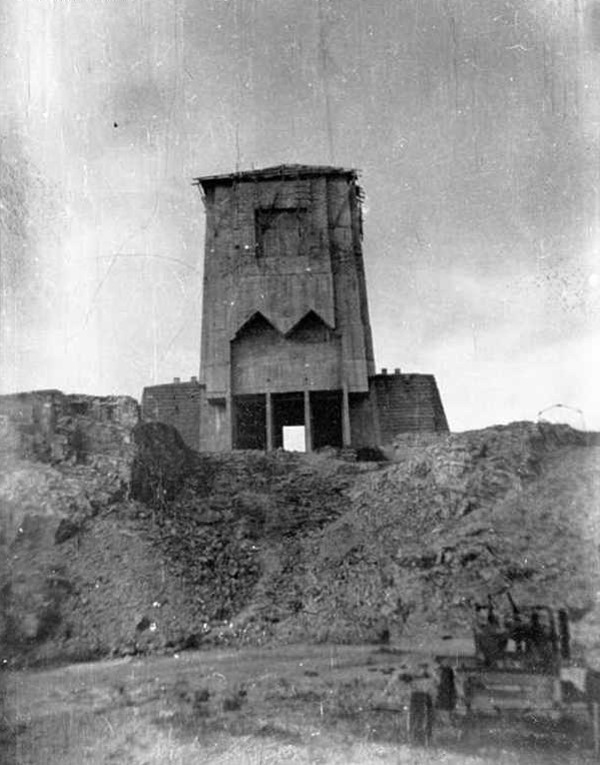
The unfinished tower in 1945

== See also ==
- List of streets and roads in Hong Kong § Hong Kong Island
- Grenville House
- Zig-zag
- Stubbs Road
