= 39 Conduit Road =

Housing block in Mid-Levels, Hong Kong

- 天匯
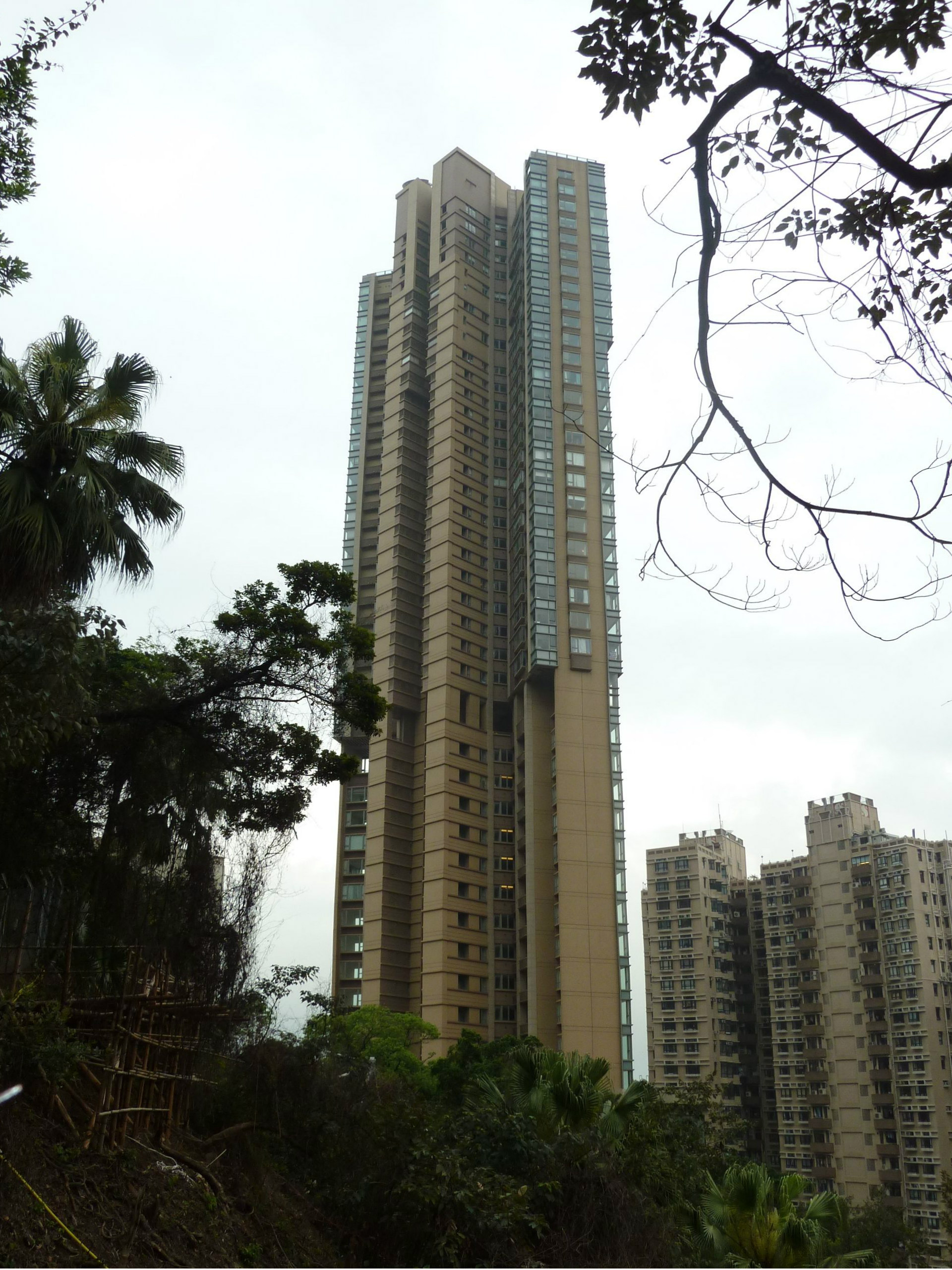
- Interactive map of the 39 Conduit Road area

General information
- Type: single tower
- Location: 39 Conduit Road, Hong Kong
- Coordinates: 22.2816°N 114.1469°E
- Construction started: 2006
- Completed: March 2009
- Landlord: Henderson Land Development

Height
- Height: 190.9 metres (626 ft)

Technical details
- Floor count: 46
- Floor area: 229,255 square feet (21,298.5 m^{2})

Design and construction
- Architect: Arthur Au
- Architecture firm: Dennis Lau & Ng Chun Man Architects & Engineers (HK) Ltd.
- Structural engineer: Stephen Cheng Consulting Engineers
- Civil engineer: Ove Arup & Partners Hong Kong Ltd
- Main contractor: Heng Shung Constrn. Co. Ltd. (subsidiary of developer)

Chinese name
- Traditional Chinese: 天匯
- Simplified Chinese: 天汇
Transcriptions
Standard Mandarin
- Hanyu Pinyin: tiān huì

References
- www.39conduitroad.com.hk

39 Conduit Road is a luxury residential property situated in Conduit Road in western mid-Levels of Hong Kong. It was developed by Henderson Land Development.

Soon after the development was launched in October 2009, the developer claimed to have sold a five-bedroom duplex flat, on the "68th floor" of the 46-story building for HK$439 million (US$57m). The price, equating to US$9,200 per square foot, set the new world record for the most expensive apartment.

There were criticisms of deceptive marketing in which the developers launched the project omitting 42 intermediate floor numbers. The development was once again the subject of controversy when only one sale had been completed within the commonly accepted three-month completion period; and all but four transactions, including the record-setting sale, were later cancelled.

== Plot history ==
The incarnation of 39 prior to the Henderson development was known as "Rocky Mount". This eleven-storey building which was completed in 1965 had a total of 44 units, was used by civil servants. Henderson chairman Lee Shau-kee began acquiring units in the residence in the 1990s. He stepped up the pace of purchases from about 2001. He initially paid HK$4 million per unit, and later units were acquired for HK$8–9 million, by which time he had amassed 41 of the 44 units. Henderson applied to the Lands Tribunal for compulsory purchase of the remaining 3 units, but this became unnecessary following an operation with Peterson Holdings Co Ltd. The 3 remaining units were eventually bought out for an average cost of HK$12 million. Lee Shau-kee, who originally owned 60 percent equity of the site of the luxury building, sold it to the company for HK$1.75 billion ($225m), or HK$12,759 psf.

== Configuration ==
The project has 45 stories above ground.

The developer gives the gross floor area at approximately 229,255 square feet (21,300 m^{2}), comprising a single tower with 6-storey podium car park, 1-storey club house and 39 residential floors. The development provides 66 residential units and 104 car parking spaces; its 66 units range in size, from 2,800 square feet (260 m^{2}) to about 7,600 square feet (710 m^{2}).

== Selling strategy ==
The developer announced it would sell 40 percent of the units in 2009. Two duplexes on the "66th floor" the building were listed – the 5,636-square-foot (523.6 m^{2}) unit was price-tagged at HK$357.7 million, and the 5,131-square-foot (476.7 m^{2}) unit is listed at HK$311.4 million. Prior to the launch, Henderson has suggested it might ask HK$100,000 psf for the two penthouse apartments on the "88th floor" not on the initial sale list.

== World record price ==
One 6,158 square feet (572.1 m^{2}) duplex apartment, the larger of two on the "68th floor" the building, has its own ballroom, outdoor swimming pool, fitness centre and outdoor patio. The headline price of HK$71,280 per square foot was achieved. The definition of the floor area is unlike that in most other real estate markets; usable living space which includes the 340 square feet (32 m^{2}) garden, and its share of communal areas. Based on a more common international measure, the square foot price would be about HK$88,000, or US$11,350 ($122,170 per square metre). According to the developer, it was sold to an unnamed buyer from mainland China through a locally registered company. A second unit on the same floor fetched HK$397 million or HK$64,605 psf. There was much controversy about price fixing by the Henderson Land Development when the company announced that it had sold a duplex apartment in the building for a record-breaking price in 2009 to an undisclosed buyer; later it was found that the buyer was a company registered in the British Virgin Islands. Not long after that it came to light that all 24 flats that Henderson Land Development had sold were bought by companies registered in the British Virgin Islands and all of them were registered by the same law firm.

In March 2015, one of its units was sold for a price of HK$433 million, with the price per sqft. amounting to HK$93,000. This supersedes the HK$82,000 price per sq.ft. record set by Swire Properties' Opus Hong Kong and throughout Asia in 2012. Although it was sold at a higher price of HK$439 million in 2009, the lower stamp duty rate at the time resulted in a lower price per square foot. The buyer is confirmed to be a non-Hong Kong resident and therefore the stamp duty payable represents a total of 23.5%, which means the buyer will have to pay over HK$100 million in stamp duty expenses.

It is Asia's most expensive property, according to the World Records Academy – the previous world record was set in London, where a flat in One Hyde Park was sold for US$9,585 per square foot. The previous Asian record was set in June 2008, when Sun Hung Kai Properties sold a 5,497 square feet (510.7 m^{2}) penthouse at The Arch for HK$41,100 per square foot. The record price set off concerns about a property bubble, and talk of the possibility of liberalising the supply of building land from the government. Experts, however, disagreed that there was any bubble, saying that property of this type was not representative of the mass housing market.

The chairman of another developer, Hang Lung Properties, expressed scepticism over the square foot price achieved, but the Henderson chairman insisted the price was real. Henderson admitted that the buyer of the record-breaking flat bought six units, whilst the South China Morning Post reported an unnamed source which said all 24 units were bought by the same individual. The SCMP noted that all 24 flats sold on the first day were bought by BVI-registered shell companies, and were handled by the same firm of solicitors. Market scepticism of the record prices achieved were due principally to the apparent over-valuation – the average price achieved was $40,000/sf, said to be at least 50 percent higher than an equivalent property nearby on Robinson Road according to estate agencies; a typical property would yield gross rental of two percent, compared to the market average of five. In May 2010, after having paying HK$1.82 billion for a plot of land on the Peak for the family residence, Lee Shau-kee admitted his son had considered the penthouse at the development, but was deterred by the asking price.

A 5,732 square feet (532.5 m^{2}) 4-bedroom duplex flat on the 46th floor with a 1,754 ft^{2} (163.0 m^{2}) rooftop terrace was sold in December 2015 for HK$595 million ($76.2 million), or HK$103,700 per sq ft ($143,000 per sq m), making it the most expensive apartment in Asia.

== Power of developers and controversy over deceptive marketing ==
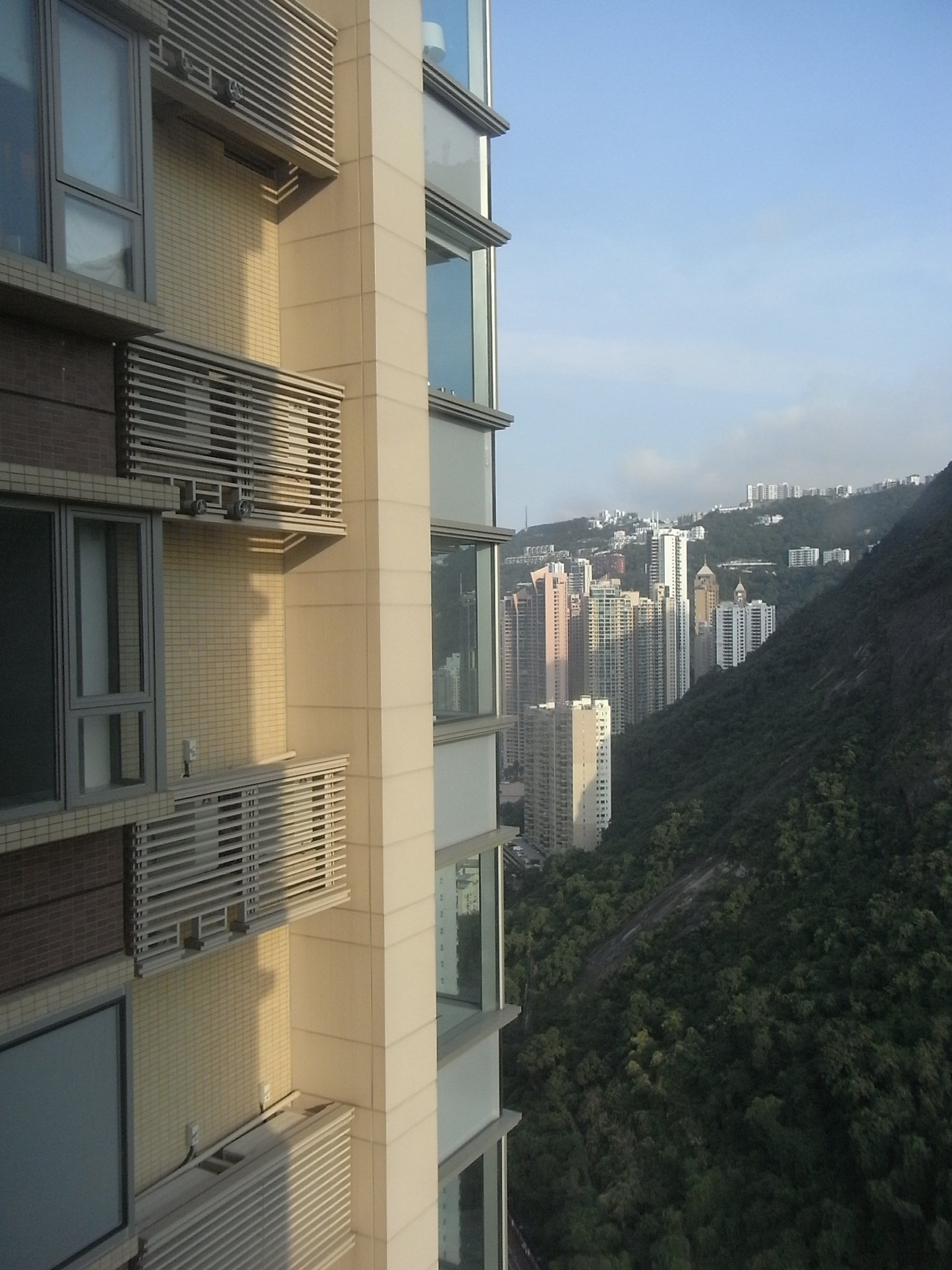
External view from kitchen of "63rd floor" apartment

Due to the meaning of numbers in Chinese culture, "auspicious" numbering system was adopted by the developers, where the top floor was "88" – Chinese for double fortune. It is already common in Hong Kong for ~4th floors not to exist; there is no requirement by the Buildings Department for numbering other than that it being "made in a logical order." A total of 42 intermediate floor numbers are omitted from 39 Conduit Road: those missing include 14, 24, 34, 64, all floors between 40 and 59; the floor number which follows 68 is 88. The Democratic Party accused the developer of misleading the public; Albert Ho, its chairman, said "..This is a classic incident to show how powerful big developers are in Hong Kong." The Consumer Council recognised the accepted common practice of skipping the 13th and 14th floors, but suggested that developers "imaginary heights brought back to earth." Henderson said that the floor numbers omitted are in line with information in sales brochures and were not inconsistent with the approved building plans and the occupation permit. Its chairman, Lee Shau-kee, said "buyers like those numbers and we aren't cheating them."

The New York Times noted that Hong Kong has had many controversies over whether developers have overstated the square footage of apartments and the value per square foot of property transactions, for example, how to count terraces, common areas and other features. An editorial in Ming Pao said: "Though developers have used controversial marketing gimmicks, the government has rarely exercised its powers to protect consumers. Citizens disapprove of developers. Many are convinced that some government policies are excessively favourable to them. That is why the generality of citizens have the impression that the government colludes with businesses."

== Delayed completions controversy ==
As at the end of March 2010, Land Registry records show only one of the 24 flats sold had been completed on, giving rise to concerns that the developer might have released misleading information. An editorial in the SCMP said greater transparency for property deals is needed: "Unusual sales transactions at 39 Conduit Road [...] call for closer scrutiny of the property market by the authorities. It does not appear that the developers have broken any law. But [...] have given rise to allegations they were seeking to manipulate the market." A reply from Henderson to the Lands Department of 24 March, which said it had entered into a verbal agreement with the 24 buyers to extend the transaction date for two to four months, subject to further extension, was not considered satisfactory by the Finance Committee of Legislative Council, which pressed the Lands Department to summon senior management of Henderson Land to explain in person why the sales of 24 flats in the development could not be completed five months after they were purportedly sold. Following the response, which was not made public, the Lands Department made a second request for more information from the developer; a four-page response was received, in which Henderson explained it allowed the buyers, all unconnected with Henderson, to extend the transaction deadline after the Hong Kong Monetary Authority issued a notice on 23 October to banks to reduce lending to finance purchase of luxury homes. The Standard reported that the Lands Department remain unsatisfied with why there was only oral agreement on the deferrals.

On 15 June, Henderson's announcement that all but four of the 24 properties at the development sold in October for record prices had been cancelled was met by uproar. Henderson said that "there was nothing untransparent", and that failure to complete was "very standard" in the industry, and the buyers' initial deposits had been forfeited. The company said the properties would be remarketed. The government has pledged to follow up on the transactions. Current regulations in force are not codified, and are in the form of a voluntary code of conduct agreed with the Property Developers' Association. The revelations, as well as on-going complaints that property sales lacked transparency and allegations of the government's collusion with officials, are putting the government under increasing pressure to enact legislation governing property transactions and render property sales practices more transparent, at the risk of angering at the city's powerful developers. The only four flats to complete were on the 30th and 31st floors, and had sold for between only HK$37,800 and HK$40,900 a square foot–less than half of the 'record. Combined with the fact that the cancelled deals were all transacted through BVI shell companies, like the law firm which handled the conveyancing, cast suspicion that they were bogus; Lee maintained they were genuine and was prepared to wager 100:1 should the deals be proven false. The Hong Kong Institute of Surveyors said the sale cancellation had done "serious damage to the developer's image and integrity"; legislators from across the political spectrum called for an investigation and further action to deal with market abuses.

In July 2010, police officers from the Commercial Crime Bureau raided the offices Henderson and those of the legal firm acting for them, taking away documents for the 20 cancelled transactions. In February 2011, the police revealed that four buyers were responsible for the 20 transactions in question, and that they had interrogated three of them; none was arrested. Media in mainland China reported that one of the buyers of three of the apartments was Ding Yuxin (also known as Ding Shumiao), who reported to be party to corruption investigations involving Railways Minister Liu Zhijun and who was herself arrested by mainland authorities in January 2011.

== See also ==
- Opus Hong Kong
- List of tallest buildings in Hong Kong
