= Opus Hong Kong =

Building in The Peak, Hong Kong

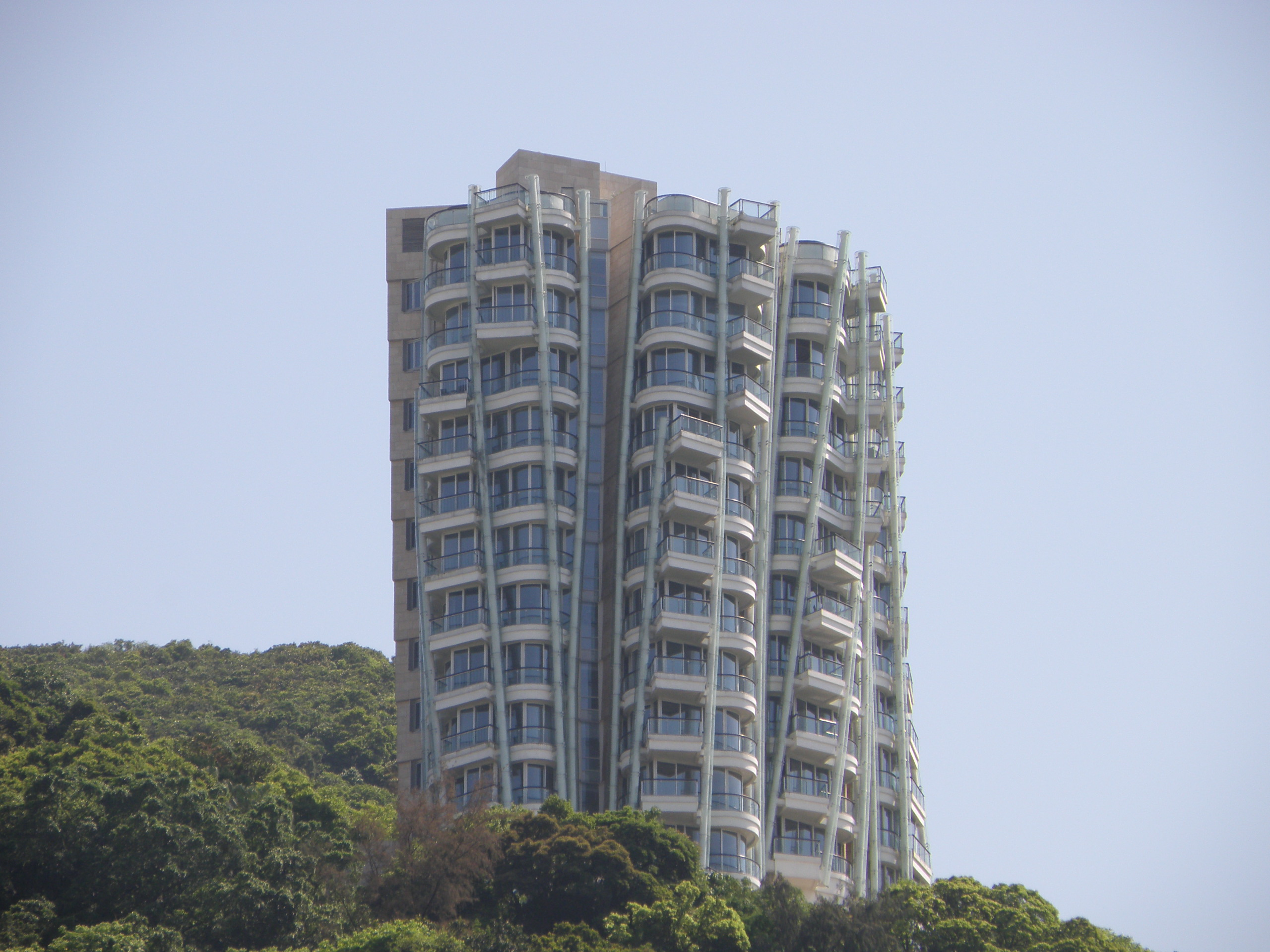
- Interactive map of the Opus Hong Kong area

General information
- Status: Completed
- Type: Residential apartments
- Architectural style: Deconstructivism (Postmodernism)
- Location: 53 Stubbs Road; Hong Kong
- Coordinates: 22.2693°N 114.1742°E
- Completed: 2012

Height
- Roof: 42.62 m (139.8 ft)

Technical details
- Floor count: 12
- Floor area: 3,020 m^{2} (32,500 sq ft)

Design and construction
- Architects: Gehry Partners; Ronald Lu and Partners
- Developer: Swire Properties

Other information
- Number of units: 12

Opus Hong Kong
- Chinese: 傲璇
Transcriptions
Standard Mandarin
- Hanyu Pinyin: Àoxuán
Yue: Cantonese
- Jyutping: ngou6 syun4

Opus Hong Kong (Chinese: 傲璇; Jyutping: ngou6 syun4) is a 12-storey, 42.62 m (139.8 ft) residential high-rise completed in 2012 at 53 Stubbs Road on Mid-Levels in Hong Kong. The project was designed by Frank Gehry in collaboration with Ronald Lu and Partners, and developed by Swire Properties. It was Gehry's first Asian residential project.

The building consists of 12 residential units which range from 560 to 640 m^{2} (6,000 to 6,900 sq ft), including two duplexes with pools. Additional features on the 3,020 m^{2} (32,500 sq ft) site include underground parking, swimming pools, gyms, rainwater recycling for irrigation, and electric car charging systems. A 580 m^{2} (6,200 sq ft) apartment, taking up the entire eighth floor, became the most expensive apartment in Hong Kong when it was sold for HK$470 million in August 2012.

The British Consul-General to Hong Kong has resided here since 2013.

External views of Opus Hong Kong
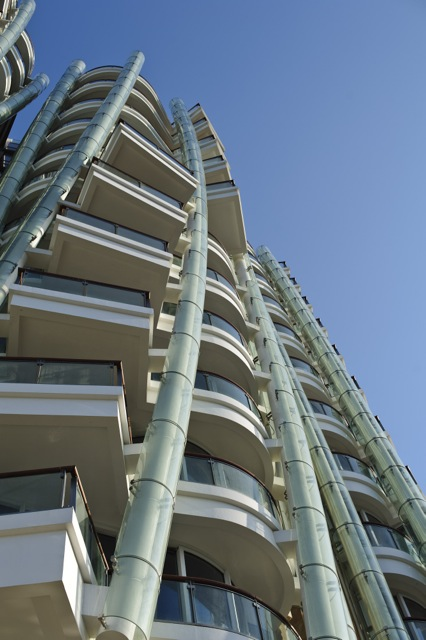

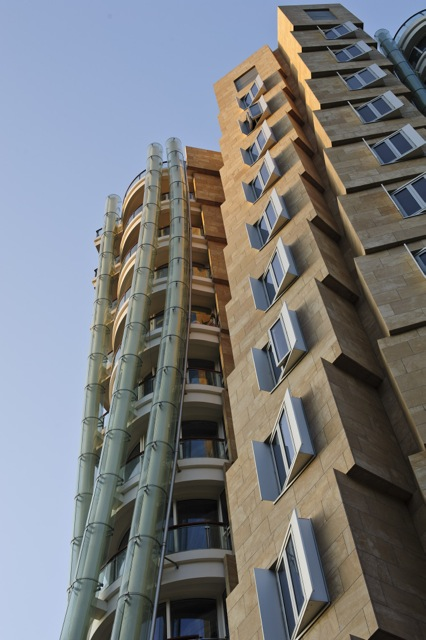

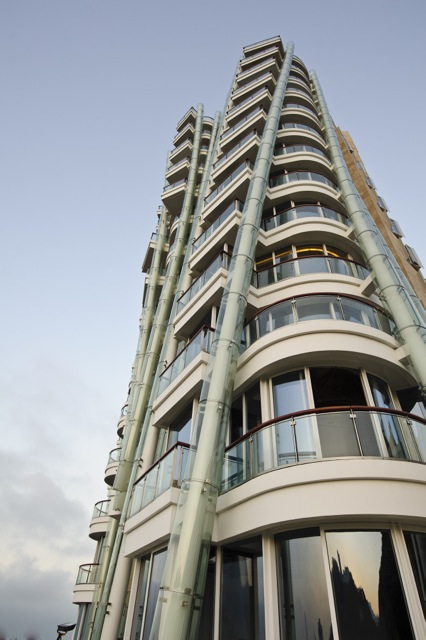

== See also ==
- 39 Conduit Road
