= Old Peak Road =

Road in Hong Kong

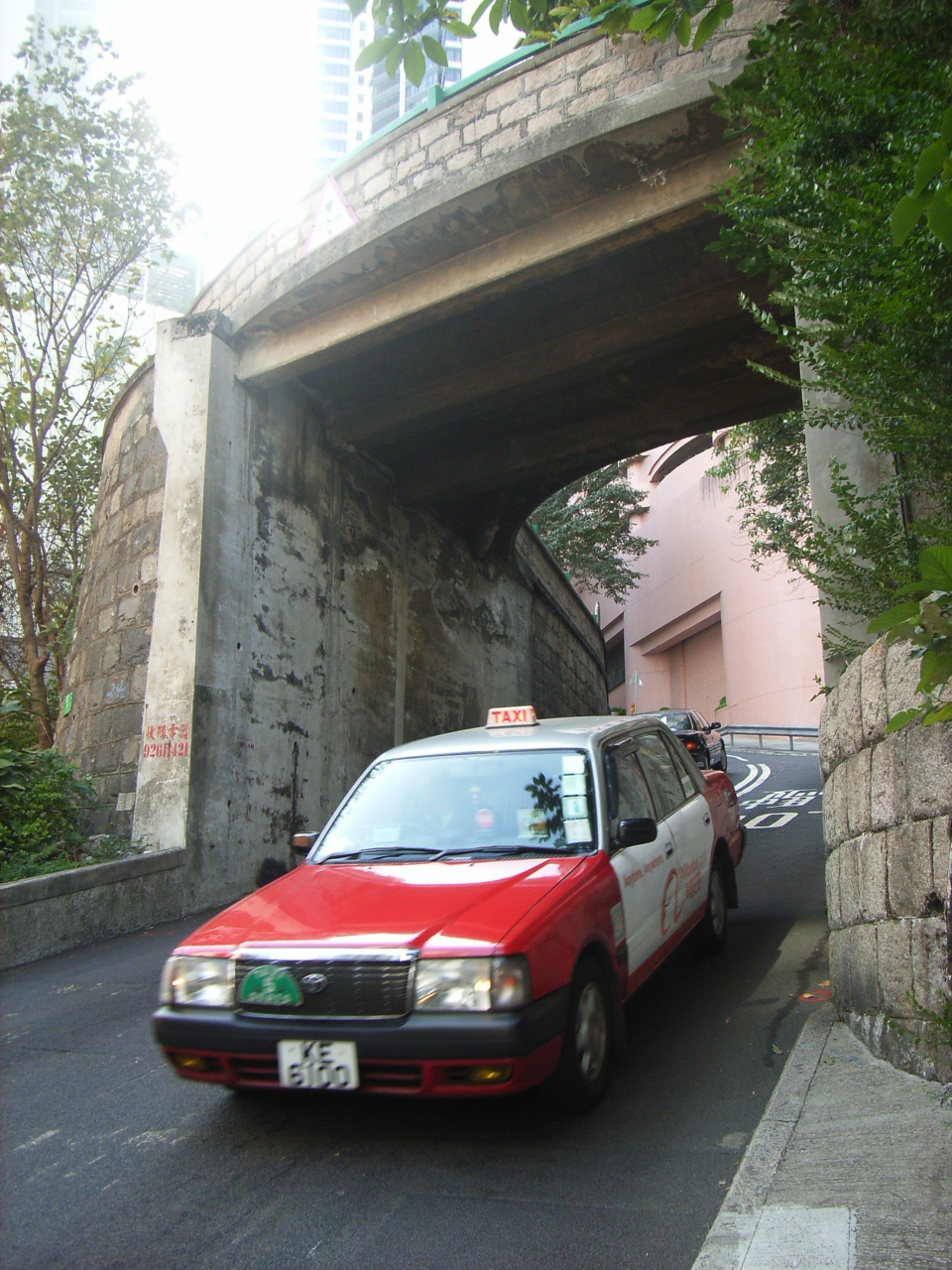
- A red taxi passes under the May Road bridge whilst descending Old Peak Road in January 2007
- Interactive map of Old Peak Road
- Native name: 舊山頂道 (Yue Chinese)
- Location: Mid-Levels, Hong Kong

Old Peak Road
- Traditional Chinese: 舊山頂道
Transcriptions
Yue: Cantonese
- Yale Romanization: Jiù shān dǐng dào
- Jyutping: gau6 saan1 ding2 dou6

Old Peak Road (Chinese: 舊山頂道; Jyutping: gau6 saan1 ding2 dou6) is a road in the Mid-Levels on Hong Kong Island. It is the most direct route from Victoria Gap and Victoria Peak to the Central District. The highest elevation is approximately 350 metres (1,148 feet), whilst the highest altitude of the part of the road which is accessible to vehicular traffic is around 200 metres (656 ft).

The road begins at the southwestern tip of Albany Road, whence it climbs steadily to Tregunter Path, passing Hornsey Road and May Road along the way. Northbound traffic is not permitted to travel as far the Path, and is obliged to turn back once it reaches the Dynasty Court estate. From there, Old Peak Road descends to the junction with Robinson Road.

== History ==
Built in the 1920s, and formerly known as Peak Road, the road was initially the sole route to the summit of Victoria Peak. Its name was changed to Old Peak Road in the 1960s, after a section of Stubbs Road which connects Wan Chai Gap with Victoria Peak was renamed Peak Road. One of the six remaining Victoria City Boundary Markers is located on Old Peak Road.

== Features ==
Old Peak Road is lined with luxury housing estates comprising tower blocks whose height exceeds 100 metres (328 feet) including Garden Terrace, Dynasty Court, and Hillsborough Court. The surface area of most residential units on these estates exceeds 1,000 square feet (93 square metres).

The two-storey Peak Depot, located at No. 102 Old Peak Road, was built in the 1910s, and served as the Water Supplies Department's office, warehouse, and staff quarters. Historical documents show that the warehouse was also used as a dormitory for sedan chair bearers; it was listed as a Grade II historic building by the Antiquities Office.

The Victoria City Boundary Marker on Old Peak Road

== See also ==
- List of streets and roads in Hong Kong
