= May Road =

Road in Hong Kong

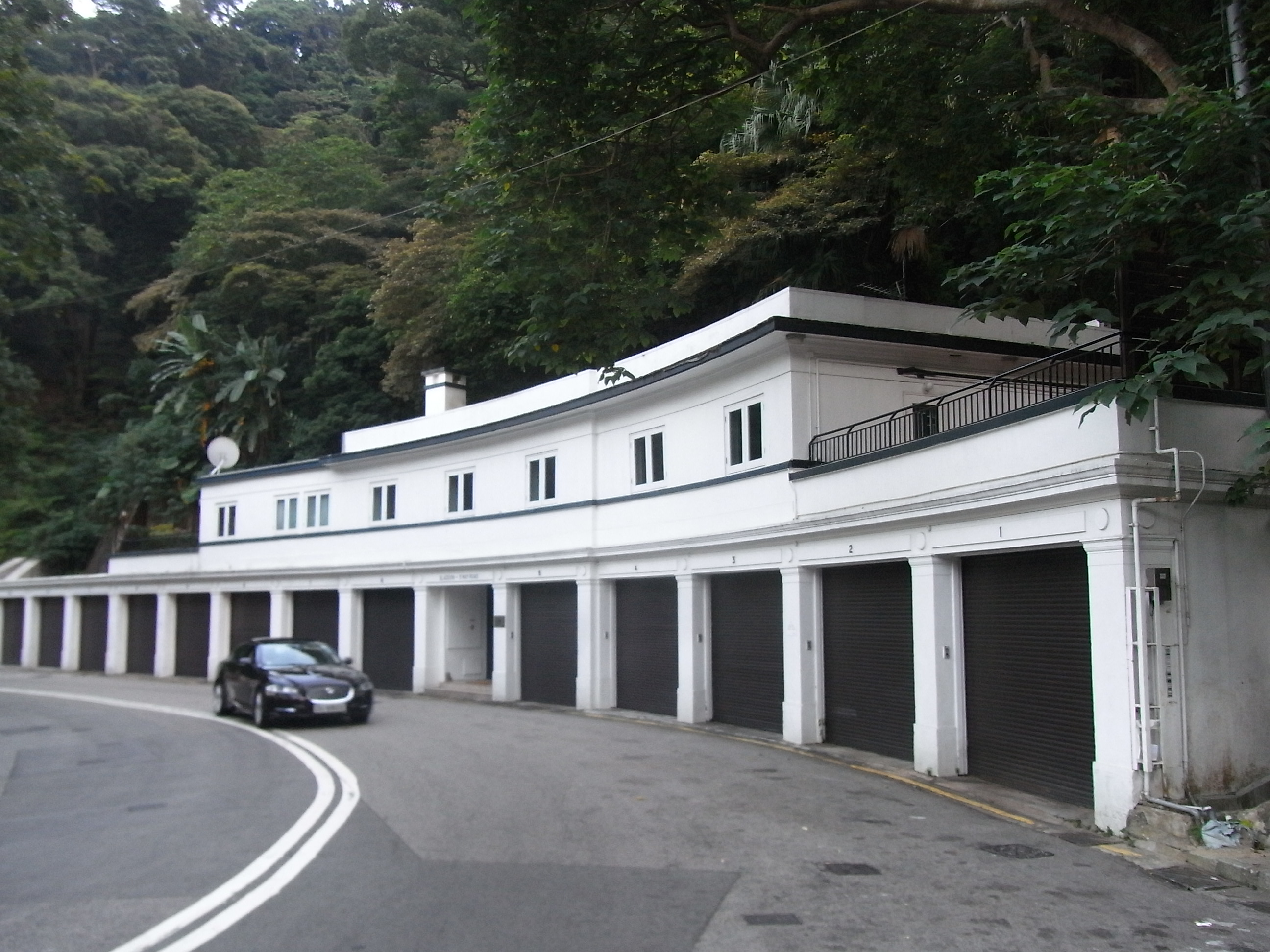
Gladdon garages along May Road

May Road (Chinese: 梅道) is a road in the Mid-Levels on Hong Kong Island. It is named after Sir Francis Henry May, the 15th Governor of Hong Kong.

The road begins at the junction with Magazine Gap Road, winding its way westwards, where it intersects with Tregunter Path and Clovelly Path, before eventually connecting with Old Peak Road via a single-lane bridge.

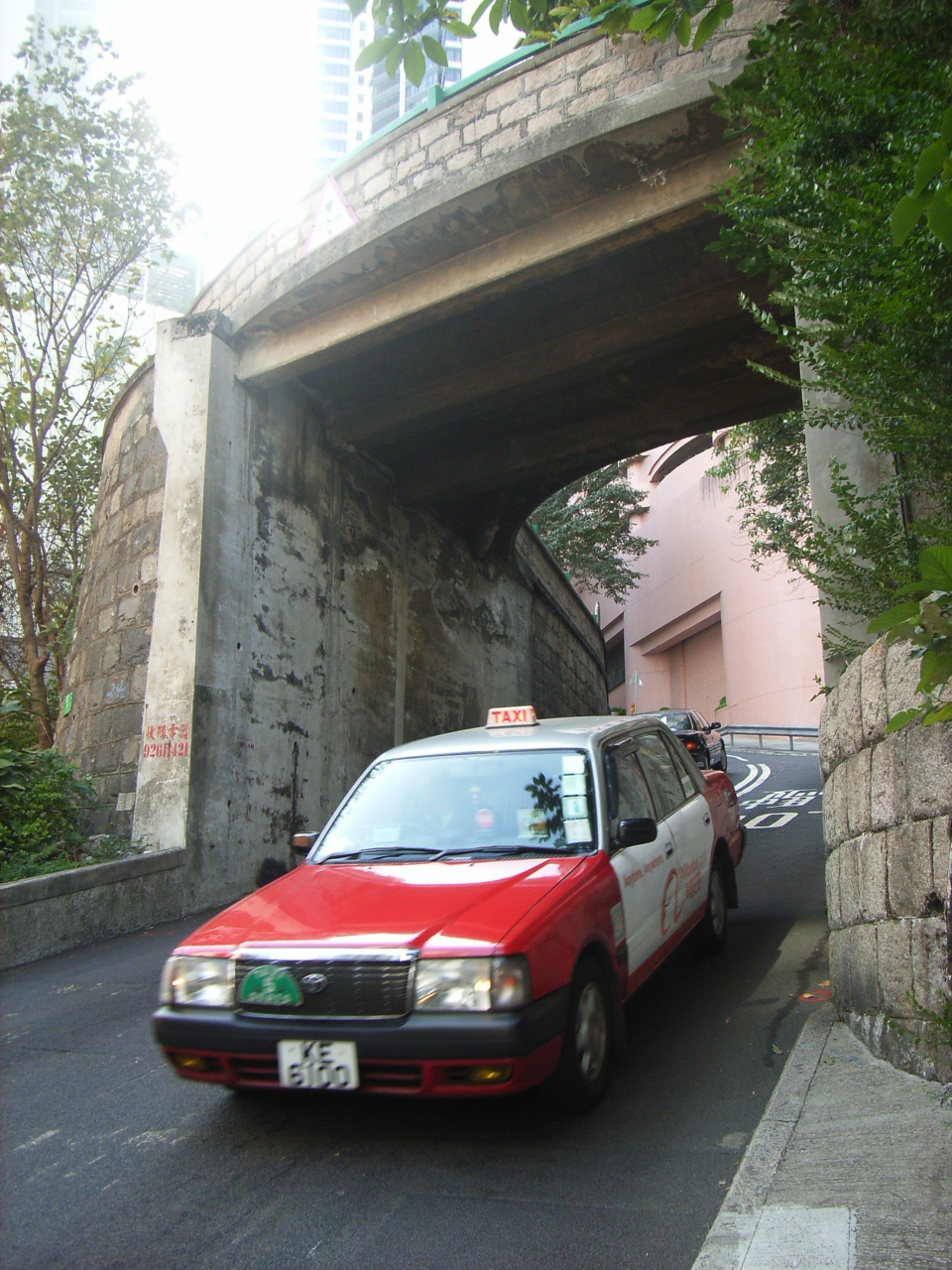
A red taxi passes under the May Road bridge whilst descending Old Peak Road in January 2007

== See also ==
- List of streets and roads in Hong Kong
