= Mid-Levels =

Residential neighbourhood on Hong Kong Island

Coordinates: 22°16′57″N 114°08′33″E

Mid-Levels 半山區
- residential neighbourhood
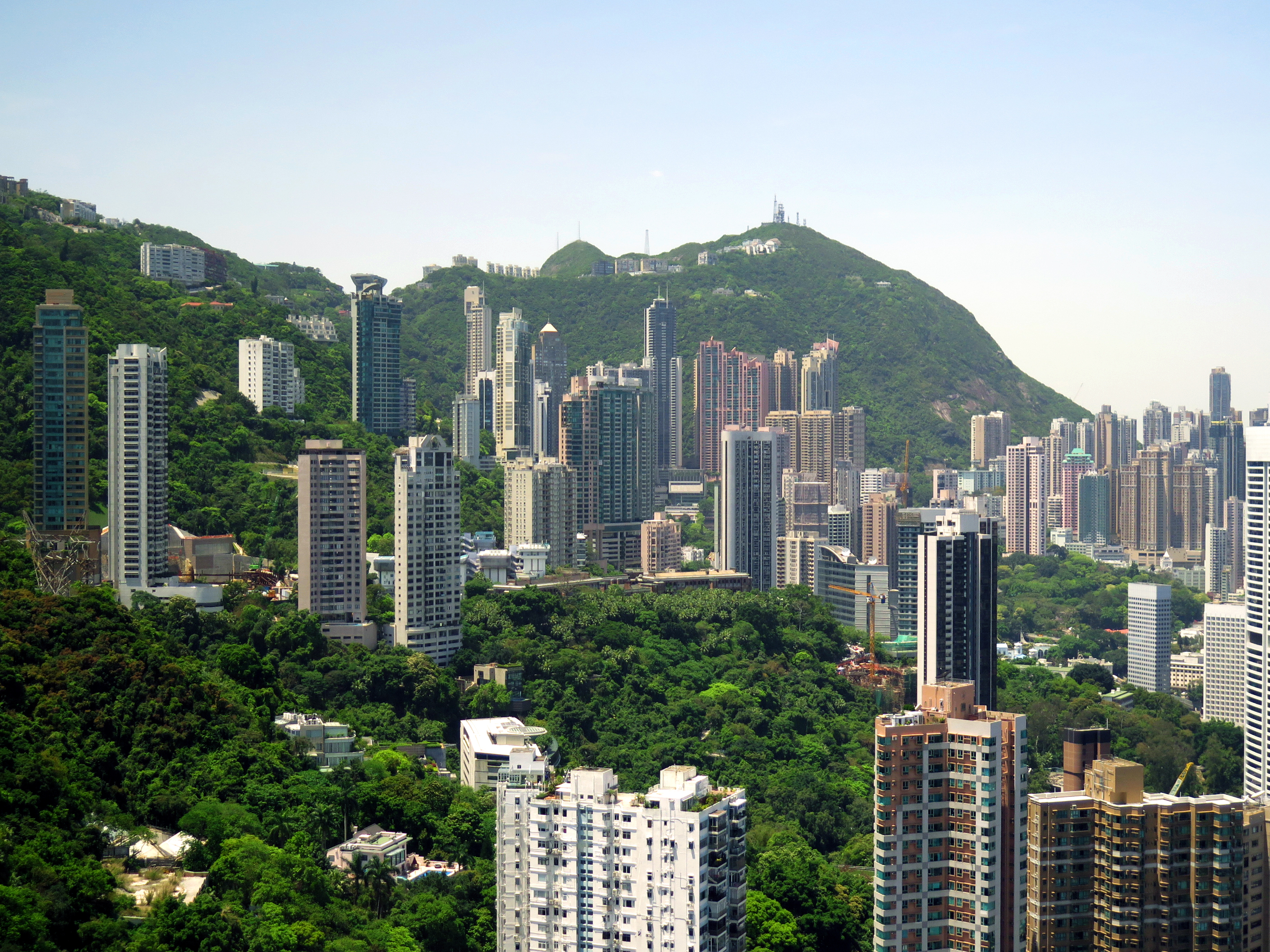
- Residential complex of the Mid-Levels in 2015
- Interactive map of Mid-Levels
- SAR: Hong Kong
- Region: Hong Kong Island
- District: Central and Western (part), Wan Chai (part) and Eastern District (part)

Mid-Levels
- Traditional Chinese: 半山區
- Simplified Chinese: 半山区
- Literal meaning: mid mountain area
Transcriptions
Standard Mandarin
- Hanyu Pinyin: Bànshānqū
Yue: Cantonese
- Yale Romanization: Bun sāan kēui
- Jyutping: Bun3 saan1 keoi1
- Sidney Lau: Boon3 saan1 kui1

Mid-Levels (Chinese: 半山區; Jyutping: bun3 saan1 keoi1) is an affluent residential area on Hong Kong Island in Hong Kong. It is located between Victoria Peak and Central. Residents are predominantly more affluent Hong Kong locals and expatriate professionals.

It has a population of 49,320 people, with 62.4% being Chinese. The largest ethnic minority groups include Filipinos (15%) and white (10.1%) .

The Mid-Levels is further divided into four areas (From the below, Mid-Levels of Central District can be subdivided into two Mid-Levels. Included: Mid-Levels West and Mid-Levels Central):

- Mid-Levels West (near Central, Sheung Wan and Sai Wan including Bonham Road, Caine Road, and Conduit Road etc.
- Mid-Levels Central (near Central, Admiralty and Wan Chai, above the Hong Kong Zoological and Botanical Gardens and Hong Kong Park. Including MacDonnell Road, Kennedy Road, Old Peak Road and Bowen Road) etc.
- Mid-Levels East (near Causeway Bay, including Jardine's Lookout, Stubbs Road and Mount Butler),
- Mid-Levels North (near North Point including Braemar Hill).

Aside from the panoramic views of Victoria Harbour and the rest of the city, it is also close to Central and Admiralty, which are both significant business areas, thus providing easy and convenient access for the business people living in Mid-Levels. An added attraction of the Mid-Levels is its close proximity to nature and comparatively better air quality than many parts of Hong Kong Island. Many wealthy people in Hong Kong are willing to pay higher residential property prices for a residence that is further away from pollution and yet remains close to the centre of the city.

Many streets are named after former governors of Hong Kong. Examples include Bonham Road (after George Bonham, 1848–1854) and Kennedy Road (after Arthur Edward Kennedy, 1872–1877). Many of the roads in this area are within walking distance of the Central Business District, which is accessible by the Mid-Levels escalator from Central.

Many choices for housing are available, from ultra-luxurious apartments to compact, near-luxury apartments. The costs of these apartments vary considerably according to the size, location, and age of the building. The cost ranges from the high ten million dollars to over five hundred million Hong Kong dollars for an apartment in a Frank Gehry-designed building.

Many prestigious colleges and schools are located in Mid-Levels, including the University of Hong Kong, St Francis' Canossian College, Island School, King's College, Ying Wa Girls' School, St. Paul's Co-educational College and St. Joseph's College, to name a few.

== History ==
The first houses in Mid-Levels were often large mansions, with gardens built out on terraces on the steep hillside, with names such as "Rose Hill" and "Cringleford", and "Idlewild". Sara Roosevelt, the mother of Franklin D. Roosevelt, lived with her family on Rose Hill from 1862 to 1865 during the American Civil War.

== Central–Mid-Levels escalator ==
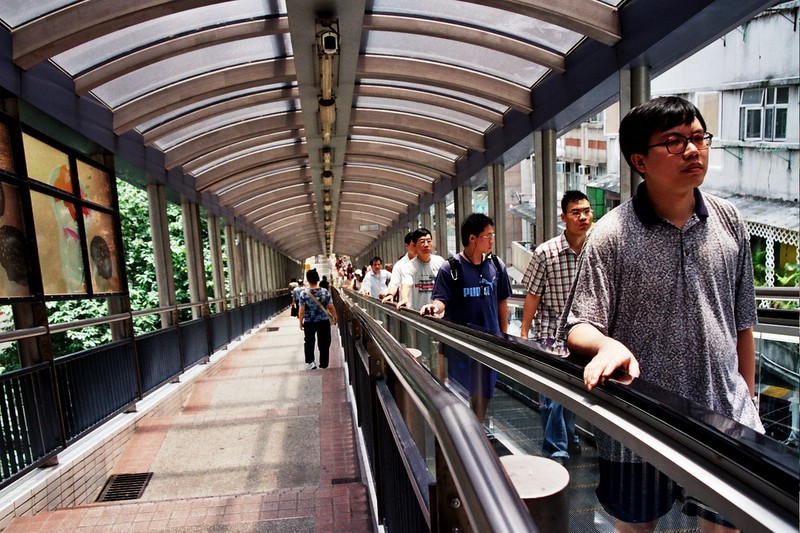
Central–Mid-Levels escalator

The Central–Mid-Levels escalator cuts through the Mid-Levels, from Central to Conduit Road. It allows people to travel quickly between these two places, compared with travelling by the winding roads up the mountain. At 800 metres (2,600 ft), it is the longest outdoor escalator in the world. It was opened on 15 October 1993. The escalator runs downhill from 6 am to 10 a.m. and uphill from 10:30 a.m. to midnight every day. Pedestrians travelling in the opposite direction make use of the adjacent stairs and footpaths. Apart from its transportation function, it is a tourist attraction. Sections of the escalator had been under renovation in 2018 and 2019, with some sections closed for maintenance.

== Streets ==
Streets in Mid-Levels include (but not limited to):

- Arbuthnot Road
- Babington Path
- Bonham Road
- Bowen Road
- Breezy Path
- Caine Road
- Castle Road
- Conduit Road
- Cotton Tree Drive
- Kennedy Road
- Kotewall Road
- Lyttleton Road
- MacDonnell Road
- Magazine Gap Road
- May Road
- Mosque Junction
- Mosque Street, Hong Kong
- Park Road
- Rednaxela Terrace
- Robinson Road, Hong Kong
- Seymour Road

== Recreation ==
=== Hong Kong Park ===
Hong Kong Park, which is 80,000 m^{2} in area, is located next to Cotton Tree Drive in Central. There are modern facilities surrounded by a natural landscape.

=== Hong Kong Zoological and Botanical Gardens ===
The Hong Kong Zoological and Botanical Gardens is one of the oldest Zoological and Botanical centres in the world. It is located on the northern slope of Victoria Peak and has been opened to the public since 1862. In 1871, it was officially renamed to Botanical Gardens, and in 1975, the name was changed again to Hong Kong Zoological and Botanical Gardens. This venerable park was previously named Bing Tao Garden, meaning the Chief Commander's Garden. It was then linked to the garden of the Government House. In 1941, a bronze statue of King George VI was erected in the garden to mark the centenary year in which Hong Kong became a British Colony.

Keeping wild animals in the garden can be traced as early as 1876. At that time, animals were kept merely for entertainment. From the 1970s, the emphasis changed to techniques in captive breeding and conservation breeding programmes for zoological collection. Today, the garden has a collection of over 600 birds, 70 mammals, and 40 reptiles which are housed in about 40 enclosures. The collection includes orangutans, gibbons and other primates; the American flamingo, jaguar and Burmese python can be found here as well. There is an active breeding programme for many of these species, notably the orangutans, gibbons, and lemurs which rarely breed in captivity.

The garden keeps for more than 1000 species of inland plant such as conifer, fig, palm, gum trees, and magnolia. Besides, a greenhouse at the eastern boundary of the garden houses over 150 native and exotic species including orchids, ferns, bromeliads, climbers and house plants.

=== Lung Fu Shan Country Park ===
Lung Fu Shan Country Park covers the densely vegetated slopes of Lung Fu Shan, including the disused Pinewood Battery and the Pinewood Garden picnic area, providing a scenic backdrop to the residential and commercial districts of Hong Kong Island. It is situated at the north of Pok Fu Lam Country Park. Towards the east of Lung Fu Shan Country Park is Hatton Road, to the south is Harlech Road whereas to the north and west is a covered conduit constructed by the Water Supplies Department. This country park covers an area of about 470,000 m^{2} and also commands an excellent vista of the western part of the territory and the Victoria Harbour.

=== Wan Chai Nature Trail ===
Wan Chai Nature Trail is a short footpath and it only takes about 2 hours to complete. Along the way, one can gain knowledge about nature, mainly concerning biological, geological and geographical aspects.

== Art and culture ==
=== Flagstaff House Museum ===
Flagstaff House Museum of Tea Ware (茶具文物館), a branch museum of the Hong Kong Museum of Art, is located at the Hong Kong Park. The building was built in the 1840s, and originally served as the office and residence of the Commander of the British Forces in Hong Kong. It was converted to the Museum of Tea Ware in 1984, with a new wing, the K.S. Lo Gallery, constructed in 1995.

Flagstaff House Museum of Tea Ware specialises in the collection, study, and display of teaware. The museum promotes Chinese tea drinking culture through many exhibitions. There are video programmes and audio guides conducted in Cantonese and Japanese, regular presentations and lecture programmes, and free guided tours for the visiting tourists.

The Chinese Teahouse, which is a part of the museum, holds serving tea demonstrations regularly.

=== Hong Kong Visual Arts Centre ===
The Hong Kong Visual Arts Centre is located at Kennedy Road in Central, with the main aim of supporting local art creation. The centre was restructured from an early 20th-century building (Cassels Block, former barracks for married British officers) to provide an arena and facilities for local artists.

=== University Museum and Art Gallery ===
The University Museum and Art Gallery (UMAG) is located inside the University of Hong Kong, with an aim to promote Chinese art and culture to college students and the entire community. The UMAG usually holds some exhibitions and art educational activities to promote the art education in Hong Kong. The museum is located in the Fung Ping Shan Building, which is situated next to the main entrance of the university. In addition, the Art Gallery is located in the three lower stories of the T T Tsui Building.

=== Kom Tong Hall ===
The Dr. Sun Yat-sen Museum is located in the Kom Tong Hall, an old mansion in Castle Road. It contains exhibitions on the life of Dr. Sun Yat-sen and history of the building.

Previously, the Church of Jesus Christ of Latter-day Saints owned the Kom Tong Hall. The building was converted to a church building on the lower floors and served as an office for the Asia Area on the upper floors. It was then donated back to the government of Hong Kong. The building was replaced by the church in June 2005 with the newly constructed Wan Chi Church Building on Gloucester Road in Wan Chai.

During World War II this building was supposedly used as the Japanese Headquarters in Hong Kong.

== Education ==
Many schools and colleges can be found in the Mid-Levels. The most famous is the University of Hong Kong. Many famous secondary schools such as St. Joseph's College, St. Paul's College, St. Paul's Co-Educational College, King's College, St. Stephen's Girls' College and Raimondi College are also located here.

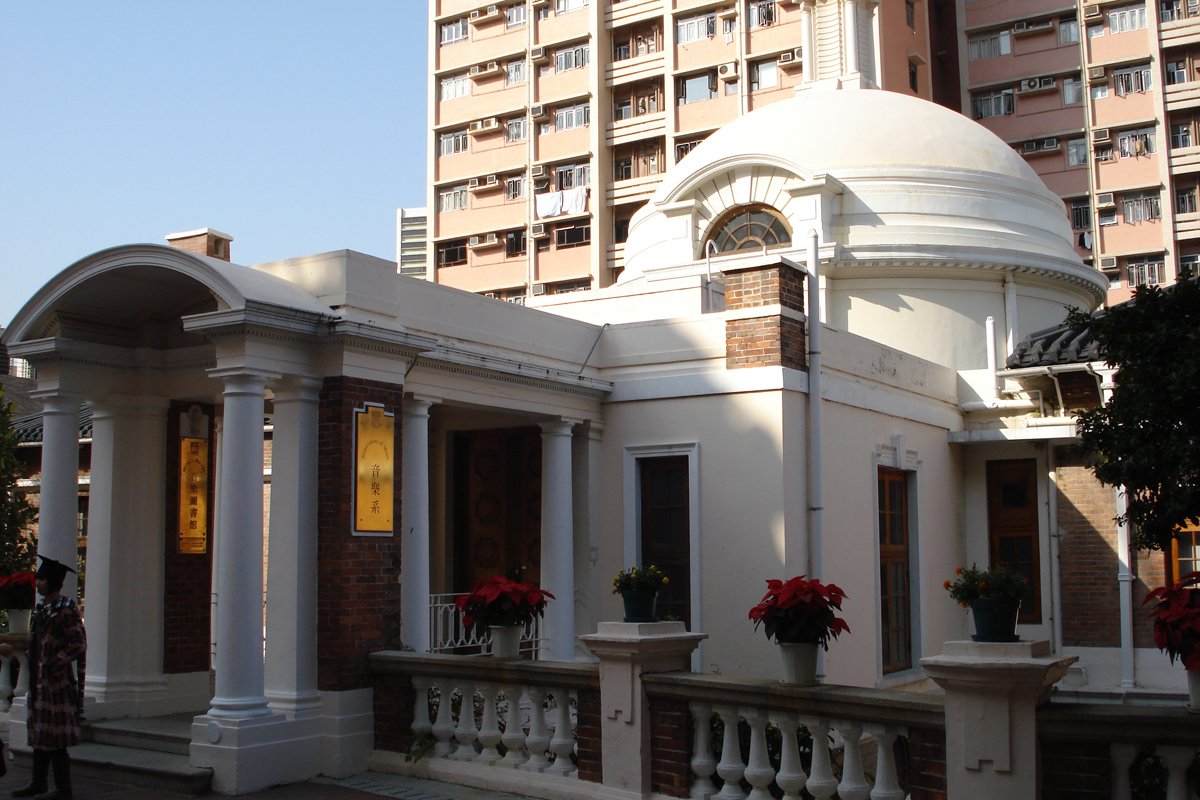
Hung Hing Ying Building of the University of Hong Kong

=== University of Hong Kong ===
The Main Building of the University of Hong Kong is the oldest of all the university's structures. Donated by Sir H.N. Mody, this building's construction began in 1910 and was completed in 1912 at Pok Fu Lam Road. It is made of red bricks and granite and has four turrets with a central clock tower. The clock tower was donated by Sir Paul Chater.

The central Great Hall of Main Building is named after the wealthy businessman Lok Yew. During the Second World War, the entire building was damaged but was later repaired. In 1952, two more courtyards were built south of the building and an additional one was completed in 1958. At present, the building houses various departments of the Arts Faculty.

In 1919, Sir Paul Chater and Professor G P Jordan donated money for the construction of the Hung Hing Ying Building, located near the Main Building. This building was designed to house the student union. After the Second World War, it became the Administrative Building. In 1960, the east wing was added and it was made to the Senior Common Room for Staff in 1974. The name of the building remains unchanged until today and it houses the Department of Music at the present.

Old Hall is used to be a residence hall for students. It is divided into three blocks: Lugard Hall, Eliot Hall, and May Hall, which were built in 1913, 1914 and 1915 respectively. All buildings were made of red bricks, three storeys high, with interconnecting stairs and corridors. The university combined the three halls and renamed it Old Hall in 1969. The Lugard Hall was demolished in 1991, the Eliot Hall became the Administrative Building and the May Hall is used for the Office for General Education Unit.

=== Primary and secondary schools ===
St. Paul's College is the oldest school in Hong Kong. It was established in 1851 and celebrated its 155th anniversary in 2006. It was merged with St. Paul's Girls' School and formed St. Paul's Co-educational College, and later returned to being a boys-only college.

Ying Wa Girls' School is a girls' secondary school under the Hong Kong Council of the Church of Christ in China and located at 76 Robinson Road. It was founded by the London Missionary Society in 1900.

Island School is the flagship English Schools Foundation school. It counts among its students many of the expatriate children living in Mid-Levels.

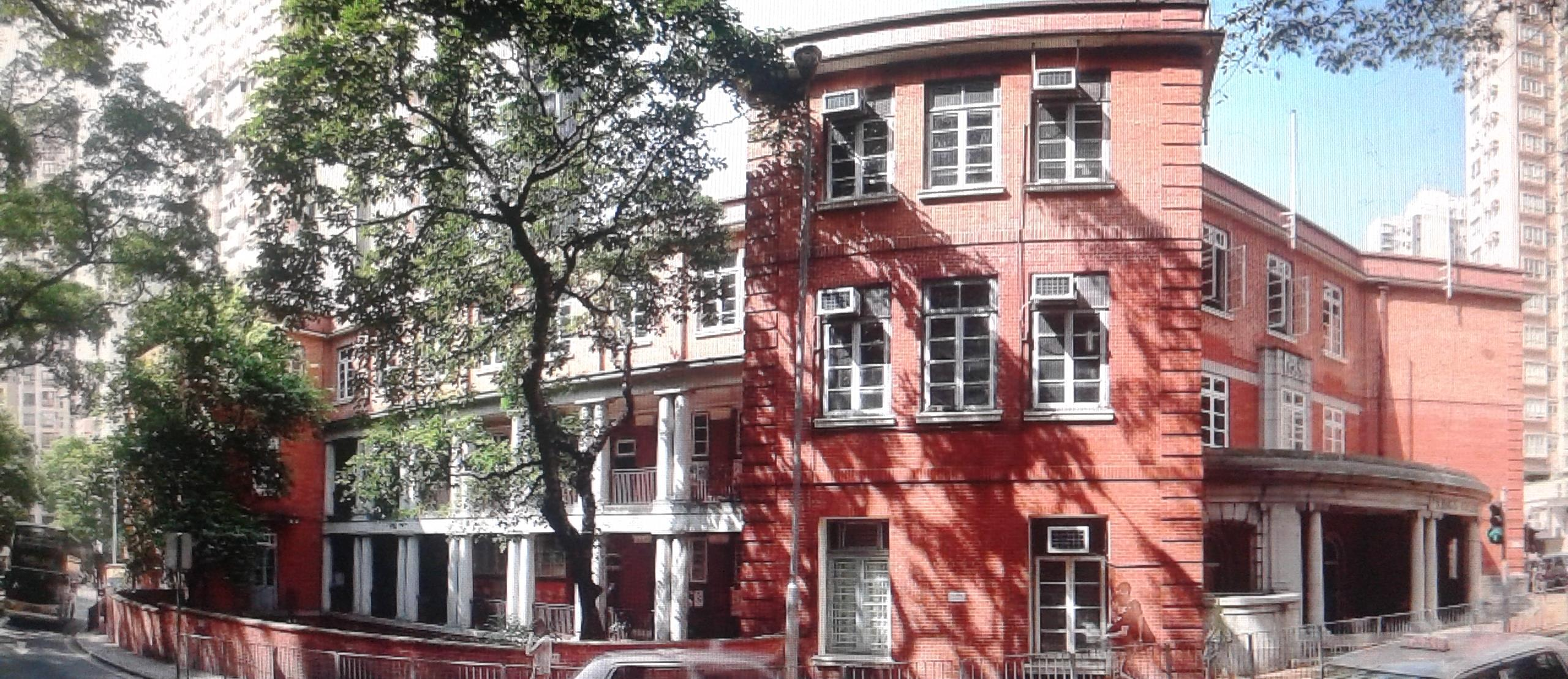
King's College

King's College was previously known as Saiyingpun Anglo-Chinese School in 1879. The British used the school as the quarters and hospital for the British Shanghai Defence Force soon after it opened. In 1928, it was reverted to a school but was turned into a stable in 1941 by the Japanese. It became a school again in 1950 and has remained a government school since then. King's College has been a 'declared monument' of Hong Kong since 2011.

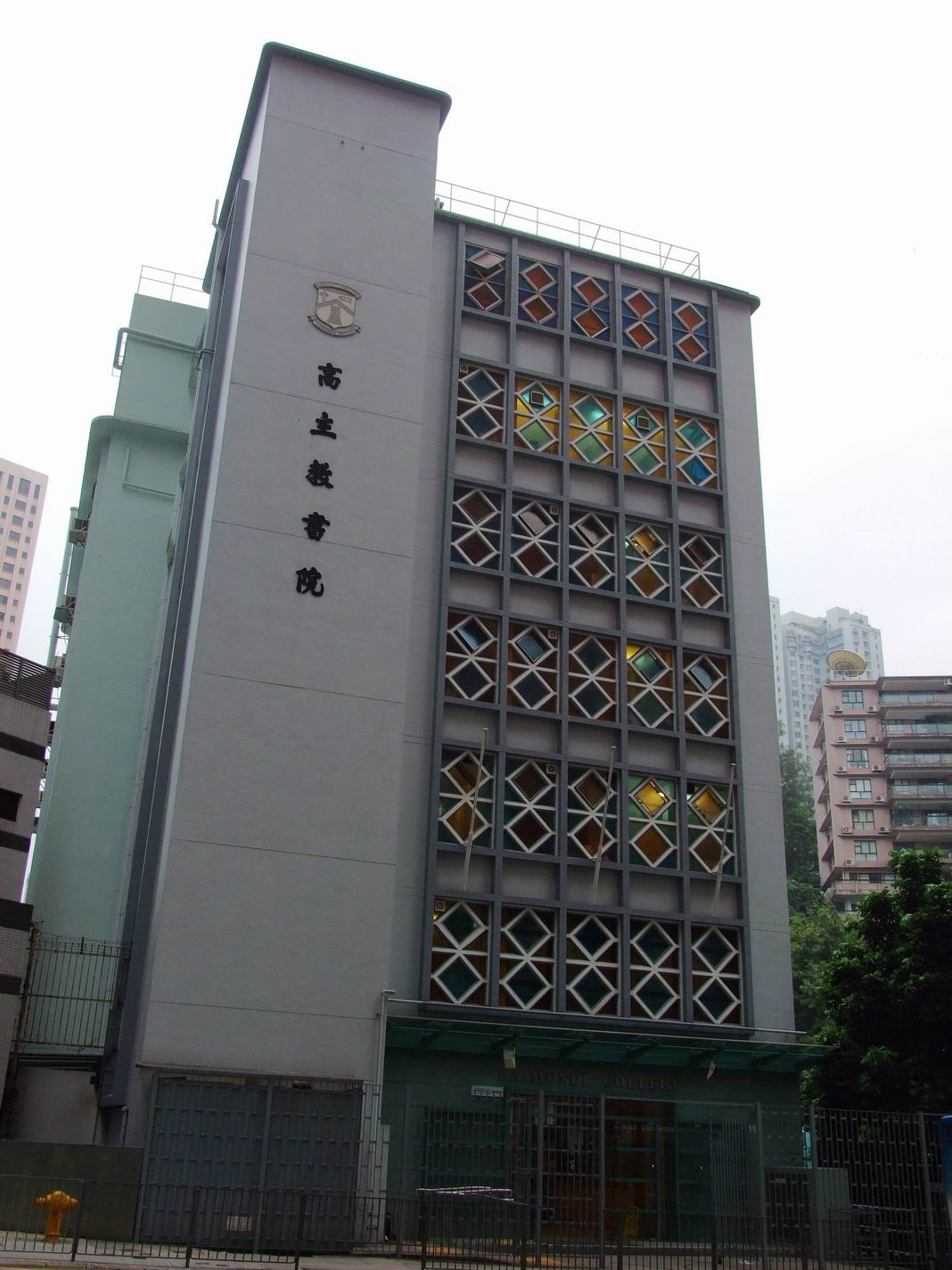
Raimondi College

Raimondi College is a co-educational English-medium secondary school, named after Bishop Timoleon Raimondi, the first vicar apostolic of Hong Kong.

Established in 1875, St. Joseph's College is the first Catholic boys' secondary school in Hong Kong. It is a Lasallian institution. Together with a primary school, St. Joseph's Primary School, the St. Joseph's population now exceeds 4200. The north and west blocks of the college are declared monuments of Hong Kong since August 2000.

St. Margaret's Girls' College H.K. is a girls college in Hong Kong. It was founded in 1964.

St. Paul's Co-educational College was established in 1915 as St. Paul's Girls College. After temporarily merging with St. Paul's College, the school retained its co-educational status. It is one of the first schools to convert to the Direct Subsidy Scheme in 2002, and is introducing an International Baccalaureate curriculum. Currently, the primary school section is no longer housed in the same campus as the secondary school, and has moved to a new campus in Wong Chuk Hang.

== Religious buildings ==
=== Temples ===
Man Mo Temple is a popular site of worship that is important to Hong Kong culture. The Man Mo Temple was founded in the 1850s at the start of British Occupation of Hong Kong and contains a copper bell made during the reign of the Daoguang Emperor (r. 1820–1850) in the Qing dynasty. Man Mo Temple is located at the intersection of Hollywood Road and Ladder Street which is in the area known as Tai Ping Shan rather than the Mid-Levels. In addition, there are many small traditional shrines, often adjacent to old large strangler fig trees.

=== St John's Cathedral ===
St John's Cathedral, an Anglican/Episcopalian church located on Garden Road, is one of the oldest and most active places of worship in Hong Kong. It hosts a counselling service, an HIV centre and two advisory centres for migrant workers who form about 5% of Hong Kong's population. St John's operates an "open altar" policy of welcoming to Holy Communion all Christians in good standing. Hong Kong's lands have a set period of grant on them, and St John's Cathedral's land is the only exception.

=== Roman Catholic Cathedral ===
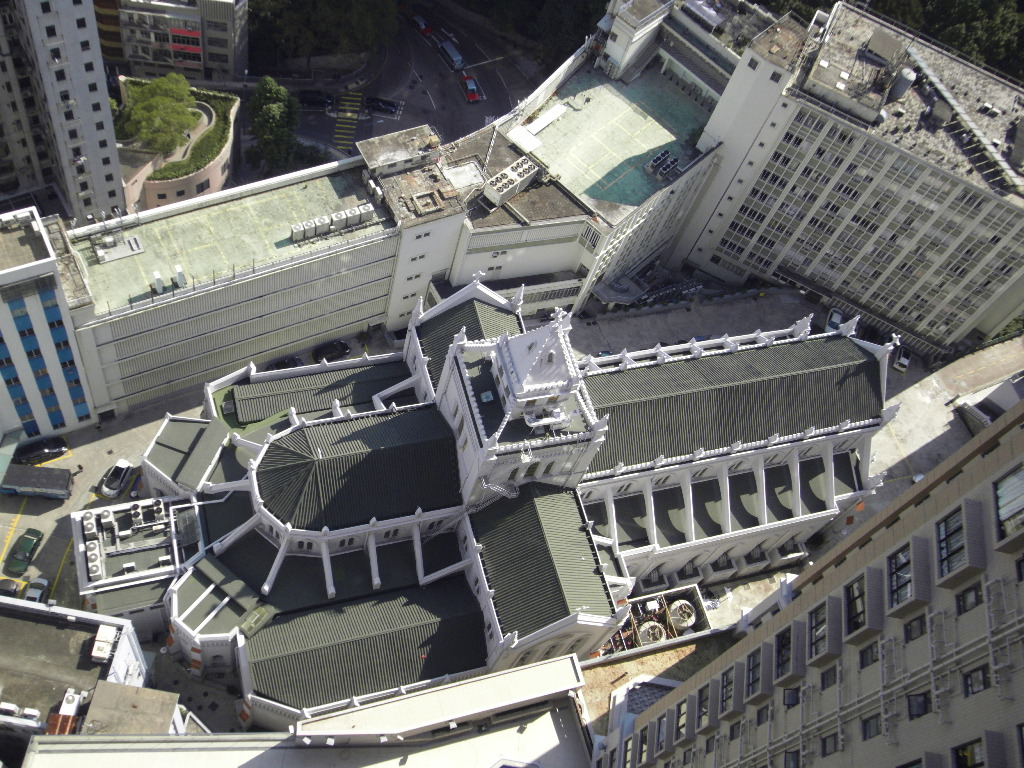
Roman Catholic Cathedral

The Immaculate Conception Cathedral is a Roman Catholic cathedral at 16 Caine Road. The first Roman Catholic cathedral of Hong Kong was built in 1843 and destroyed in a fire in 1859. The cathedral was designed by Crawlwey and Company of London. Construction of the new one started in 1883 and the first Mass was celebrated on 7 December 1888.

=== Union Church Hong Kong ===
The fourth generation building of Union Church Hong Kong was located at Kennedy Road, up the hill from Central and Admiralty, and next to where the Peak Tram bridge intersects with Kennedy Road. Union Church is an international, interdenominational church which was established in 1844. The first Union Church was built in 1845 on Hollywood Road. And then, in 1866, the church relocated to a new site on Staunton Street. Until 1888, due to the church on the Staunton Street had become very crowded, it was moved to the current site on Kennedy Road. Union Church has a long history and during World War II, it was forced to be closed owing to the invasion of the Japanese. On 16 March 2014, the members decided to demolish the church and redevelop its prime real-estate site. The church was finally demolished in 2017. The new church building should be finished towards the end of 2022.

=== Hop Yat Church ===
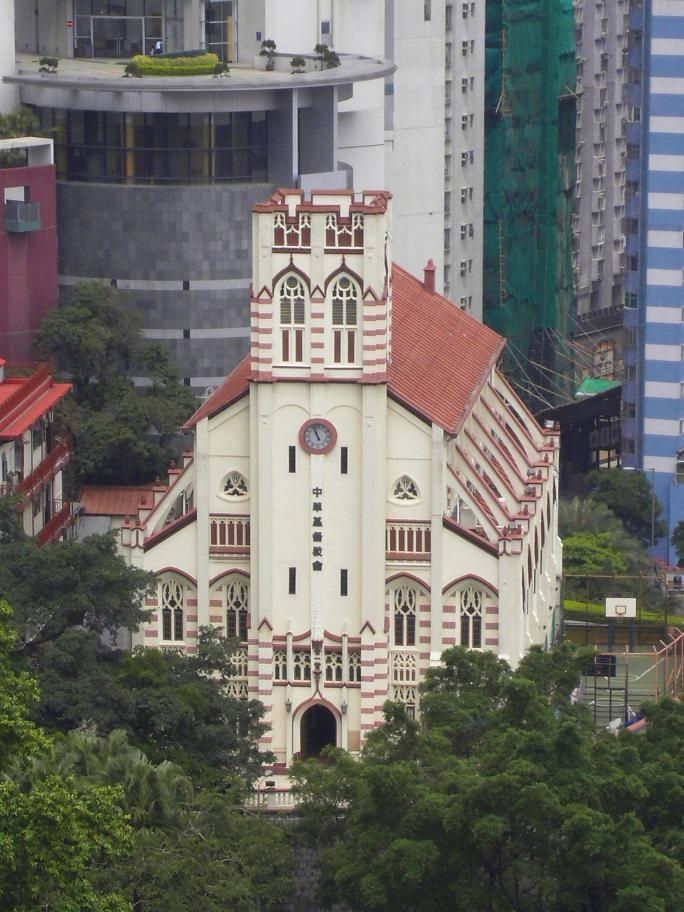
Hop Yat Church, Bonham Road

To Tsai Church (道濟會堂, also known as Daoji Mission House) was founded by the London Missionary Society in 1888 and was located at 75 Hollywood Road. Sun Yat-sen attended this church while he studied medicine in Hong Kong College of Medicine for Chinese. Fung-Chi Au (1847–1914), who was Sun's teacher of Chinese literature and secretary of the Hong Kong Department of Chinese Affairs (香港華民政務司署總書記), was an elder of this church. Due to its growth, this church erected a large building at 2 Bonham Road in 1926 and was renamed Hop Yat Church (合一堂).

=== Jamiah Mosque ===
Jamia Mosque is an elegant old mosque dating from the early days of Hong Kong's history is located on the corner of Mosque Street and Shelley Street. It is easily accessible by the Mid-Levels escalator.

=== Ohel Leah Synagogue and Jewish Cultural Centre ===
Ohel Leah Synagogue

The Ohel Leah Synagogue located on Robinson Road dates from 1901.

=== Hong Kong Baptist Church ===
The Hong Kong Baptist Church is on 50 Caine Road and has about 2,200 regular worshipers. It was established in 1901. It acquired 97 Caine Road in February 2015 for expansion purposes.

=== Missionaries ===
The London Mission Building is at 78–80 Robinson Road.

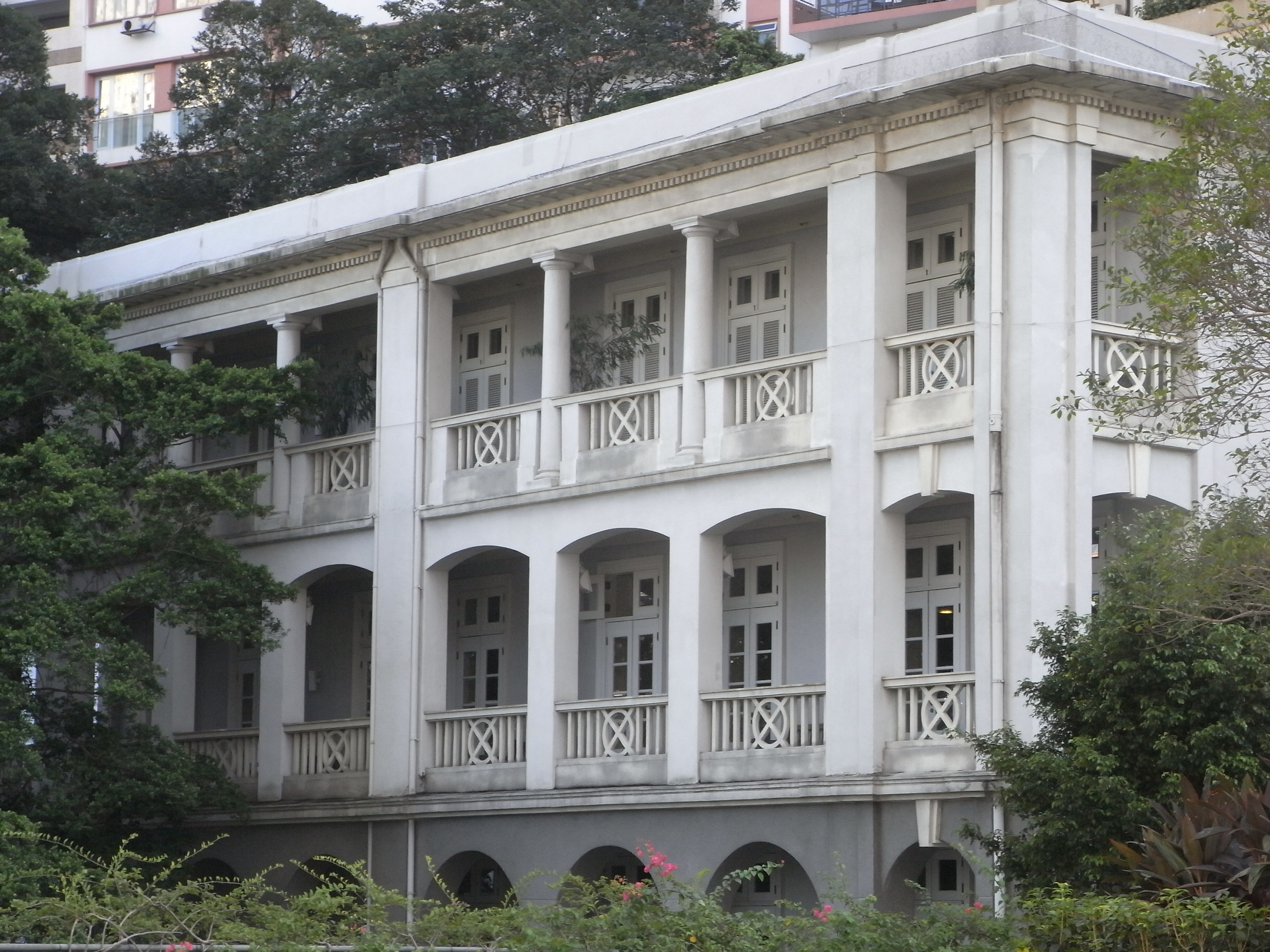
London Mission Building, 78–80 Robinson Road, Photographed in 2010

== Housing ==
=== Private housing ===
39 Conduit Road is a residential property developed by Henderson Land Development. Soon after the development was launched in October 2009, the developer claimed to have sold a five-bedroom duplex flat, on the "68th floor" of the 46-storey building for HK$439 million (US$57m). The price, US$9,200 per square foot, set a new world record for the most expensive apartment.

=== Mid-Levels moratorium ===
A moratorium to restrict development in Mid-Levels was established in 1972 to limit traffic. Of the 420 plots of land in Mid-Levels, 4 government sites and 43 private sites are subject to the moratorium. Twenty-six sites are reserved for government and community use, and the remaining 347 plots are not subject to the moratorium.

=== Height restrictions ===
In 2008, new restrictions were imposed in the area, capping residential buildings at a maximum of 115 meters in height. Several residential buildings were pre-approved to escape the restriction, including Alassio, Arezzo, the Merry Terrace redevelopment, and the Seymour building.

== See also ==
- List of places in Hong Kong
- List of tallest buildings in Hong Kong
