= Kotewall Road =

Street in Mid-Levels, Hong Kong

Coordinates: 22.28124°N 114.14111°E

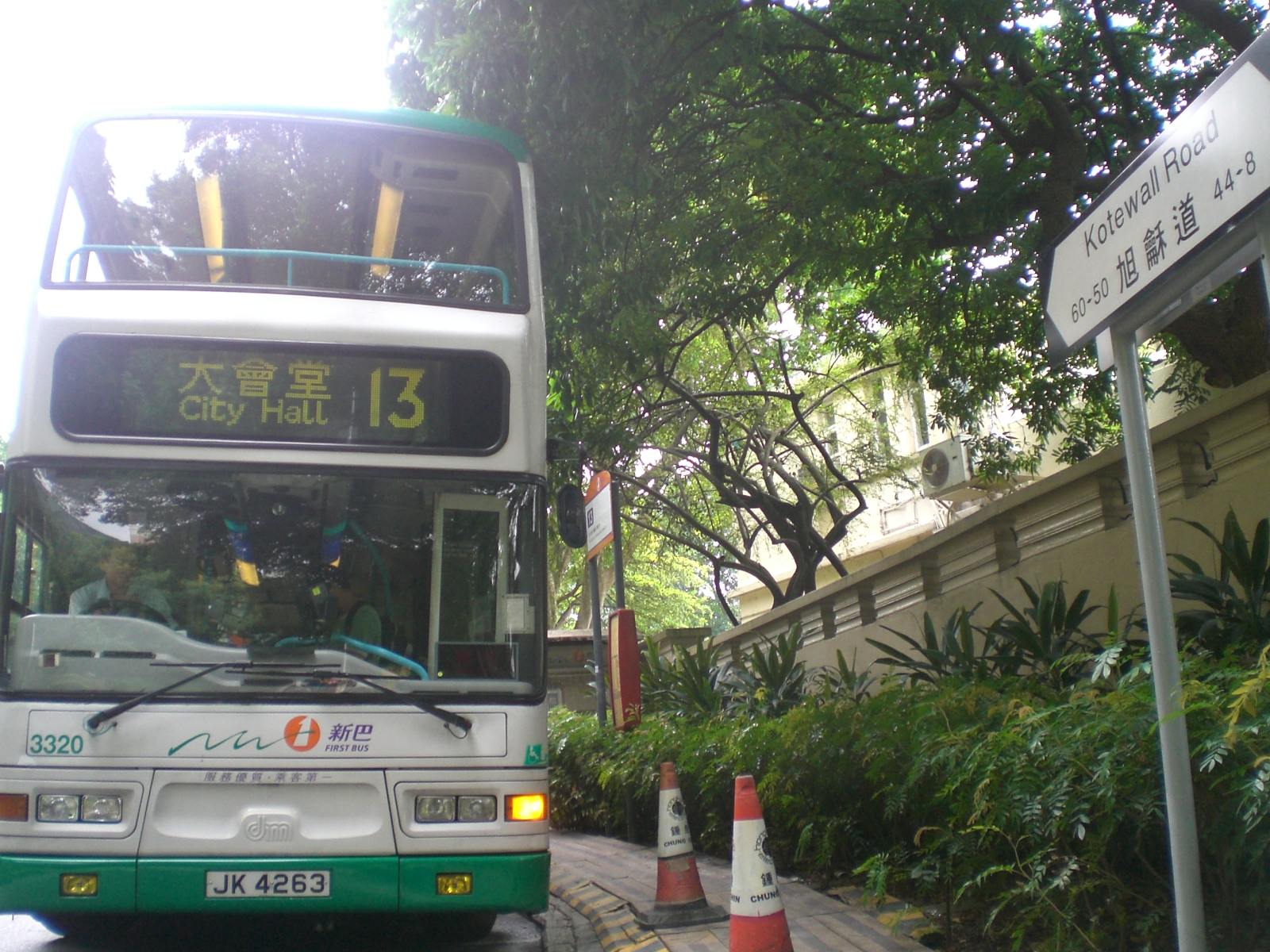
A bus stop on the Road

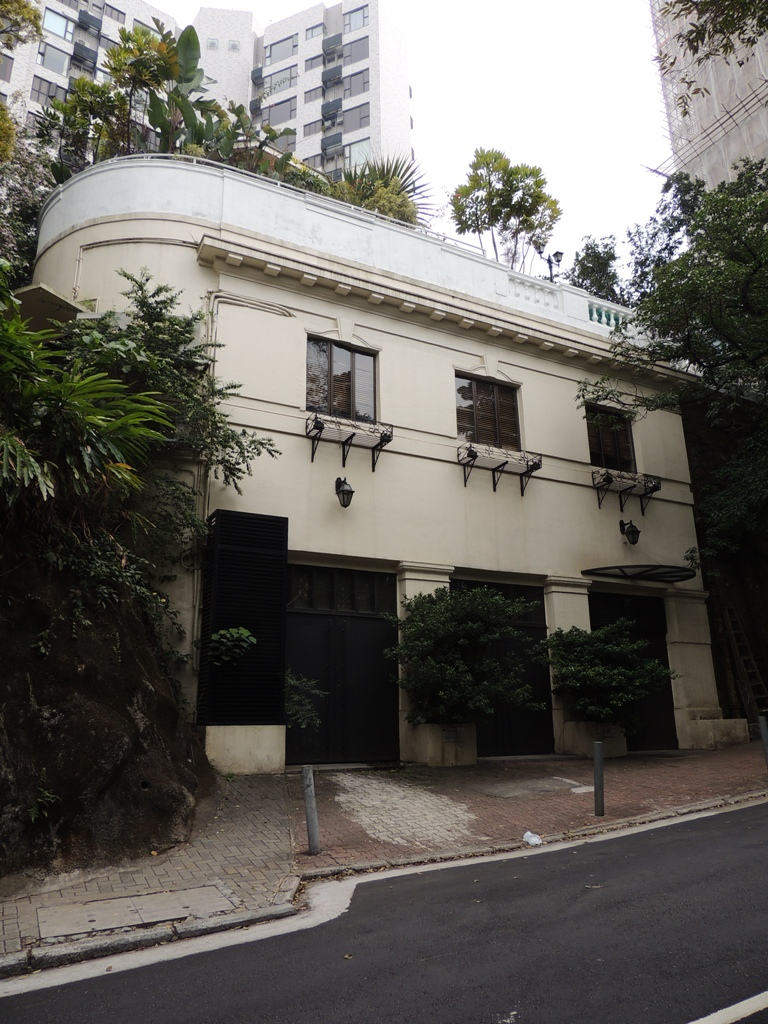
Stone House, at No. 15 Kotewall Road

Kotewall Road (Chinese: 旭龢道) is a street in Mid-Levels, Hong Kong Island, Hong Kong, located between Po Shan Road and Robinson Road. It is a 400-metre-long two-way road located on hill slopes south of Sai Ying Pun.

== Name ==
The road was named after Sir Robert Hormus Kotewall, a prominent indian chinese businessman and legislator during the colonial era, who built the road in the 1910s.

== History ==
Kotewall Road was once known for its concentration of vehicle-repairing garages, mainly servicing the wealthy residents of Mid-Levels. Stone House, a Grade III historic building built in 1923 at 15 Kotewall Road is the only garage of this kind remaining, now turned into a private residence.

== Nearby places ==
- University of Hong Kong
- University Drive

== See also ==
- 1972 Hong Kong landslides
