= Kam Sheung Road =

Road in Hong Kong

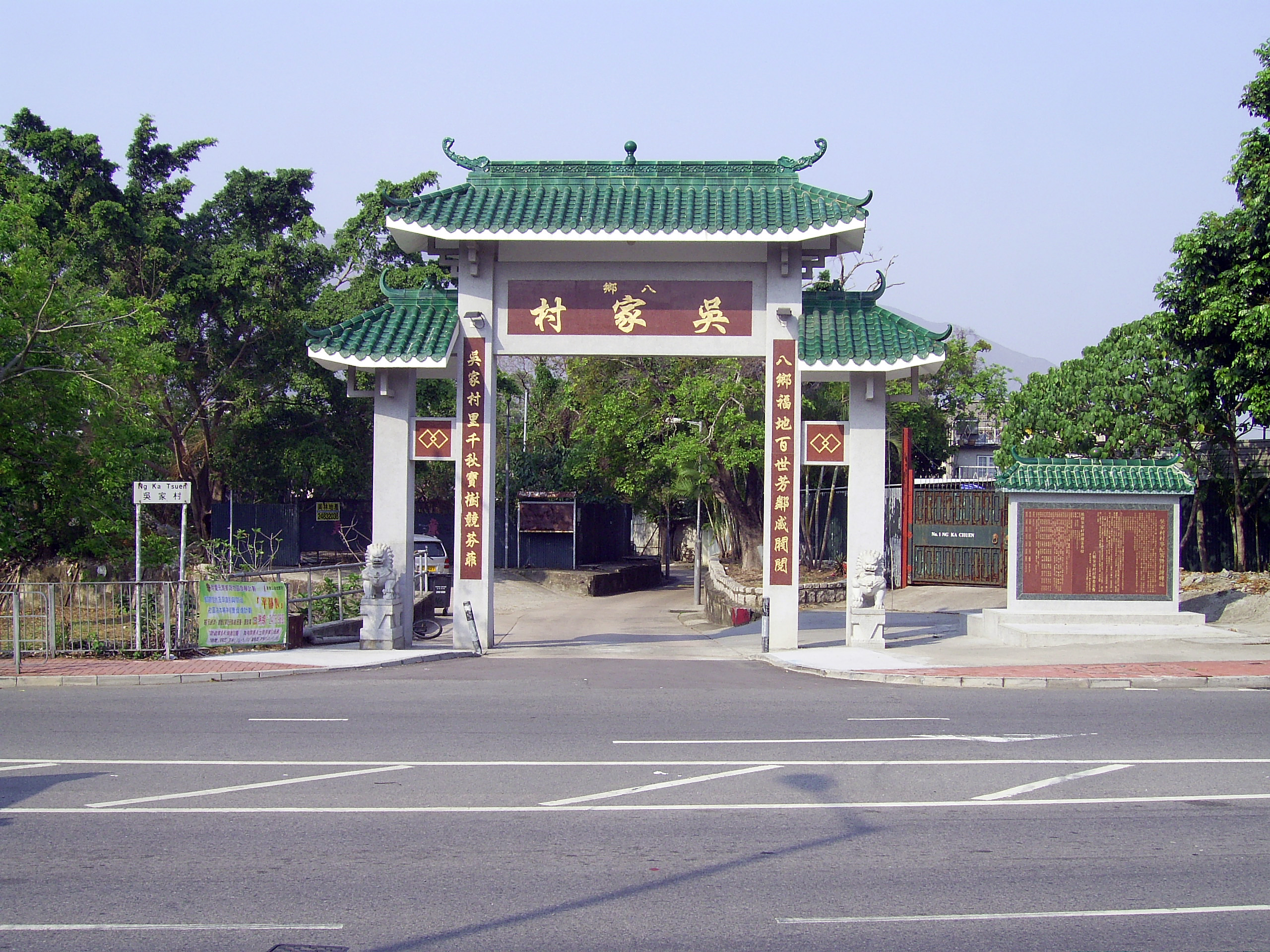
Paifang of Ng Ka Tsuen along Kam Sheung Road

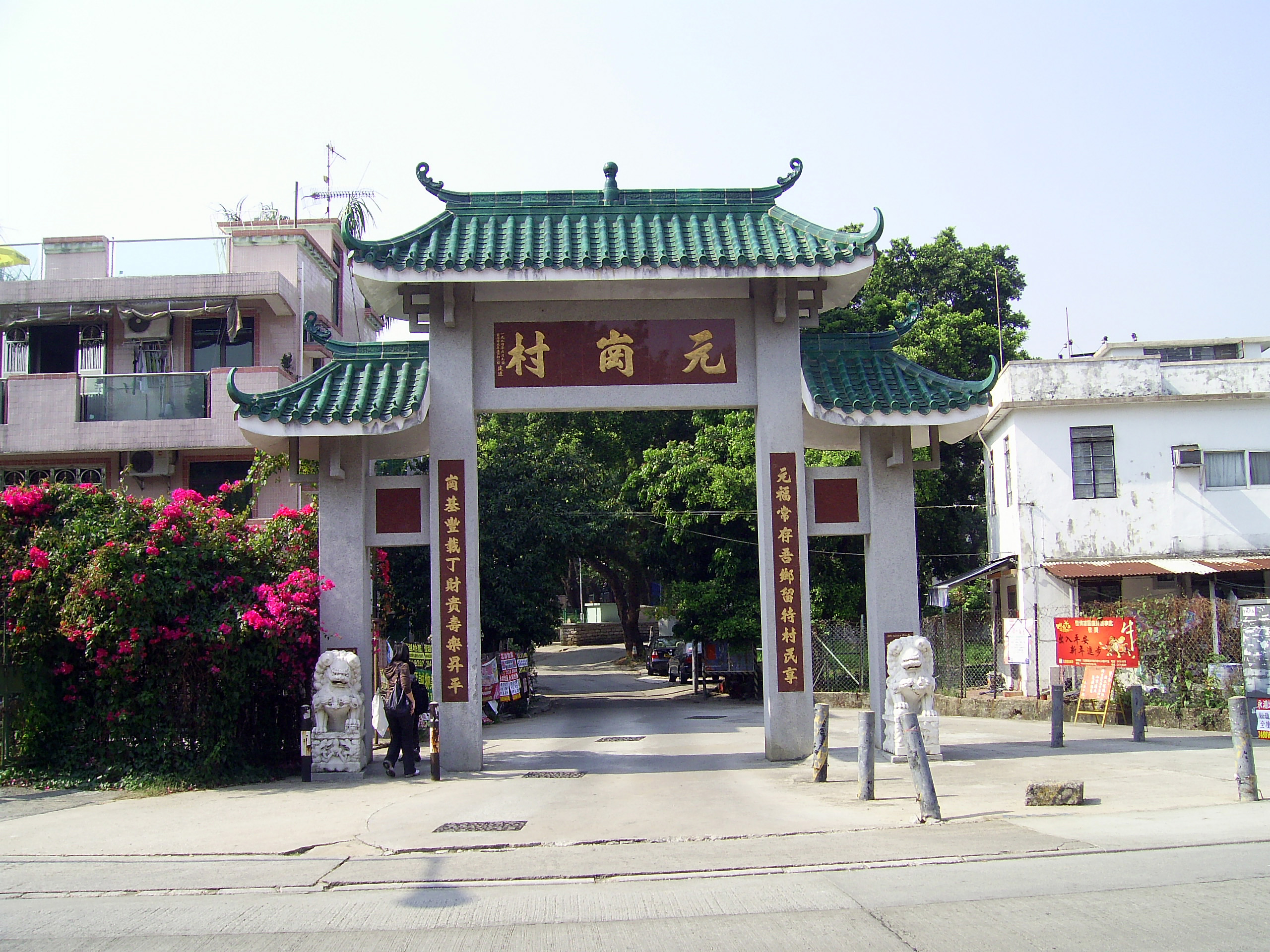
Paifang of Yuen Kong Tsuen along Kam Sheung Road

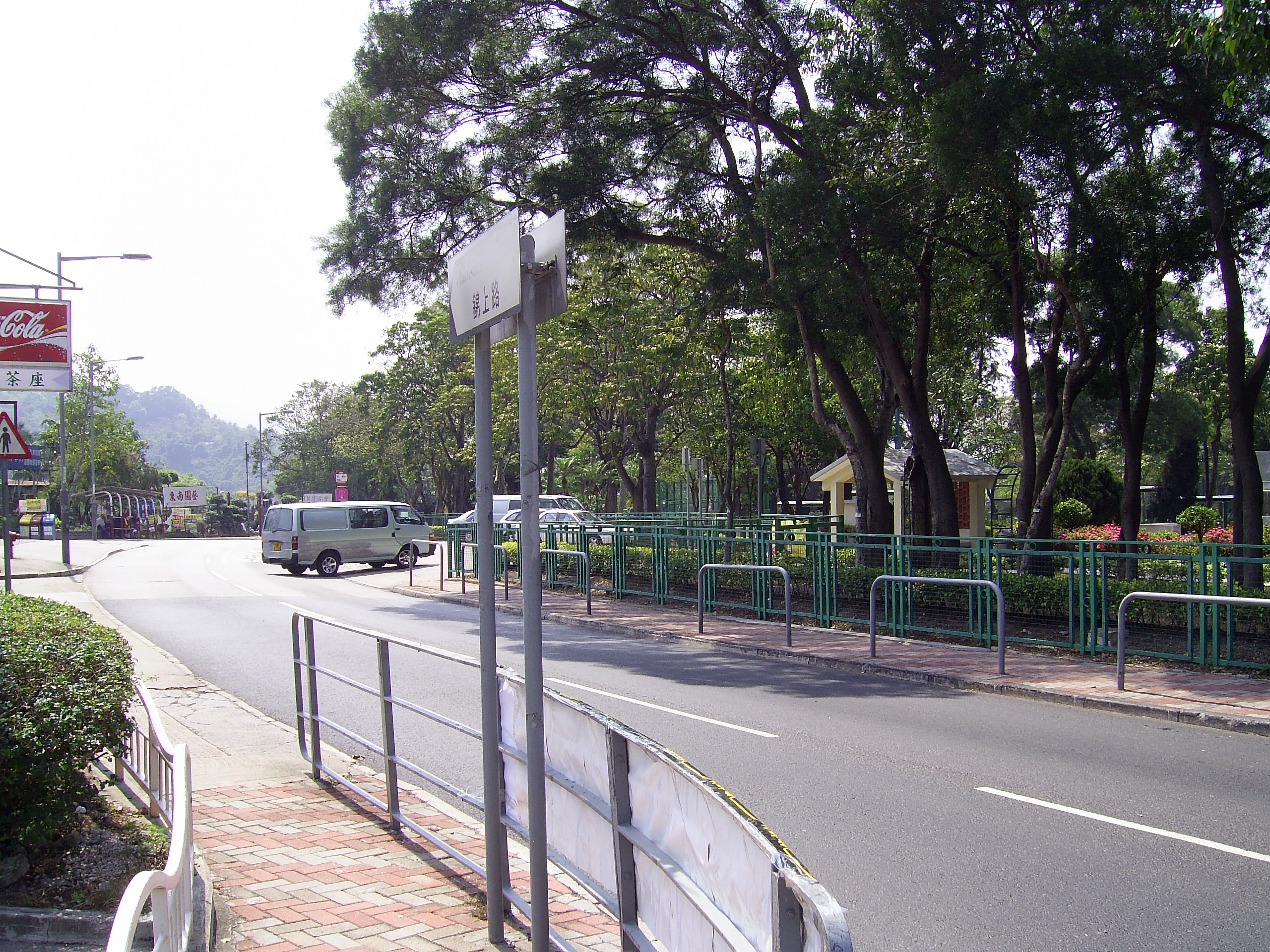
Eastern end of Kam Sheung Road, looking west

Kam Sheung Road (Chinese: 錦上路) is one of the main roads in Pat Heung, Yuen Long District, New Territories, Hong Kong. It connects Kam Tin to Sheung Tsuen, hence the name of the road. The road is 5.5 km long and was opened to traffic in January 1962.

== Features ==
The road starts from Kam Tin Road near the junction with Kam Tin Shi Street in the west, and ends at the end of Kam Tin Road near Sheung Tsuen Park in the east, near the junction of Lam Kam Road and Route Twisk, passing through many densely populated villages, such as Tsz Tong Tsuen (祠堂村), Ng Ka Tsuen (吳家村), Shek Wu Tong (石湖塘), Tai Wo Tsuen (大窩村), Yuen Kong Tsuen (元崗村), Shui Tsan Tin (水盞田), Ngau Keng Tsuen (牛徑村), Lin Fa Tei (蓮花地), Lai Uk Tsuen (黎屋村), Tsang Uk Tsuen (曾屋村), Tse Uk Tsuen (謝屋村), and Sheung Tsuen San Tsuen (上村新村).

Many village houses and new-style residential buildings have been developed on both sides of Kam Sheung Road. Famous places include Kam Tin Red Brick House (錦田紅磚屋), Japanese Chiba Garden (日本千葉園), Lai Mansion (黎氏大屋), Chik Kwai Study Hall (植桂書室).

== Scenic spots ==
=== Chik Kwai Study Hall ===
Chik Kwai Study Hall was built in the late Qing Dynasty and funded by Lai Kam Tai (黎金泰), a member of the Lai clan in Pat Heung (八鄉). It is a traditional Lingnan building with two entrances, three bays and a courtyard (兩進三開間一天井). The study hall still preserves a large number of original architectural components and decorations, including finely hand-crafted wood carvings, stone carvings, vivid plaster sculptures on the roof and gables, and lifelike murals on the walls, which are in line with the characteristics and aesthetics of traditional Lingnan architecture.

=== Lai Mansion ===
The Lai mansion was not completed until 1919, at least 20 years later than the Study. By then, Lai had died and the mansion was left to his four sons. The mansion is quite grand, with two entrances, three bays and a courtyard.

=== Kam Tin Red Brick House ===
The red brick flea market in Kam Tin, which was converted from a candle factory, has been rooted in Kam Tin for twelve years and has become one of Kam Tin's landmark buildings. It is located next to the Tsz Tong Tsuen and close to Kat Hing Wai. It is a tourist attraction in Hong Kong. It covers an area of 20,000 square feet and all of the 52 shops inside are small shops built with red bricks.

=== Kam Sheung Road Station Flea Market ===
There is a flea market around Kam Sheung Road, located in the open space next to Kam Sheung Road station. The market is hosted by MTR and officially opened on 1 May 2008.
