= Lui Kung Tin =

Coordinates: 22.42589°N 114.10538°E

Lui Kung Tin 雷公田
- Interactive map of Lui Kung Tin

Lui Kung Tin (Chinese: 雷公田) is an area with a village of same name in Pat Heung, Yuen Long District, Hong Kong.

The area of Lui Kung Tin is sometimes mistakenly identified as Shek Kong because of the name of Shek Kong Village while the proper Shek Kong location is at Shek Kong Barracks and Shek Kong Airfield, west of Lui Kung Tin, across Sheung Tsuen and Lin Fa Tei.

== Name ==
Lui Kung Tin is a Cantonese transcription of native writing 雷公田, which literally means thunder-god and paddy field. In Hong Kong, paddy field as place name was quite common as majority of villagers were growing rice for livelihood. For thunder, one etymological explanation is that the orographic precipitation by the height of Tai Mo Shan frequently gathers rainstorms accompanying with thunders.

== History ==
On the western slope of Tai Mo Shan, the original Hakka village of Leung clan, in Cantonese 梁, of Lui Kung Tin was demolished around 1957 when military quarters of Shek Kong Village were built. Actually some villagers relocated themselves to Leung Uk Tsuen in Wang Toi Shan in 1940s and finally all relocated before the village demolished in 1950s. Meanwhile a new non-indigenous villages Lui Kung Tin was formed by different clans which finally became a member of Pat Heung Rural Committee in 1991.

== Transportation ==
The Kap Lung Ancient Trail (甲龍古道) was historically the main route taken by farmers in the vicinity of Pat Heung, Shek Kong and Lui Kung Tin for selling their produce in the markets in Tsuen Wan.

Route Twisk, connecting Sheung Tsuen and Tsuen Wan, is the major access to the area.
