= Shek Kong =

Coordinates: 22°26′23″N 114°04′44″E

Shek Kong 石崗
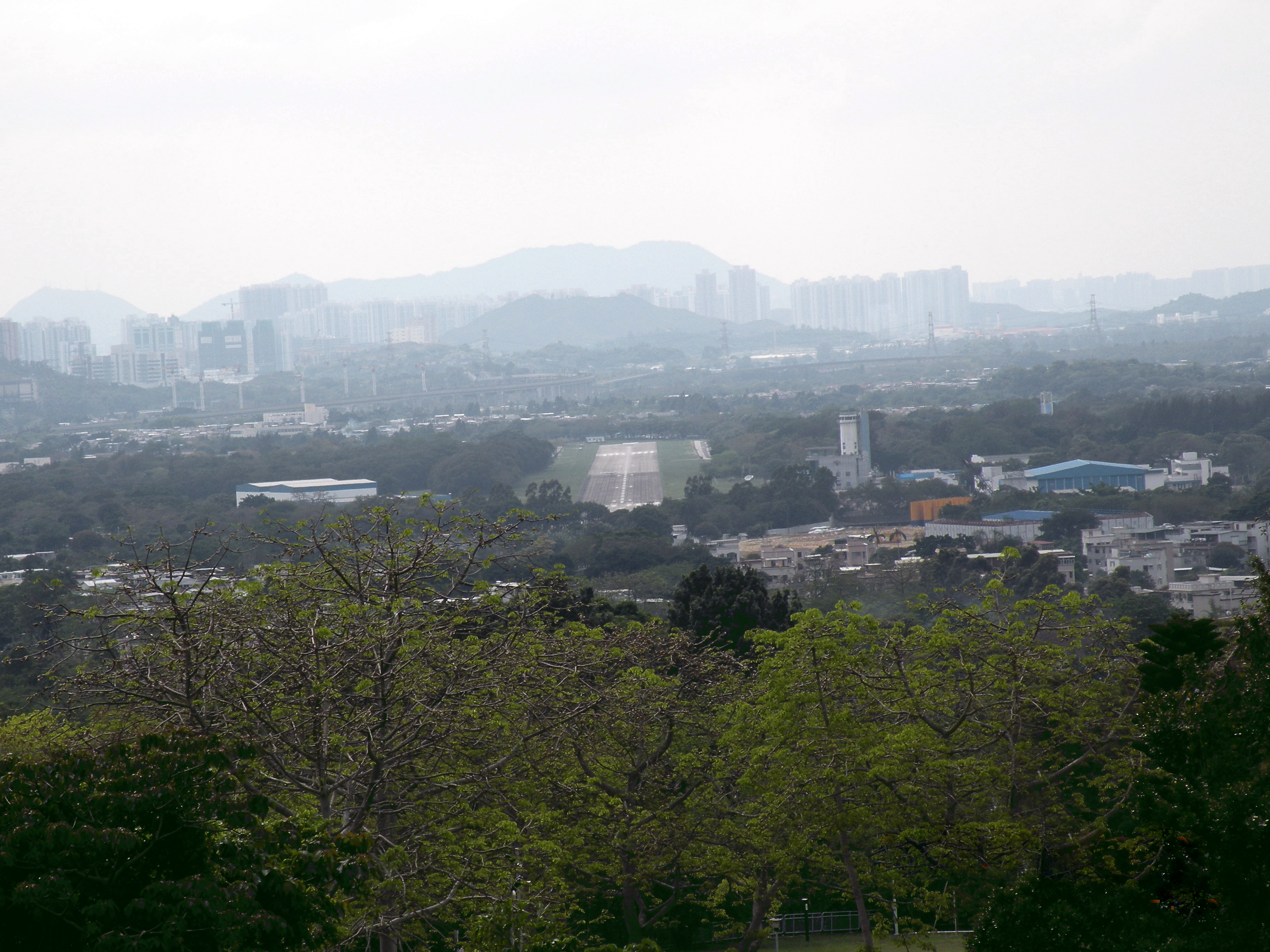
- Shek Kong Airfield
- Interactive map of Shek Kong

Shek Kong
- Traditional Chinese: 石崗
- Simplified Chinese: 石岗
Transcriptions
Standard Mandarin
- Hanyu Pinyin: Shígāng
Yue: Cantonese
- Yale Romanization: Sehkgōng
- Jyutping: Sek6gong1

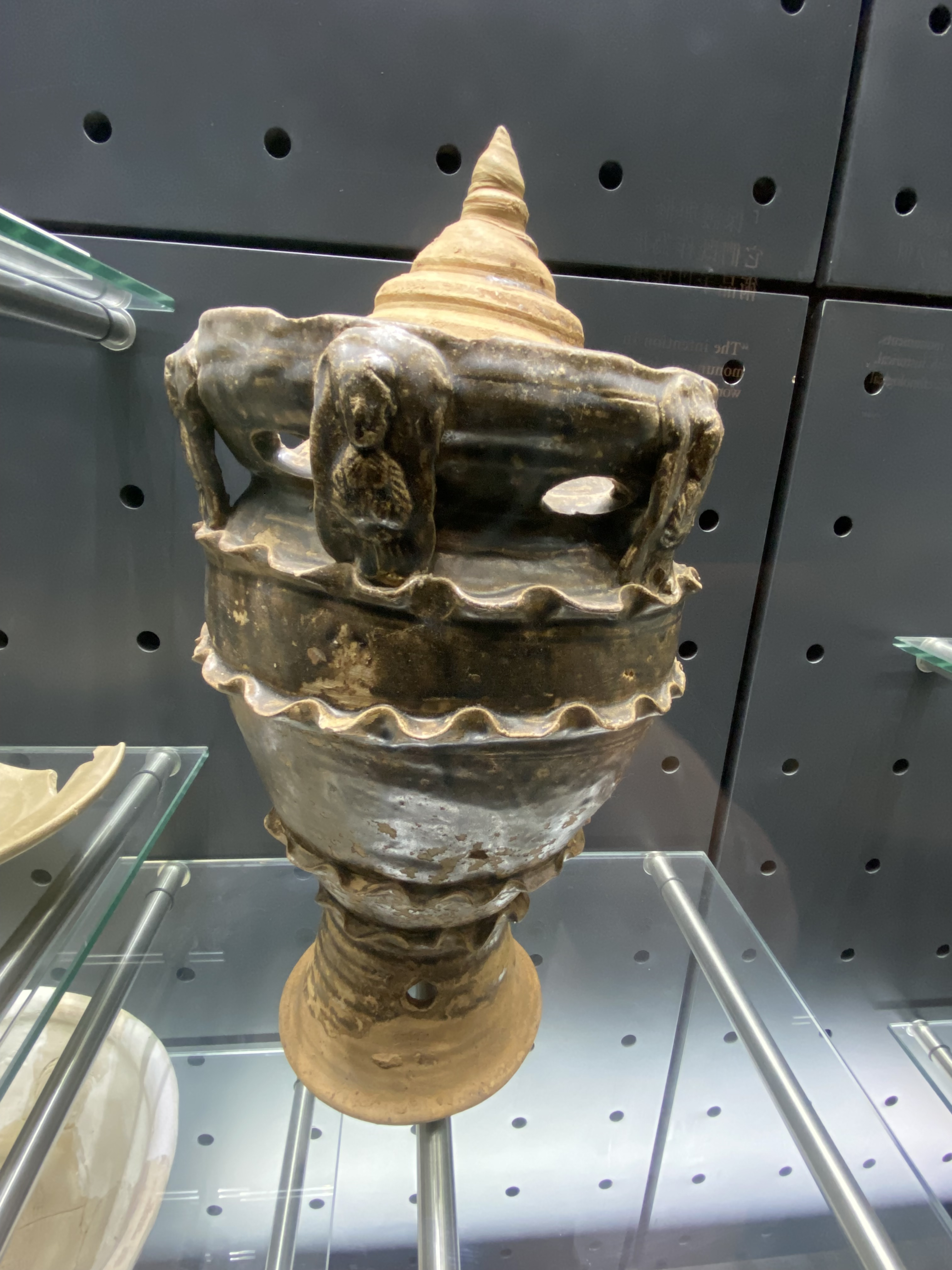
Pottery burial jar of Song Dynasty unearthed in Shek Kong Airfield

Shek Kong is an area north of Tai Mo Shan, located near Kam Tin and Pat Heung, in Yuen Long District, New Territories, Hong Kong, hosting Shek Kong San Tsuen, Shek Kong Barracks and Shek Kong Airfield.

The area named after an old walled village of Shek Kong on the south side of north tributary of Kam Tin River, predating New Territories of 1898. The village was demolished in late-1940s for the setup of Shek Kong Camp, south of Kam Tin Road. Shek Kong is Cantonese phonetic transcription of native writing 石崗 that means a rocky mount. Its history was much longer as pots from Tang dynasty and Song dynasty were unearthed in Shek Kong.

The barracks and airfield occupied the largest area of Shek Kong, flattening the landscape and re-channelling of south tributary of Kam Tin River. The runway serves both military for helicopters and civilian to fly aeroplane for leisure.

There are military quarters Shek Kong Village, built in 1957, not in Shek Kong but far on the slope of and original village of Lui Kung Tin along Route Twisk. The village was originally for the married members of Shek Kong Camp/Barracks. The naming causes confusion afterwards to the location of Shek Kong and gives an illusion that Shek Kong has a vast portion of Pat Heung, including Lin Fa Tei and Sheung Tsuen, between Shek Kong Barracks/Airfield and Shek Kong Village. Some even tried to identify the rocky mount as Kwun Yam Shan which far from Shek Kong.

A sizable Nepal Gurkha population is present in the area and adjacent area of Kam Tin and Pat Heung even after the withdrawal of British military and many of them are moved to various area in Yuen Long District such as Yuen Long, and even more to Kwun Chung in Kowloon.

== History ==
The original walled village of Shek Kong, of Chau/Chow family, 周 in Cantonese, was in the present location of Shek Kong Barracks, just south of Kam Tin Road, predating the extension to the New Territories of Hong Kong in 1898. A map for the extension named the village Shek Kong in 1904 although earlier map of 1901 mapped it without name.

It was quite common conflicts between villages became a clan war in southern China. In 1935, there was a brief one between Shek Kong and Kam Tin, even villagers of both villages had lot of marriages among themselves. The shortage of water made farming difficult. A villager of Kam Tin broke the embankment of a paddle field of Shek Kong to release water to their own paddy fields. It soon evolved into a small clan war by calling members of their own clan and was soon stopped by the local police force. Some fled, some were taken to Kowloon Hospital and some were taken to Au Tau Police Station. This is one of early record of Shek Kong.

In 1938, an airfield, by flattening the land, was built around the village to defence against the Japanese advance to Kwangtung but soon converted to refugee camp when people fled from the Japanese aggression in Shanghai and northern China. Japanese war map of 1939 named it in Chinese character 錦田飛行場, namely Kam Tin Airfield. The airfield rendered useless during Japanese occupation of Hong Kong between late-1941 and mid-1945 and returned to cultivation owing to food shortage.

The original village was removed when Shek Kong Camp, later known as Shek Kong Barracks, was built around 1949, guarding then British colony of Hong Kong against the advance to Sham Chun, nowadays Shenzhen, of newly established communist China. A new village Shek Kong San Tsuen was at the northwest of the original village, on the opposite side of the road few years later.

The airfield became a base of Royal Air Force of the United Kingdom in 1950 and it was transferred to People's Liberation Army Air Force of China in 1997 when the sovereignty of Hong Kong was changed. In 1975 following the Fall of Saigon a refugee camp was set for Vietnamese refugee in the airfield. And again in 1980, with influx of Vietnamese boat people a detention camp was set in the airfield. The operation from then was with helicopter and closing of runway was not a problem. The airfield was open to civilian use in the weekends and the Hong Kong Aviation Club was based in the airfield.

British forces built some quarters for the families of garrison of the camp around 1957, on hilly slope of Lui Kung Tin, adjacent to Route Twisk, east of but far from the camp. The quarters was named as Shek Kong Families' Village and later known as Shek Kong Village. This sometimes causes confusion to the location of Shek Kong.

The basin of Kam Tin and Pat Heung was long inhibited with known record of the ancestors of Kam Tin villages living in the basin as early as 973 and settled in 1105 during Song dynasty. But a pottery burial jar of earlier Tang dynasty was unearthed in Shek Kong, together with some of Song dynasty.

== Climate ==
Climate data for Shek Kong (1997–2020)
Month	Jan	Feb	Mar	Apr	May	Jun	Jul	Aug	Sep	Oct	Nov	Dec	Year
Record high °C (°F)	28.4 (83.1)	30.5 (86.9)	30.8 (87.4)	33.1 (91.6)	34.4 (93.9)	36.4 (97.5)	37.3 (99.1)	37.2 (99.0)	35.9 (96.6)	34.2 (93.6)	32.3 (90.1)	29.6 (85.3)	37.3 (99.1)
Mean daily maximum °C (°F)	20.0 (68.0)	21.4 (70.5)	23.9 (75.0)	27.1 (80.8)	30.0 (86.0)	31.6 (88.9)	32.5 (90.5)	32.6 (90.7)	31.6 (88.9)	29.2 (84.6)	25.7 (78.3)	21.5 (70.7)	27.3 (81.1)
Daily mean °C (°F)	15.5 (59.9)	17.2 (63.0)	19.7 (67.5)	23.2 (73.8)	26.4 (79.5)	28.1 (82.6)	28.7 (83.7)	28.5 (83.3)	27.5 (81.5)	25.1 (77.2)	21.5 (70.7)	16.9 (62.4)	23.2 (73.8)
Mean daily minimum °C (°F)	12.0 (53.6)	13.7 (56.7)	16.5 (61.7)	20.1 (68.2)	23.5 (74.3)	25.4 (77.7)	25.7 (78.3)	25.3 (77.5)	24.5 (76.1)	21.9 (71.4)	18.0 (64.4)	13.1 (55.6)	20.0 (68.0)
Record low °C (°F)	1.9 (35.4)	3.1 (37.6)	6.8 (44.2)	10.8 (51.4)	15.9 (60.6)	19.2 (66.6)	21.7 (71.1)	21.7 (71.1)	17.6 (63.7)	12.5 (54.5)	5.8 (42.4)	2.5 (36.5)	1.9 (35.4)
Average precipitation mm (inches)	36.8 (1.45)	34.2 (1.35)	59.3 (2.33)	137.8 (5.43)	281.8 (11.09)	424.8 (16.72)	312.7 (12.31)	342.0 (13.46)	262.6 (10.34)	74.7 (2.94)	32.3 (1.27)	32.4 (1.28)	2,031.4 (79.97)
Average relative humidity (%)	72.9	75.6	77.6	79.3	81.8	82.8	82.2	81.8	78.9	73.4	72.7	69.9	77.4
Source: Hong Kong Observatory (precipitation 1998-2020)

== Education ==
Shek Kong is in Primary One Admission (POA) School Net 74. Within the school net are multiple aided schools (operated independently but funded with government money) and one government school: Yuen Long Government Primary School (元朗官立小學).
