= Tin Sam Tsuen =

Tin Sam Tsuen or Tin Sam Village (Chinese: 田心村), sometimes transliterated as Tin Sum Tsuen, is the name of several villages in Hong Kong:

- Tin Sam Tsuen, Islands District, in Islands District
- Tin Sam Tsuen, North District, in Fanling, North District
- Tin Sam Tsuen, Sha Tin District, in Tai Wai, Sha Tin District
- Tin Sam Tsuen, Tai Po District, in Fung Yuen, Tai Po District
- Tin Sam Tsuen, Hung Shui Kiu, in Hung Shui Kiu, Yuen Long District
- Tin Sam Tsuen, Pat Heung, in Pat Heung, Yuen Long District
