= Tsat Sing Kong =

Coordinates: 22.447678°N 114.082188°E

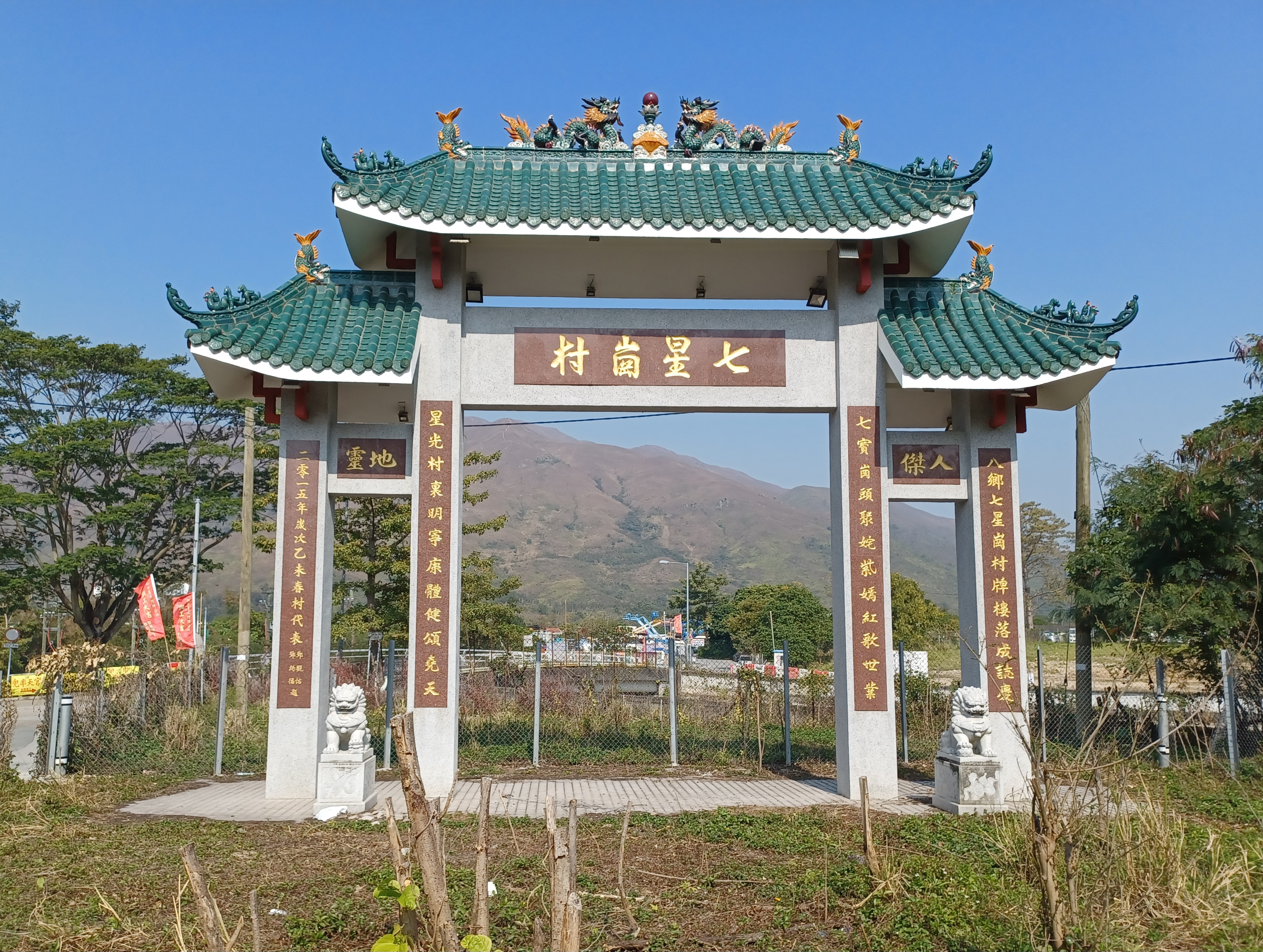
Paifang of Tsat Sing Kong Tsuen.

Tsat Sing Kong (Chinese: 七星崗) is a village in Pat Heung, Yuen Long District, Hong Kong.

== Administration ==
Tsat Sing Kong is a recognized village under the New Territories Small House Policy.

== Features ==
In October 2022, construction commenced in the village on a Transitional housing project (temporary housing for the homeless set up to transition residents into permanent, affordable housing) to build about 909 units for approximately 2,082 residents.
