= Ha Che =

Village in Pat Heung, Hong Kong

Coordinates: 22.449127°N 114.093804°E

Ha Che (Chinese: 下輋) is a village in Pat Heung, Yuen Long District, Hong Kong.

== Administration ==
Ha Che is a recognized village under the New Territories Small House Policy.

== History ==
At the time of the 1911 census, the population of Ha Che was 234. The number of males was 109.
