= Leung Uk Tsuen =

Coordinates: 22.440175°N 114.088818°E

Leung Uk Tsuen (Chinese: 梁屋村) is a village in Pat Heung, Yuen Long District, Hong Kong.

== Administration ==
Leung Uk Tsuen is a recognized village under the New Territories Small House Policy.
