= Ta Shek Wu =

Coordinates: 22.462431°N 114.107441°E

Ta Shek Wu (Chinese: 打石湖) is a village in Pat Heung, Yuen Long District, Hong Kong.

== Administration ==
Ta Shek Wu is a recognized village under the New Territories Small House Policy.
