= Tai Kong Po =

Coordinates: 22.446936°N 114.075621°E

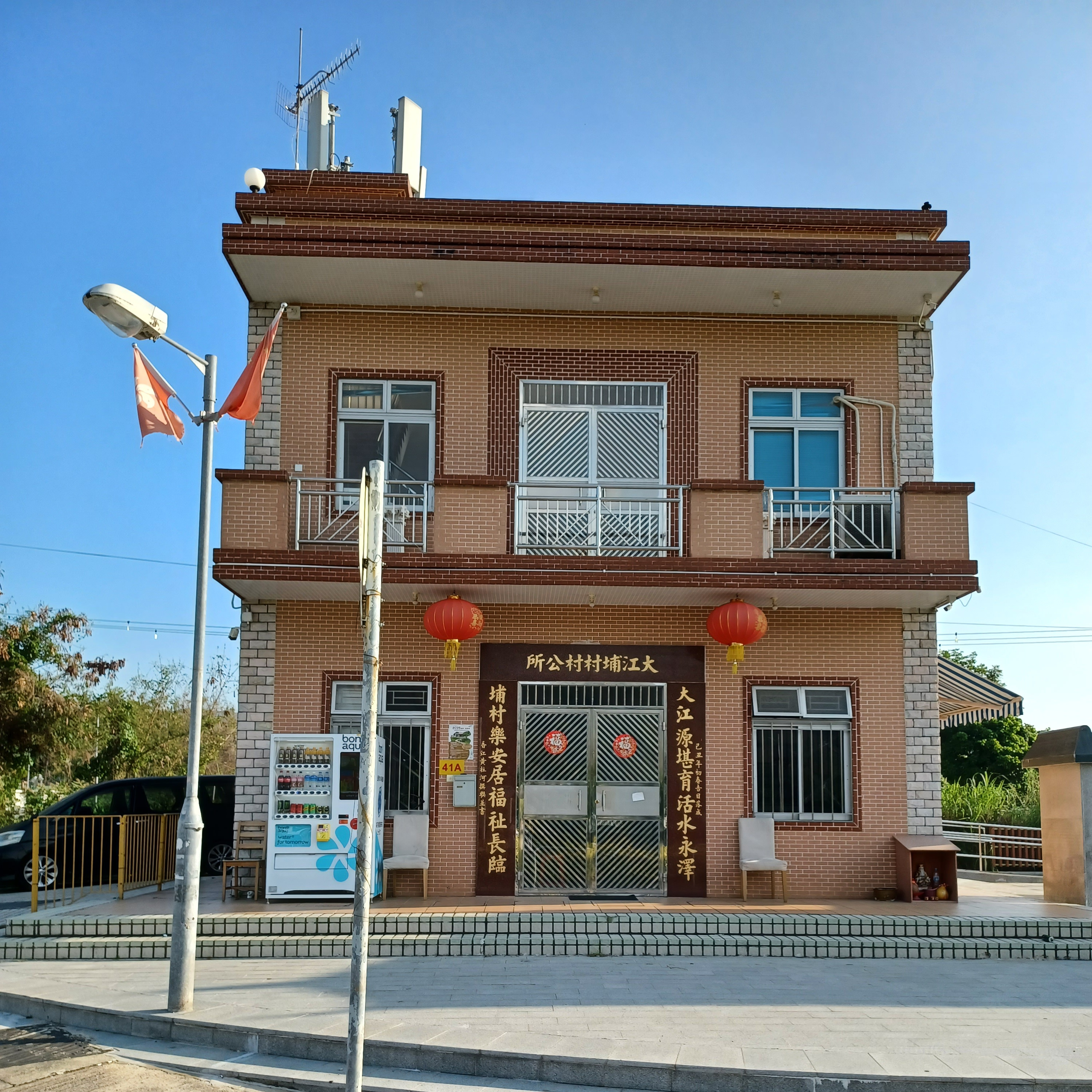
Tai Kong Po Village Office in April 2022.

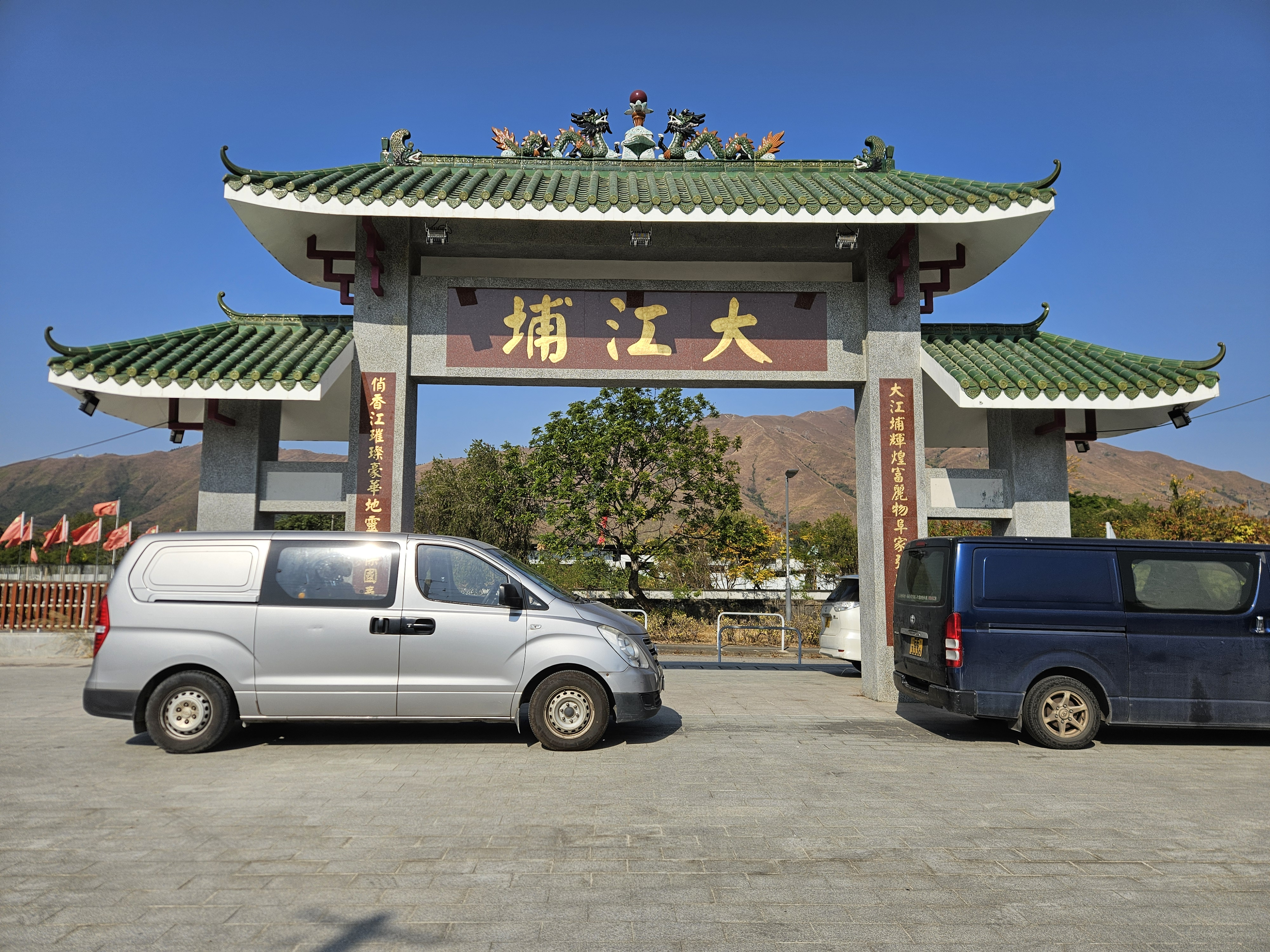
Paifang of Tai Kong Po in January 2026.

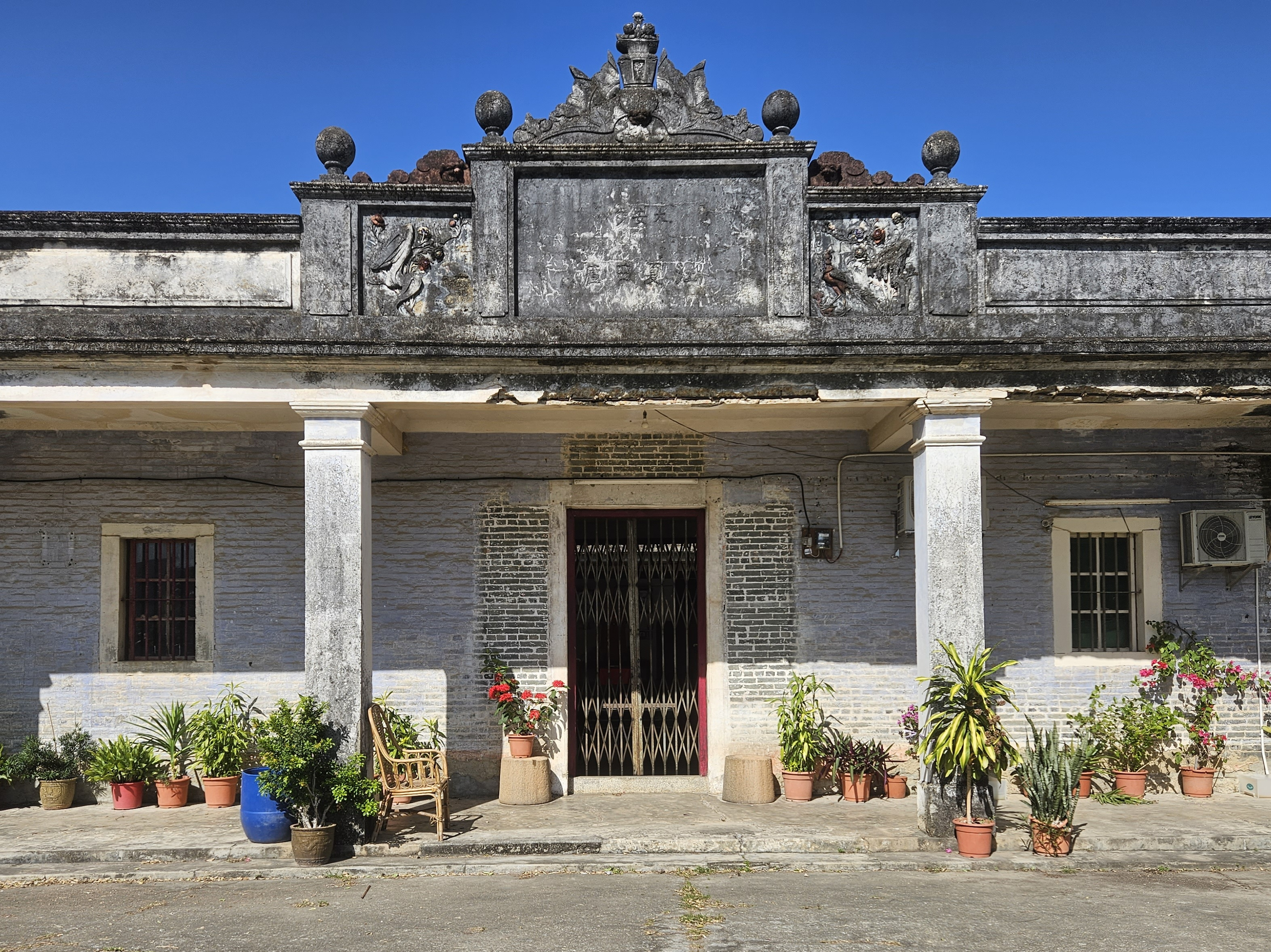
Kong Ha Tin Lo, Nos. 198-199 Tai Kong Po is a Grade II historic building. Taken in November 2023.

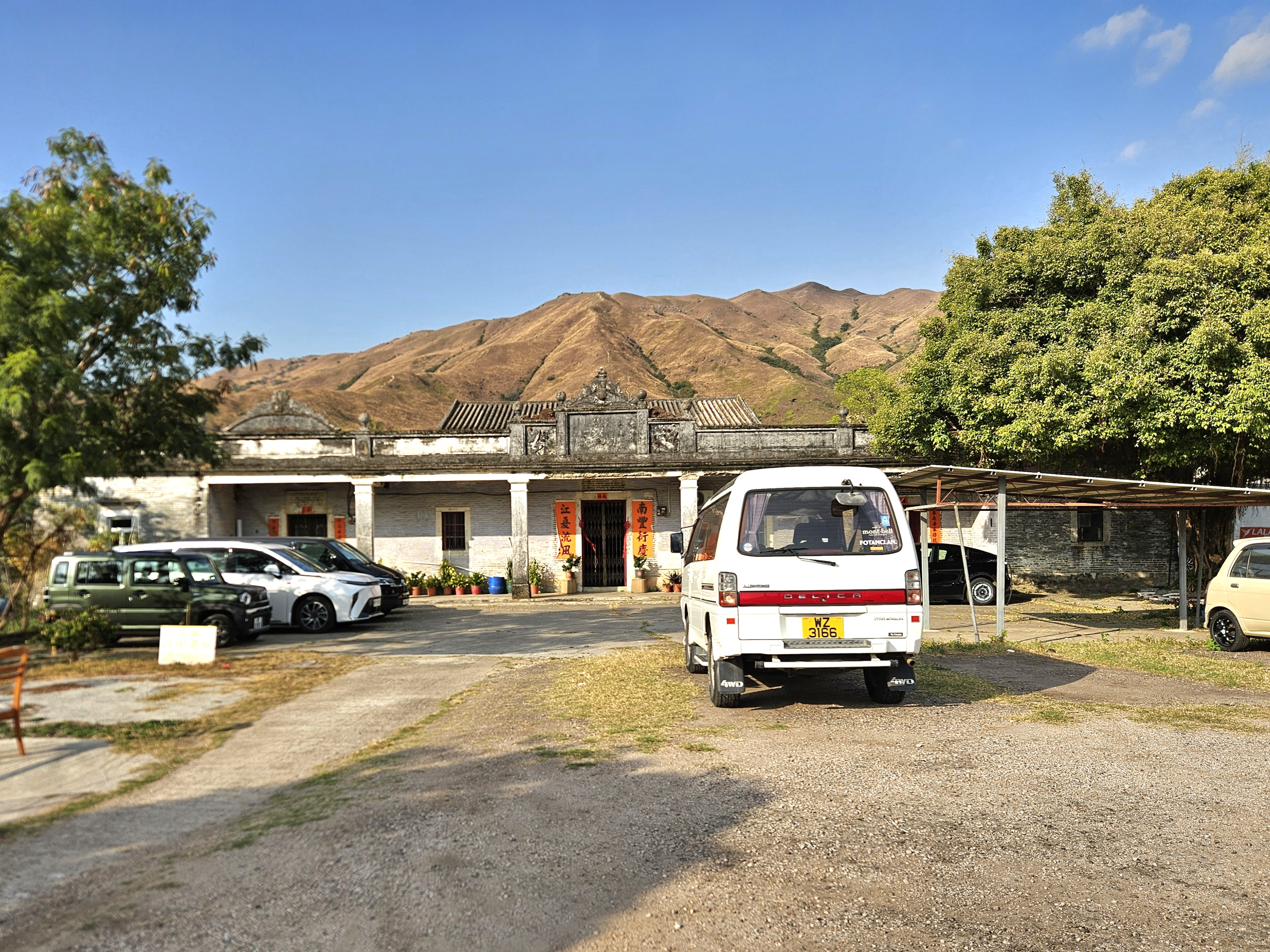
Full view of Kong Ha Tin Lo in February 2026.

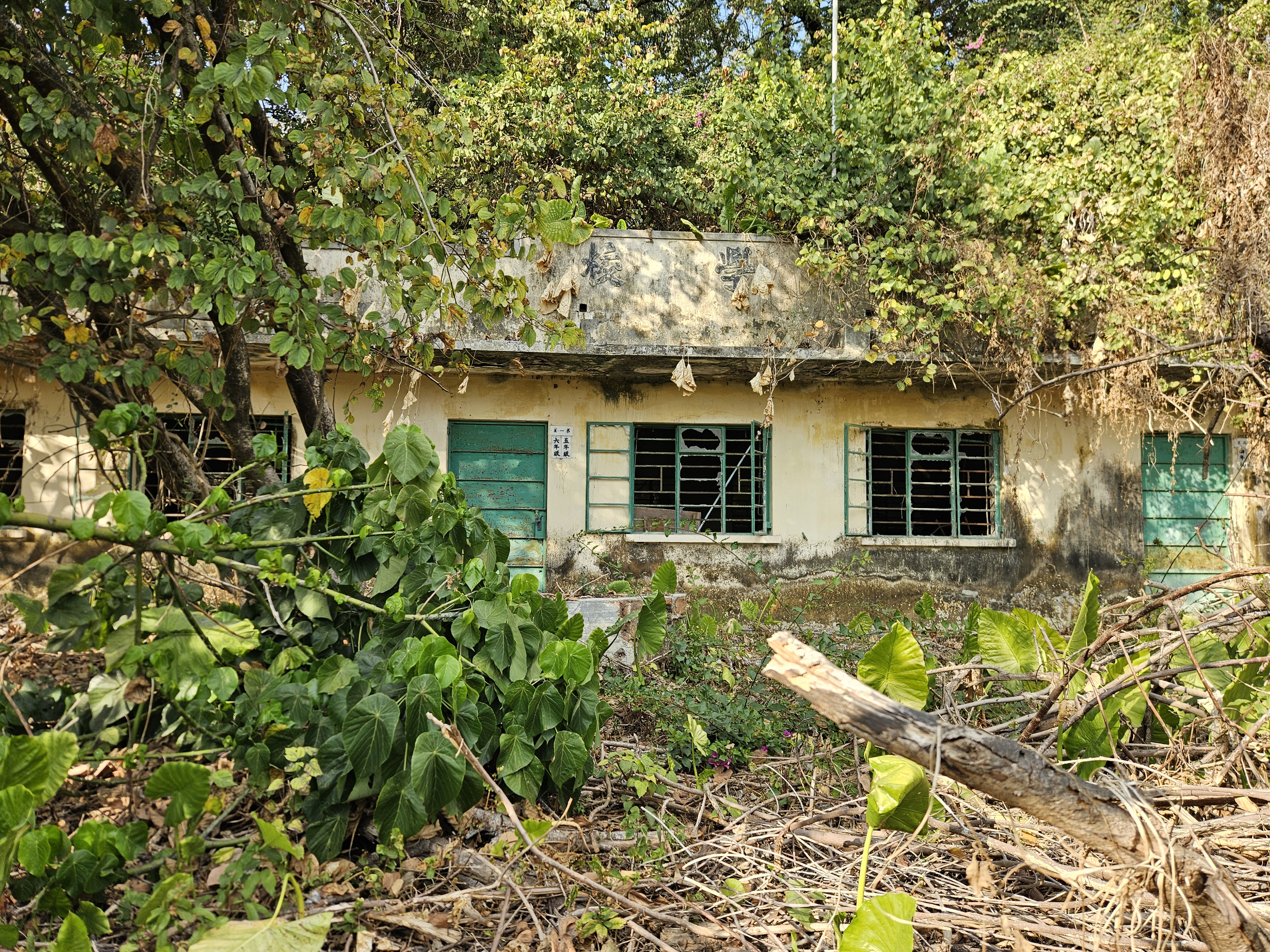
Ex-Tai On Public School, Tai Kong Po Tsuen in February 2026.

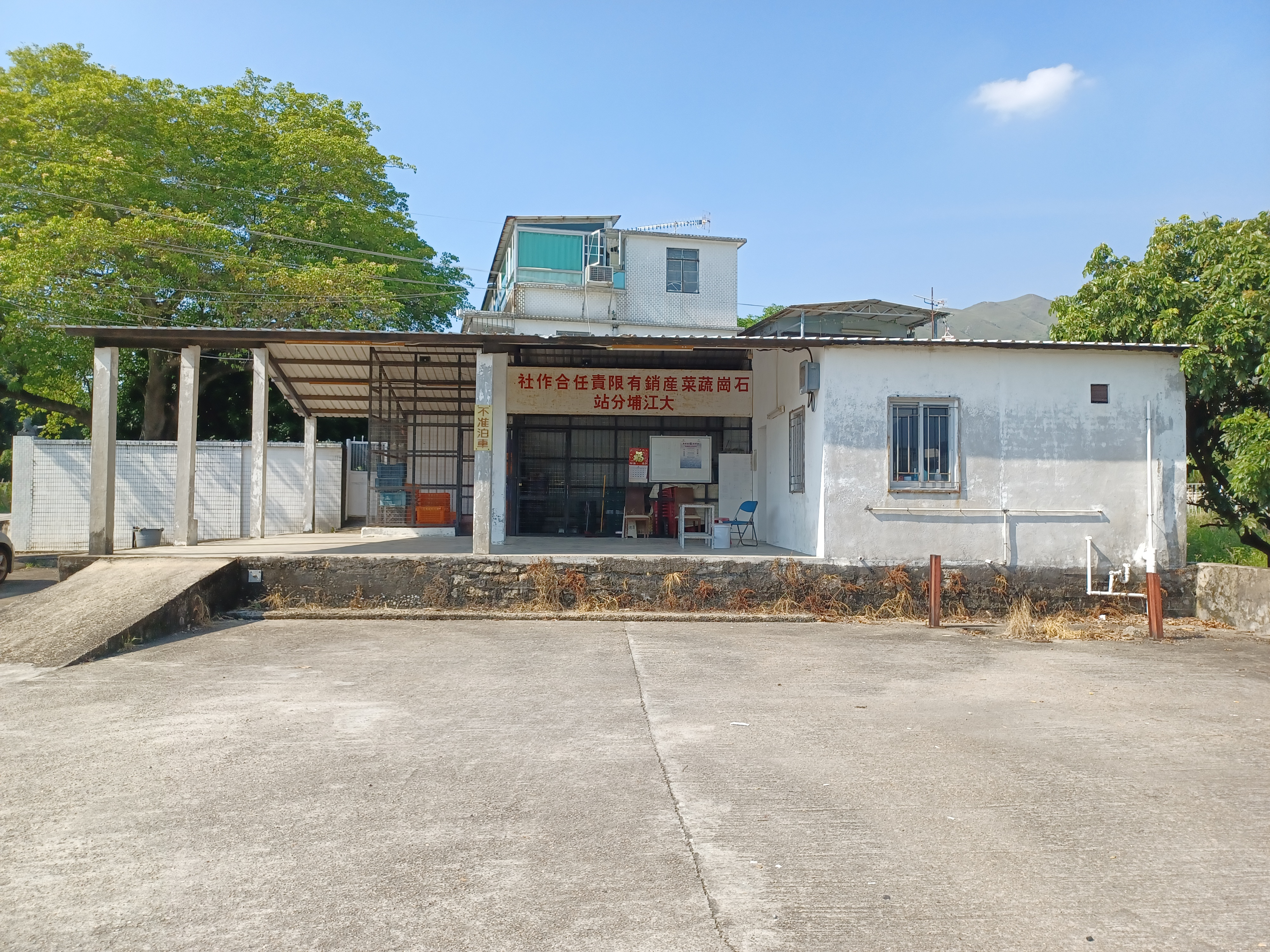
Shek Kong vegetable production and marketing limited liability cooperative Tai Kong Po substation

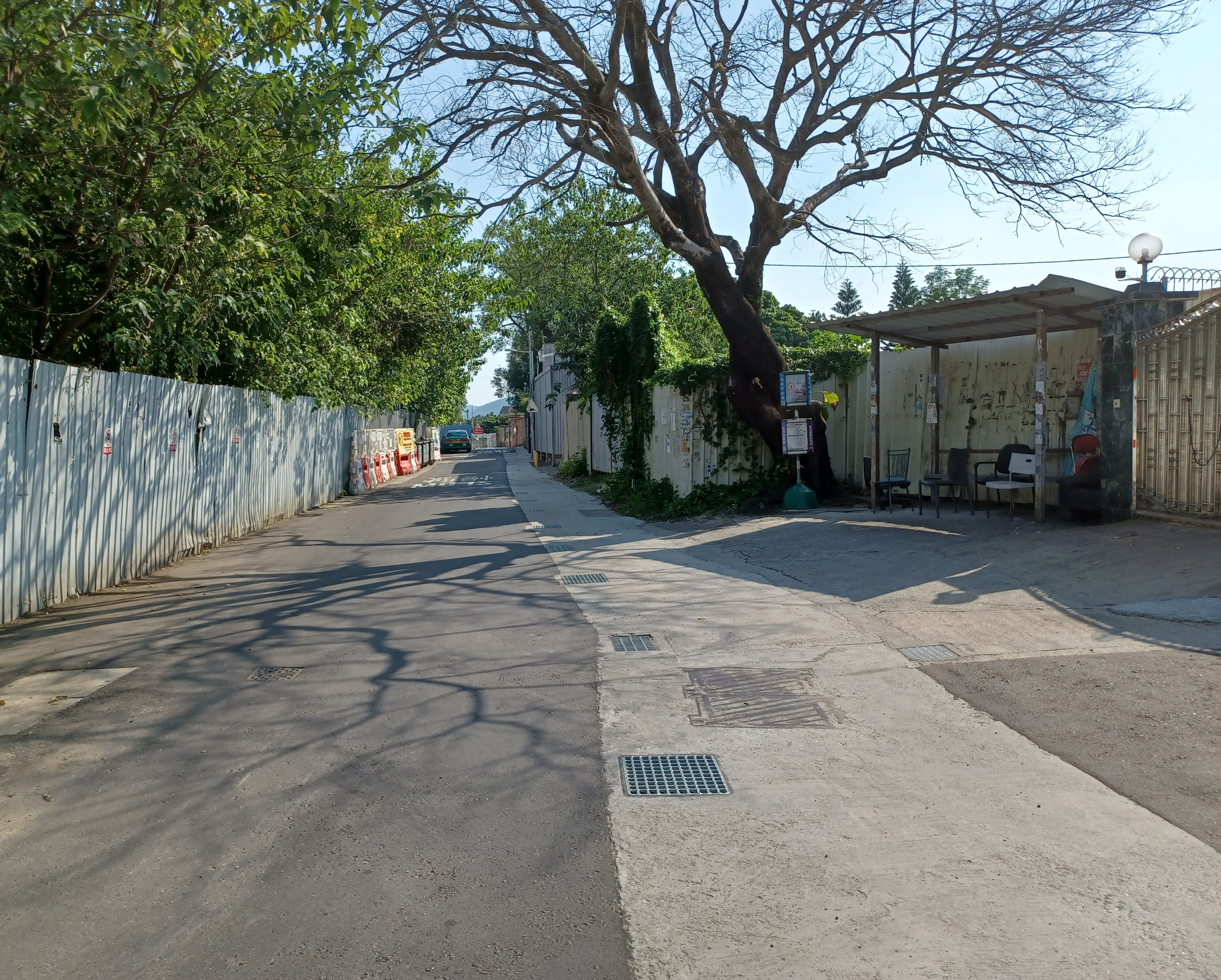
Kong Tai Road, the main road in this village and New Territories Green Minibus Route 602 Minibus Terminus (right hand side)

Tai Kong Po (Chinese: 大江埔) is a village in Pat Heung, Yuen Long District, Hong Kong.

== Administration ==
Tai Kong Po is a recognized village under the New Territories Small House Policy.
