= Cheung Kong Tsuen =

Village in Hong Kong

Coordinates: 22.444896°N 114.073298°E

Cheung Kong Tsuen (Chinese: 長江村) is a village in Pat Heung, Yuen Long District, Hong Kong.

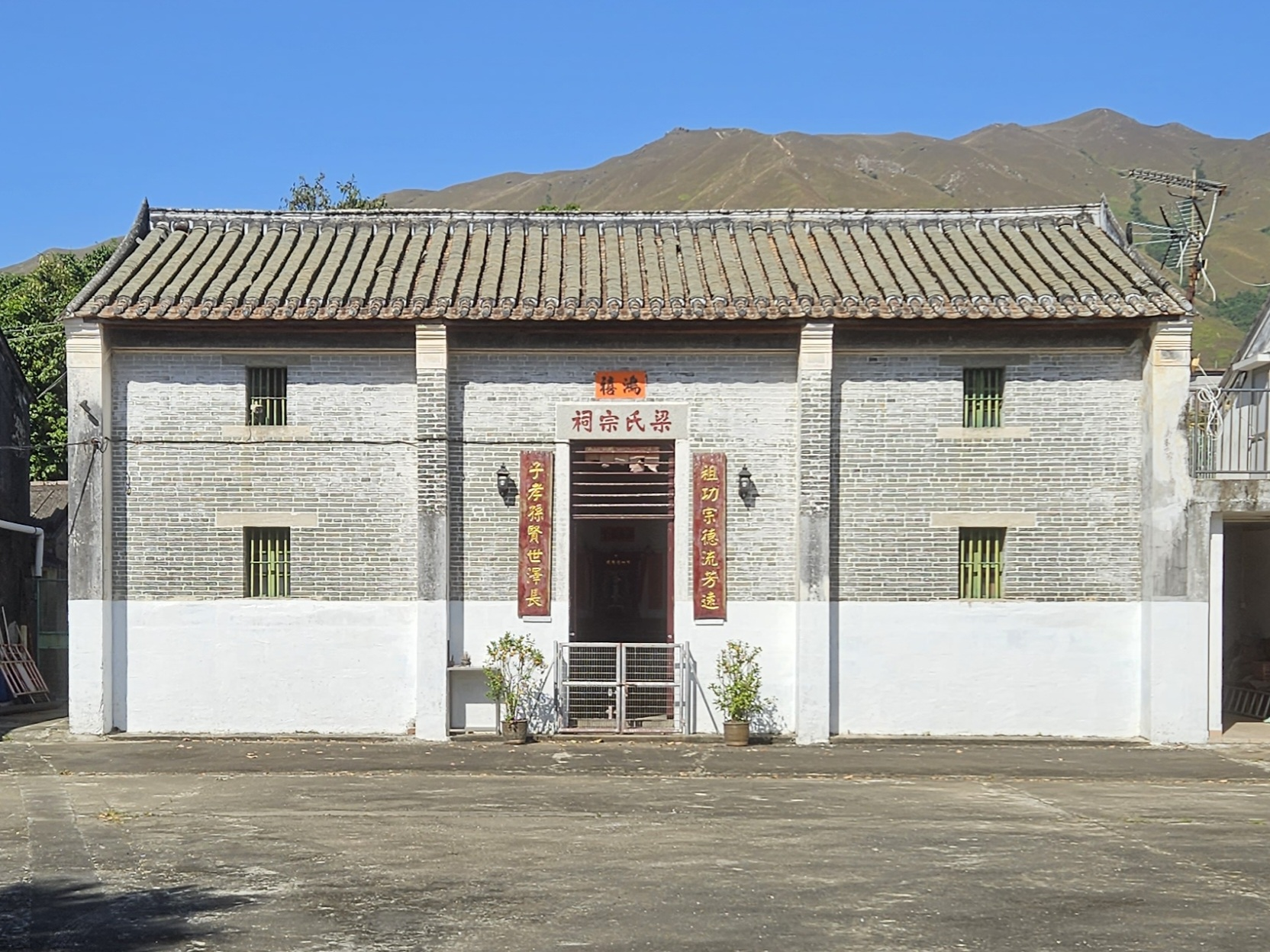
Leung Ancestral Hall, Cheung Kong Tsuen in 2023

== Administration ==
Cheung Kong Tsuen is a recognized village under the New Territories Small House Policy.
