= Pang Ka Tsuen =

Village of Hong Kong

Coordinates: 22.440821°N 114.076296°E

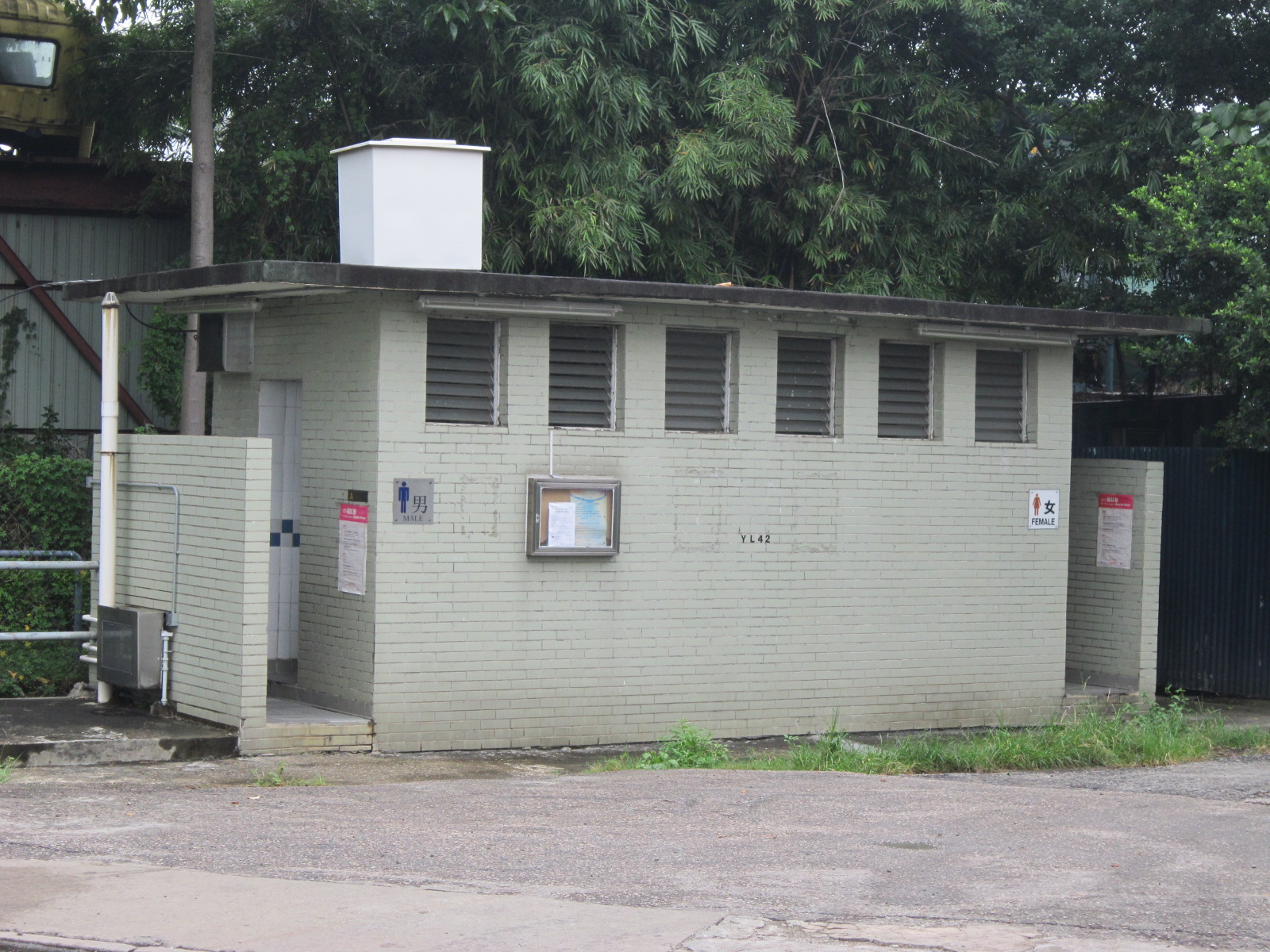
Pang Ka Tsuen public toilet.

Pang Ka Tsuen (Chinese: 彭家村) is a village in Pat Heung, Yuen Long District, Hong Kong.

== History ==
The first legal case in Hong Kong, in which it was suggested that it might be possible for one leaseholder to prescribe for an easement against another was Pang Kwan Lung v Ma Choi Hop in the 1960s. The land of the applicant plaintiffs was at Pang Ka Tsuen.
