= Sheung Che =

Coordinates: 22.450596°N 114.096366°E

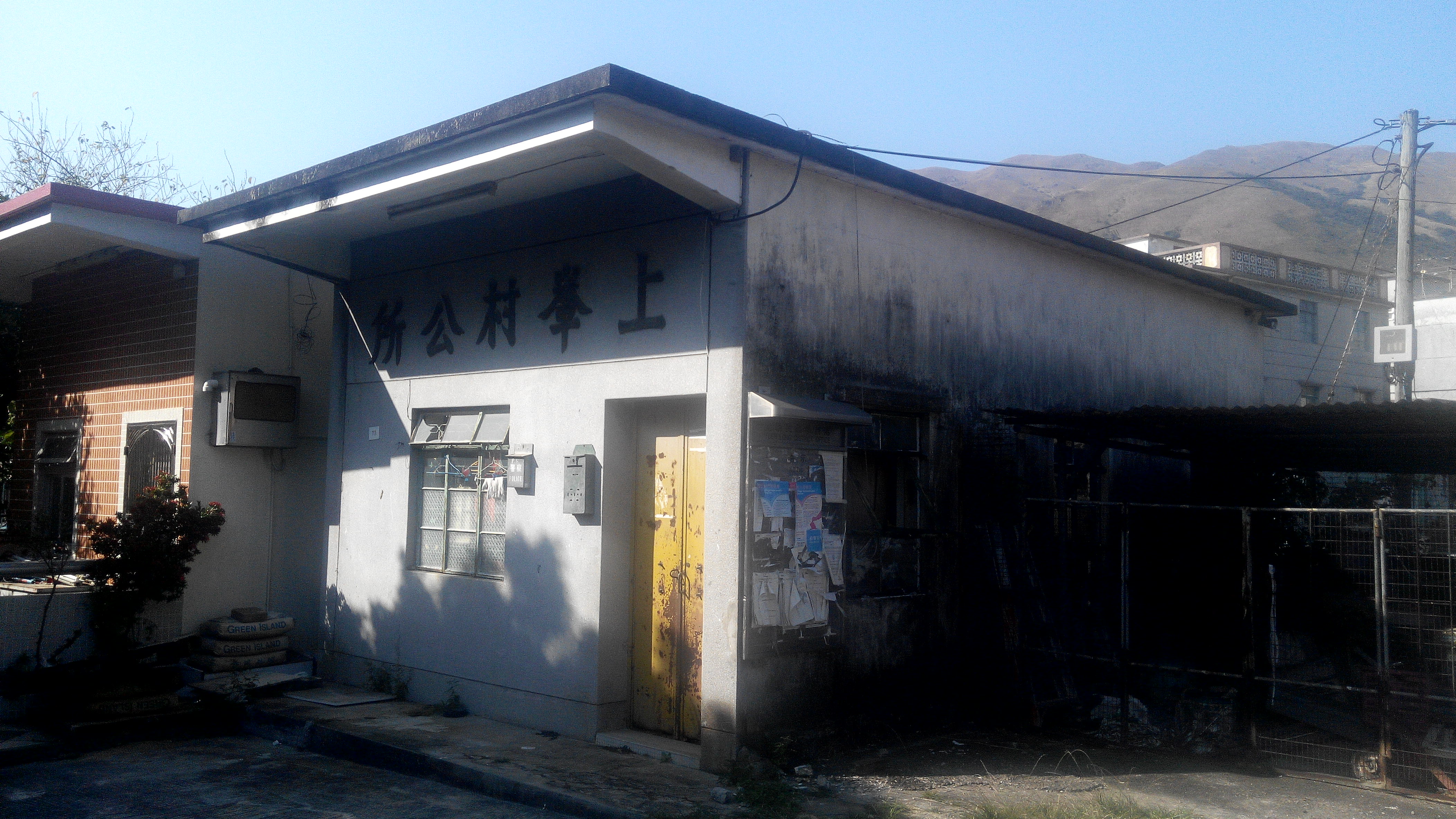
Sheung Che Village Office.

Sheung Che (Chinese: 上輋) is a village in Pat Heung, Yuen Long District, Hong Kong.

== Administration ==
Sheung Che is a recognized village under the New Territories Small House Policy.
