= Pat Heung =

Area of New Territories, Hong Kong

- Traditional Chinese: 八鄉
- Simplified Chinese: 八乡
- Literal meaning: eight rural townships
Transcriptions
Standard Mandarin
- Hanyu Pinyin: Bāxiāng
Yue: Cantonese
- Yale Romanization: Baat hēung
- Jyutping: Baat3 hoeng1

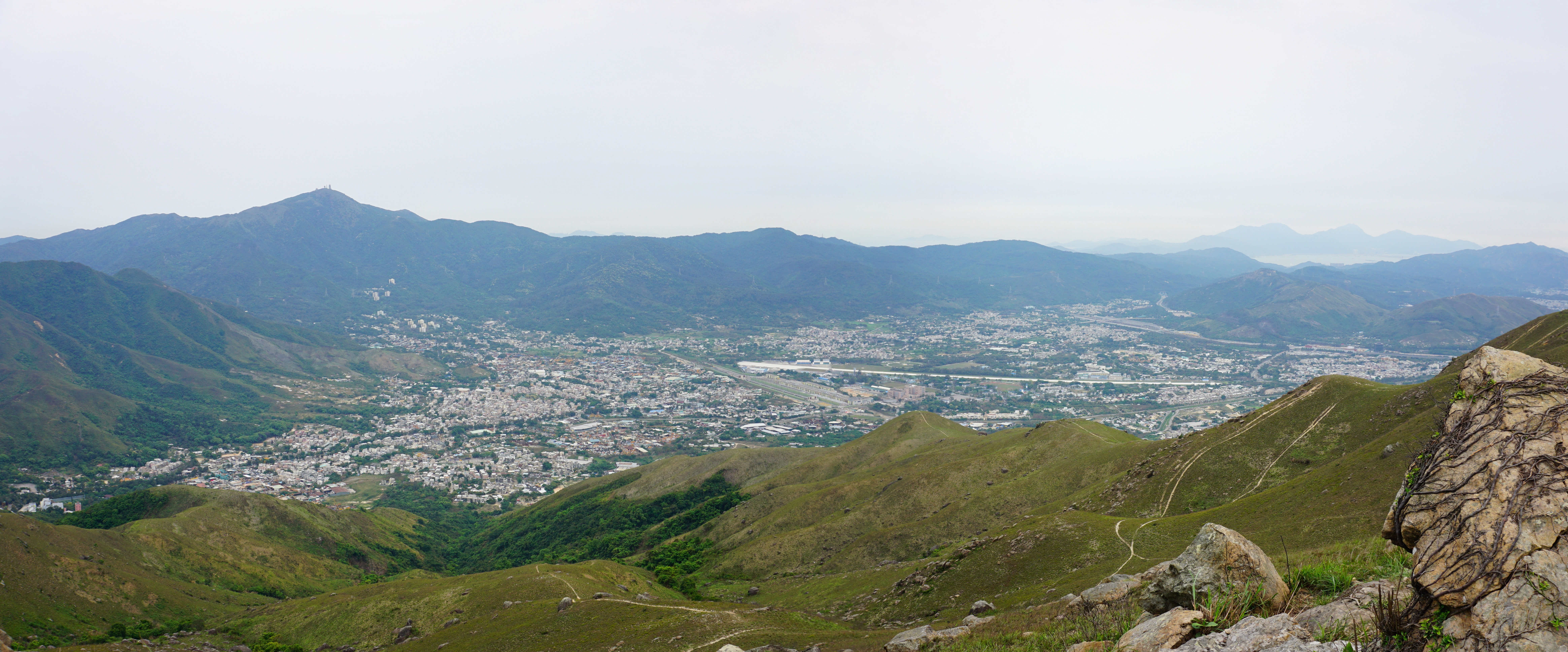
Pat Heung in Hong Kong.

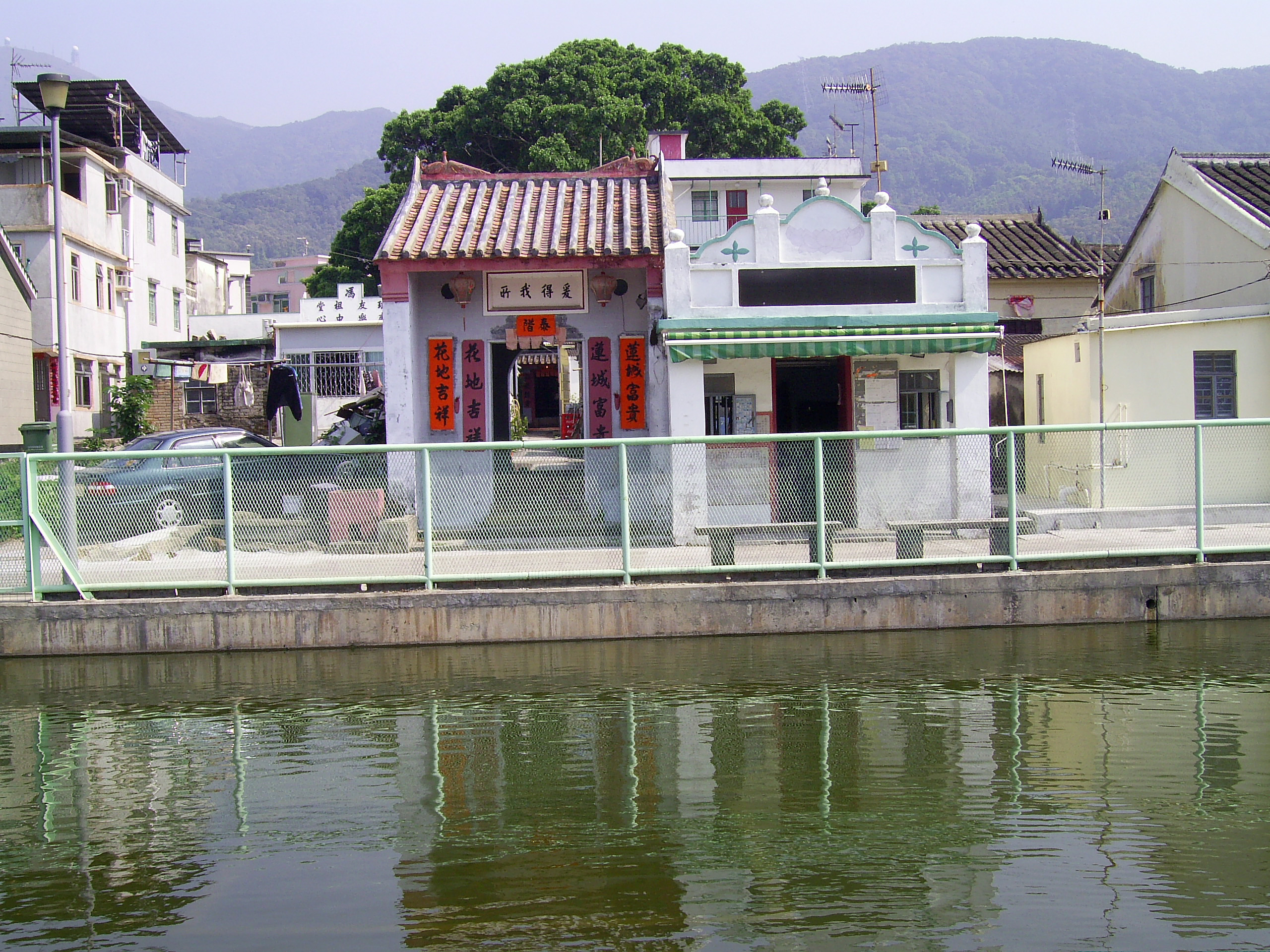
Lin Fa Tei, Pat Heung

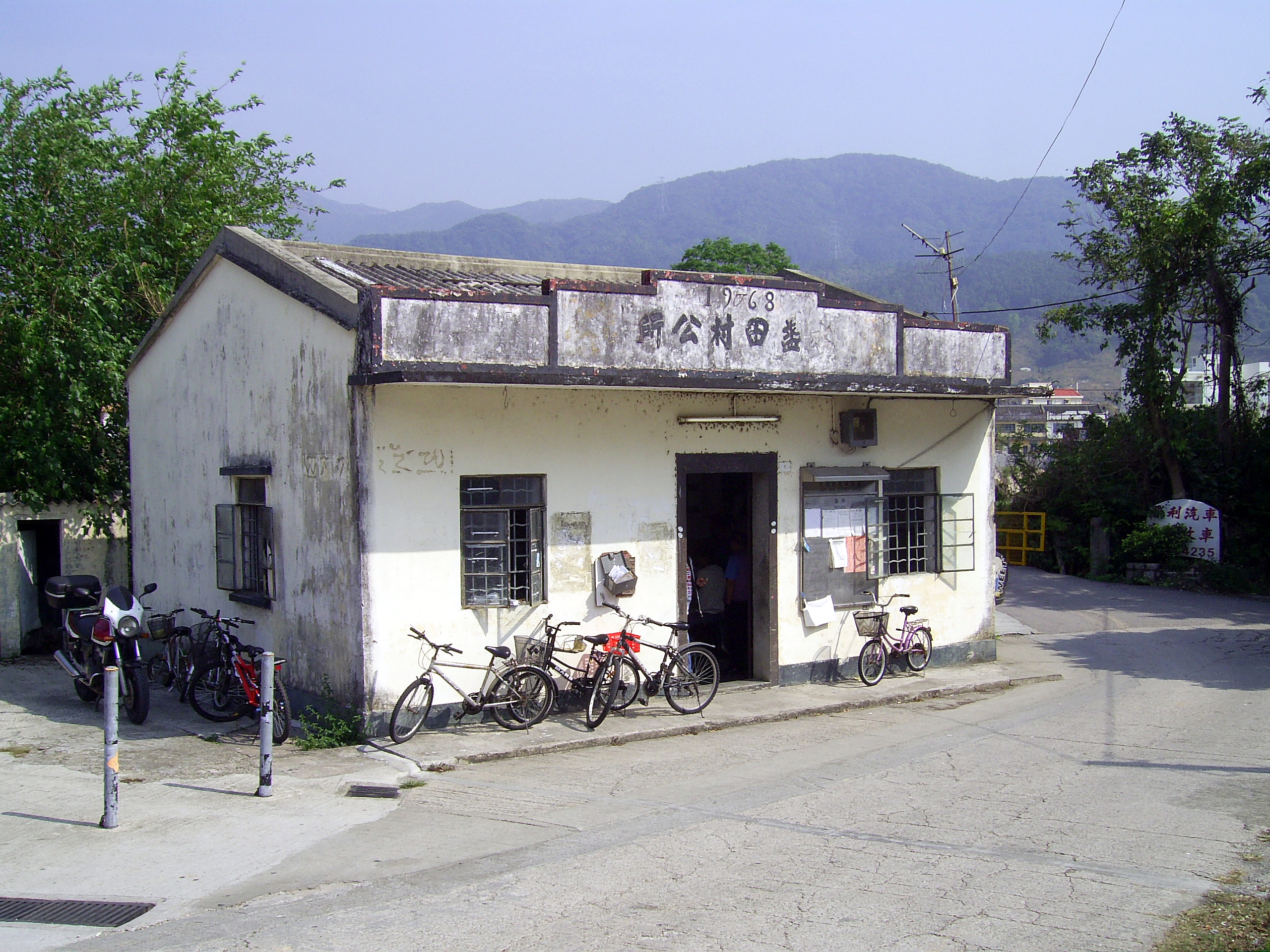
Shui Tsan Tin Village Office, Pat Heung

Pat Heung is an area in the middle of New Territories, Hong Kong. Located at the east of Kam Tin and north of Shek Kong, it is the exit to Sheung Shui and Fanling. Administratively, it belongs to Yuen Long District.

== Villages ==
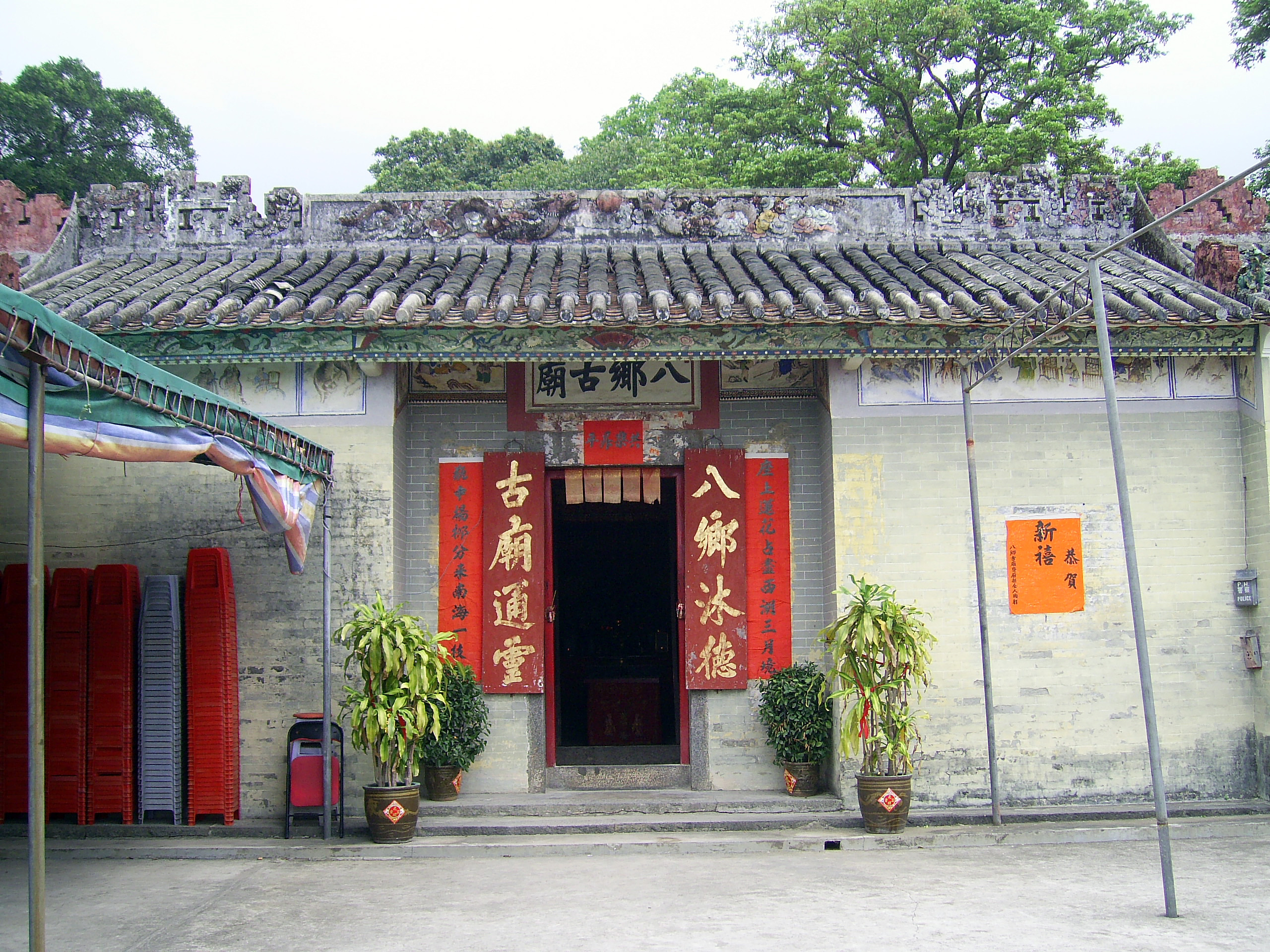
Pat Heung Temple in Sheung Tsuen

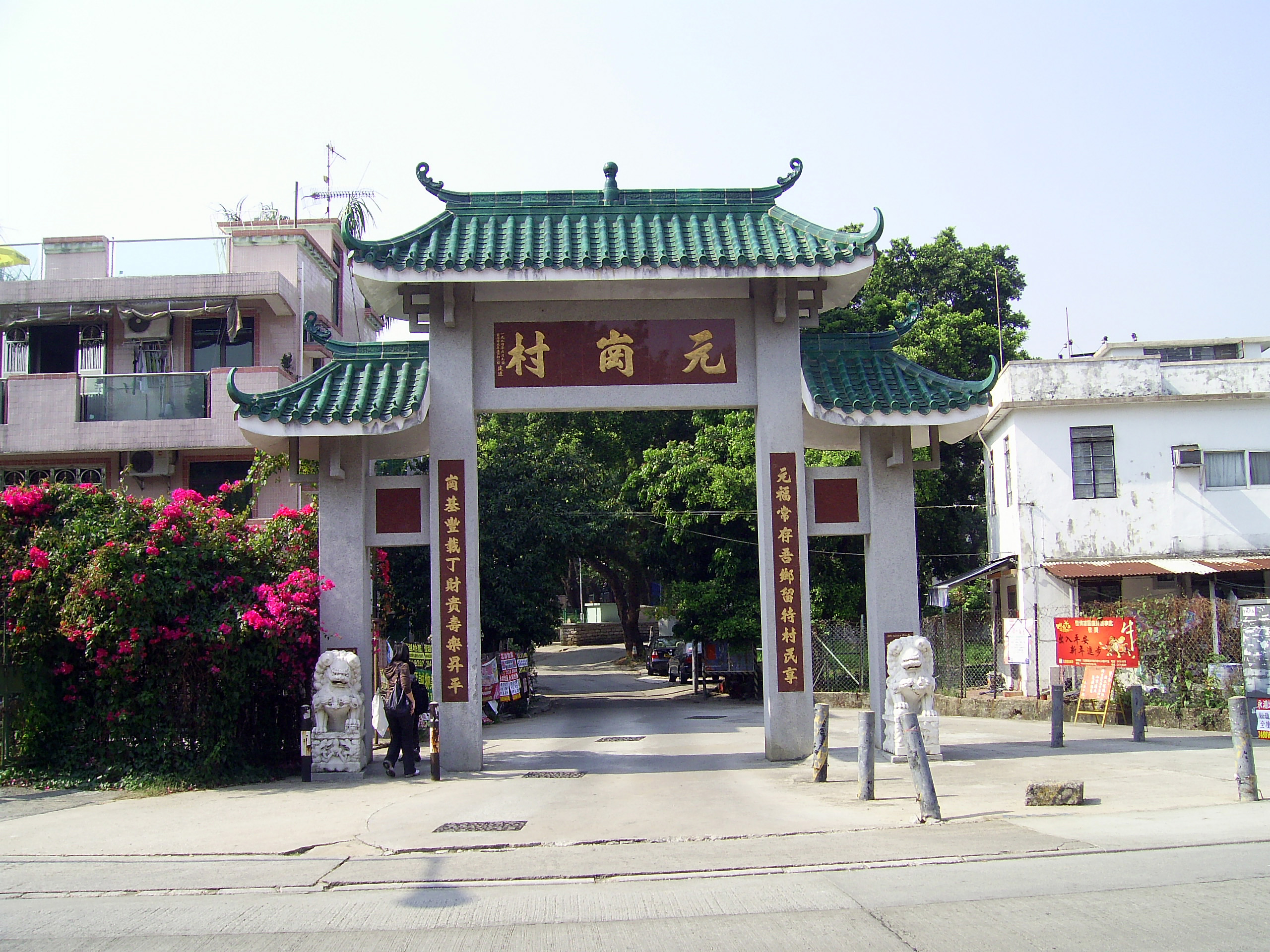
Yuen Kong Village archway

Pat Heung comprises 30 villages. The population is estimated to be about three thousand people.

- Tsat Sing Kong (七星崗)
- Ha Che (下輋)
- Sheung Tsuen (上村)
- Sheung Che (上輋)
- Tai Kong Po (大江埔)*
- Tai Wo (大窩)
- Yuen Kong (元崗)
- Yuen Kong San Tsuen (元崗新村)
- Shui Lau Tin (水流田)
- Shui Tsan Tin (水盞田)
- Ngau Keng (牛徑)
- Ta Shek Wu (打石湖)
- Tin Sam (田心)
- Kap Lung (甲龍)
- Shek Wu Tong (石湖塘)
- Chuk Hang (竹坑)
- Ng Ka Tsuen (吳家村)*
- Ho Pui (河背)
- Kam Tsin Wai (金錢圍)
- Cheung Kong Tsuen (長江)
- Cheung Po (長埔)
- Ma On Kong (馬鞍崗)
- Pang Ka Tsuen (彭家村)*
- Lui Kung Tin (雷公田)*
- Lin Fa Tei (蓮花地)
- Wang Toi Shan Ha San Uk (橫台山下新屋)
- Wang Toi Shan Wing Ning Lei (橫台山永寧里)
- Wang Toi Shan Ho Lik Pui (橫台山河瀝背)
- Wang Toi Shan Shan Tsuen (橫台山散村)
- Wang Toi Shan Lo Uk Tsuen (橫台山羅屋村)

*=非原居民村

== Features ==
Two historic buildings in Pat Heung have been declared as monuments: Leung Ancestral Hall in Yuen Kong Tsuen and Chik Kwai Study Hall, Sheung Tsuen.

== Transport ==
The area is where Kam Sheung Road, Kam Tin Road, Lam Kam Road, Route Twisk and Fan Kam Road join. The Kam Sheung Road station serves Pat Heung and the nearby Kam Tin area.

Buses 251B, 64K, 77K, 54 run through Pat Heung area.

== Education ==
Pat Heung is in Primary One Admission (POA) School Net 74. Within the school net are multiple aided schools (operated independently but funded with government money) and one government school: Yuen Long Government Primary School (元朗官立小學).

== See also ==
- List of places in Hong Kong
