= Ng Ka Tsuen =

Coordinates: 22.437183°N 114.070308°E

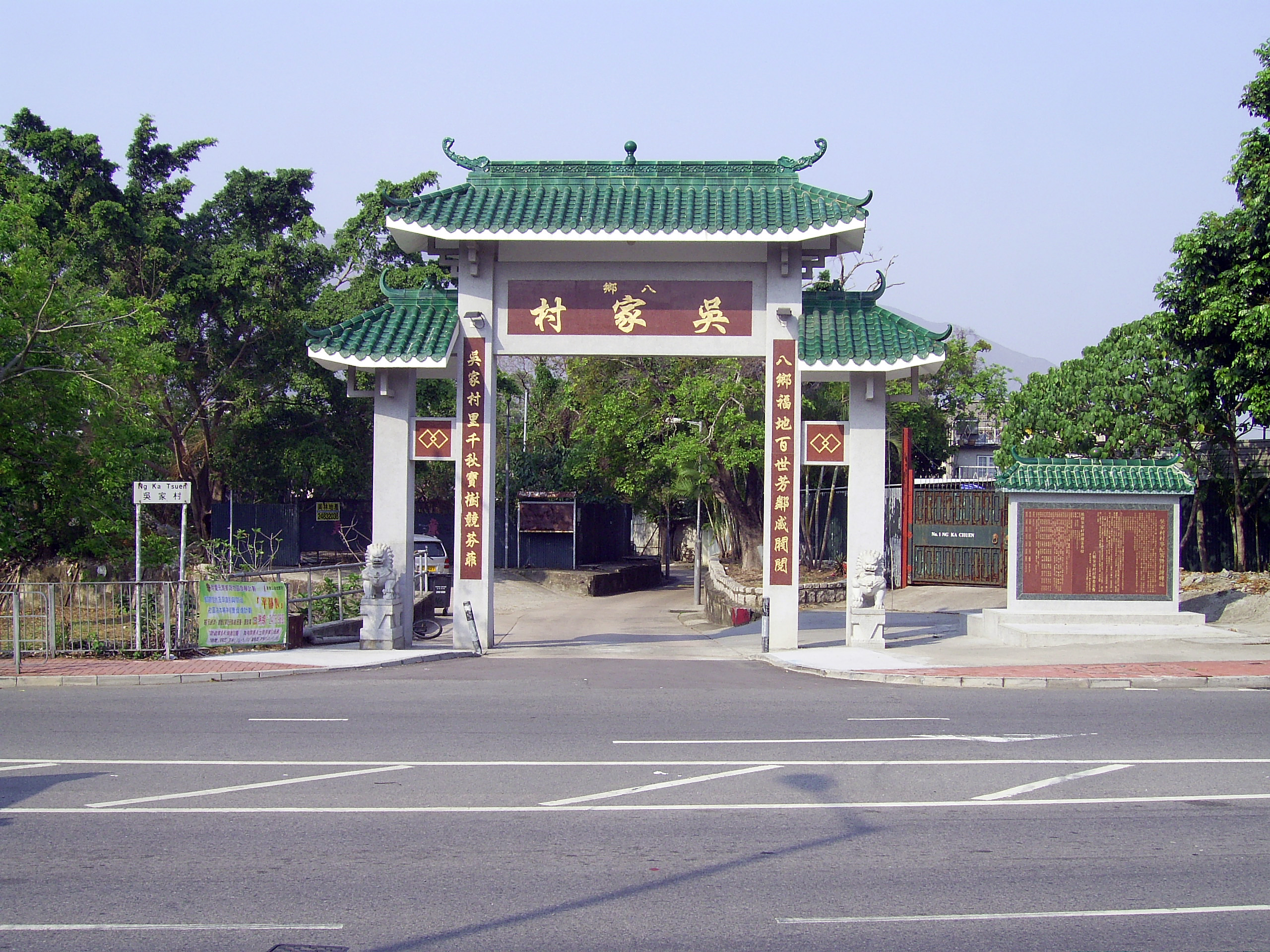
Ng Ka Tsuen archway.

Ng Ka Tsuen (Chinese: 吳家村) is a village in Pat Heung, Yuen Long District, Hong Kong.

== Administration ==
Ng Ka Tsuen is a recognized village under the New Territories Small House Policy.
