= Shek Wu Tong Tsuen =

Coordinates: 22.426175°N 114.071941°E

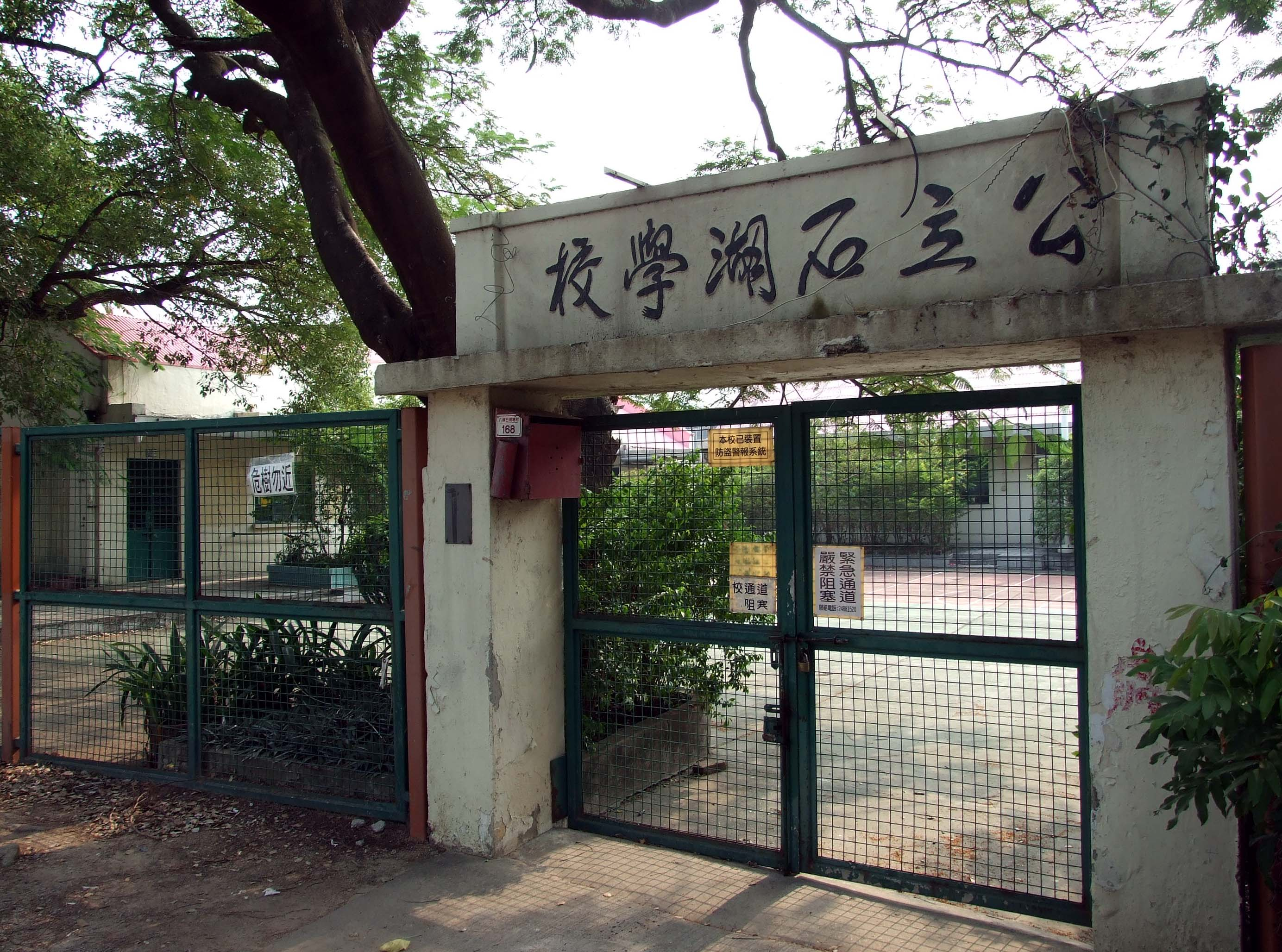
Former Shek Wu Public School (公立石湖學校) in Shek Wu Tong.

Shek Wu Tong Tsuen (Chinese: 石湖塘村) is a village in Pat Heung, Yuen Long District, Hong Kong.

== Administration ==
Shek Wu Tong is a recognized village under the New Territories Small House Policy.
