= Wang Toi Shan =

Area of Pat Heung, Hong Kong

Coordinates: 22.44134°N 114.094299°E

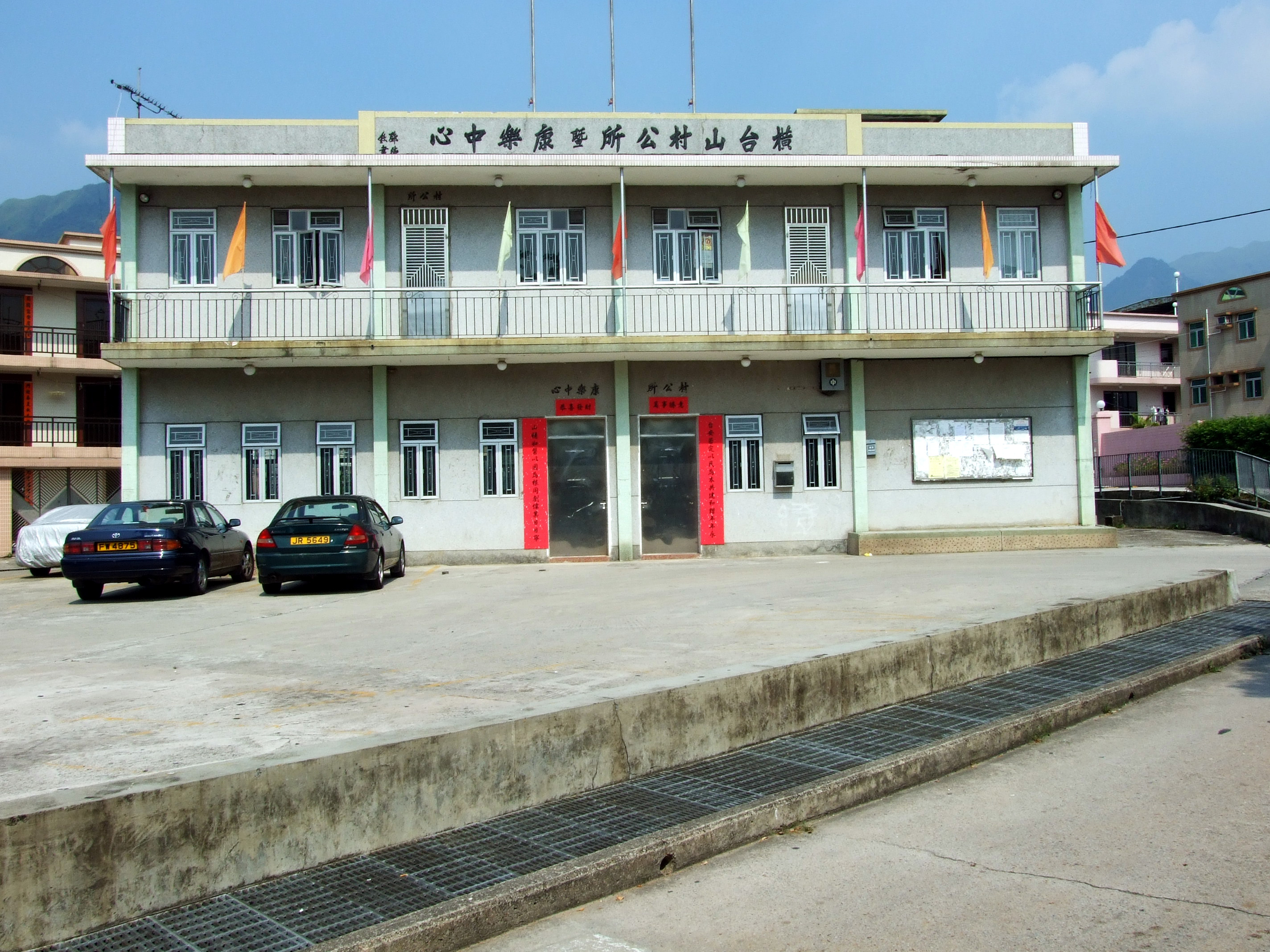
Wang Toi Shan Village Office.

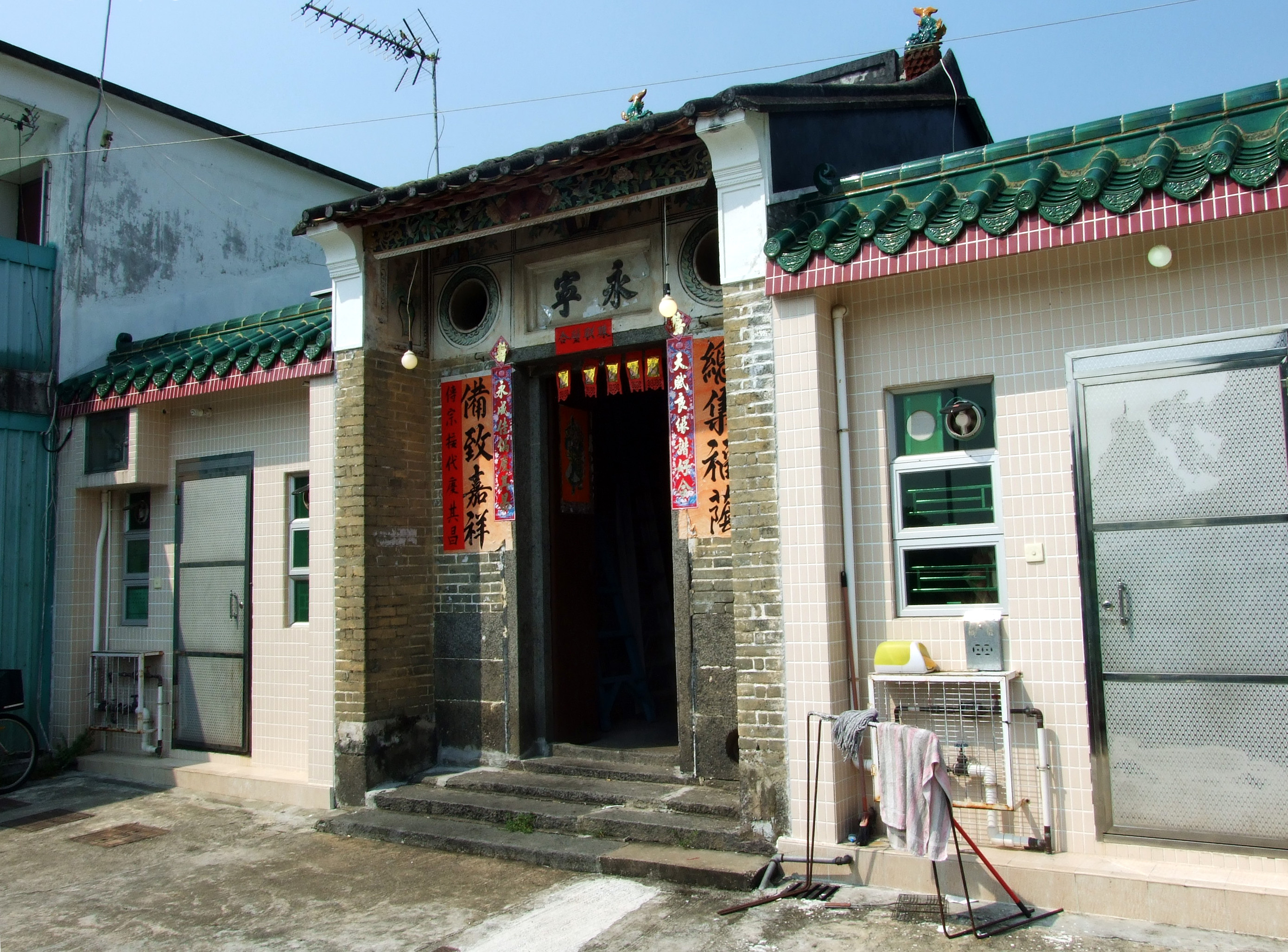
Entrance gate of Wang Toi Shan Wing Ning Lei.

Wang Toi Shan (Chinese: 橫台山) is an area of Pat Heung, in Yuen Long District, Hong Kong.

== Administration ==
Wang Toi Shan is a recognized village under the New Territories Small House Policy.

== Villages ==
Villages in the area include:

- San Lung Wai (新隆圍)
- Wang Toi Shan Ha San Uk (橫台山下新屋)
- Wang Toi Shan Ho Lik Pui (橫台山河瀝背)
- Wang Toi Shan Lo Uk Tsuen (橫台山羅屋村)
- Wang Toi Shan San Tsuen (橫台山新村)
- Wang Toi Shan Shan Tsuen (橫台山散村)
- Wang Toi Shan Wing Ning Lei (橫台山永寧里)
- Wang Toi Shan Yau Uk Tsuen (橫台山邱屋村)
