= Kam Tin Shi =

Village in Hong Kong

Coordinates: 22.44058°N 114.061578°E

- Traditional Chinese: 錦田市
- Simplified Chinese: 锦田市
Transcriptions
Standard Mandarin
- Hanyu Pinyin: Jǐn Tián Shì
Yue: Cantonese
- Jyutping: gam2 tin4 si5

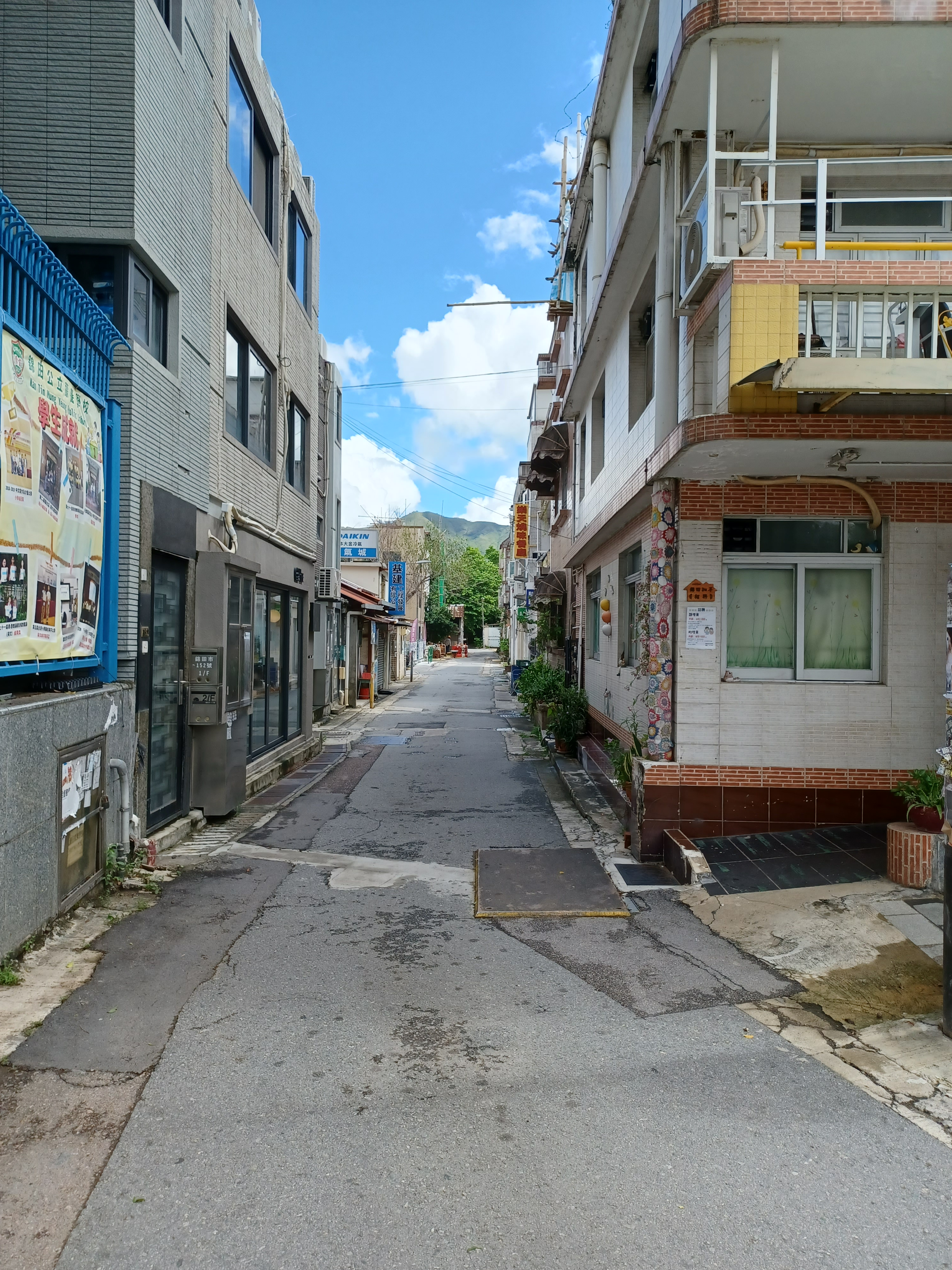
Kam Tin Shi Street in Kam Tin Shi.

Kam Tin Shi (Chinese: 錦田市) is a village in Kam Tin, in the Yuen Long District of the New Territories of Hong Kong.

== Administration ==
Kam Tin Shi is a recognized village under the New Territories Small House Policy.
