= Tin Sam Tsuen, Pat Heung =

Coordinates: 22.423998°N 114.069936°E

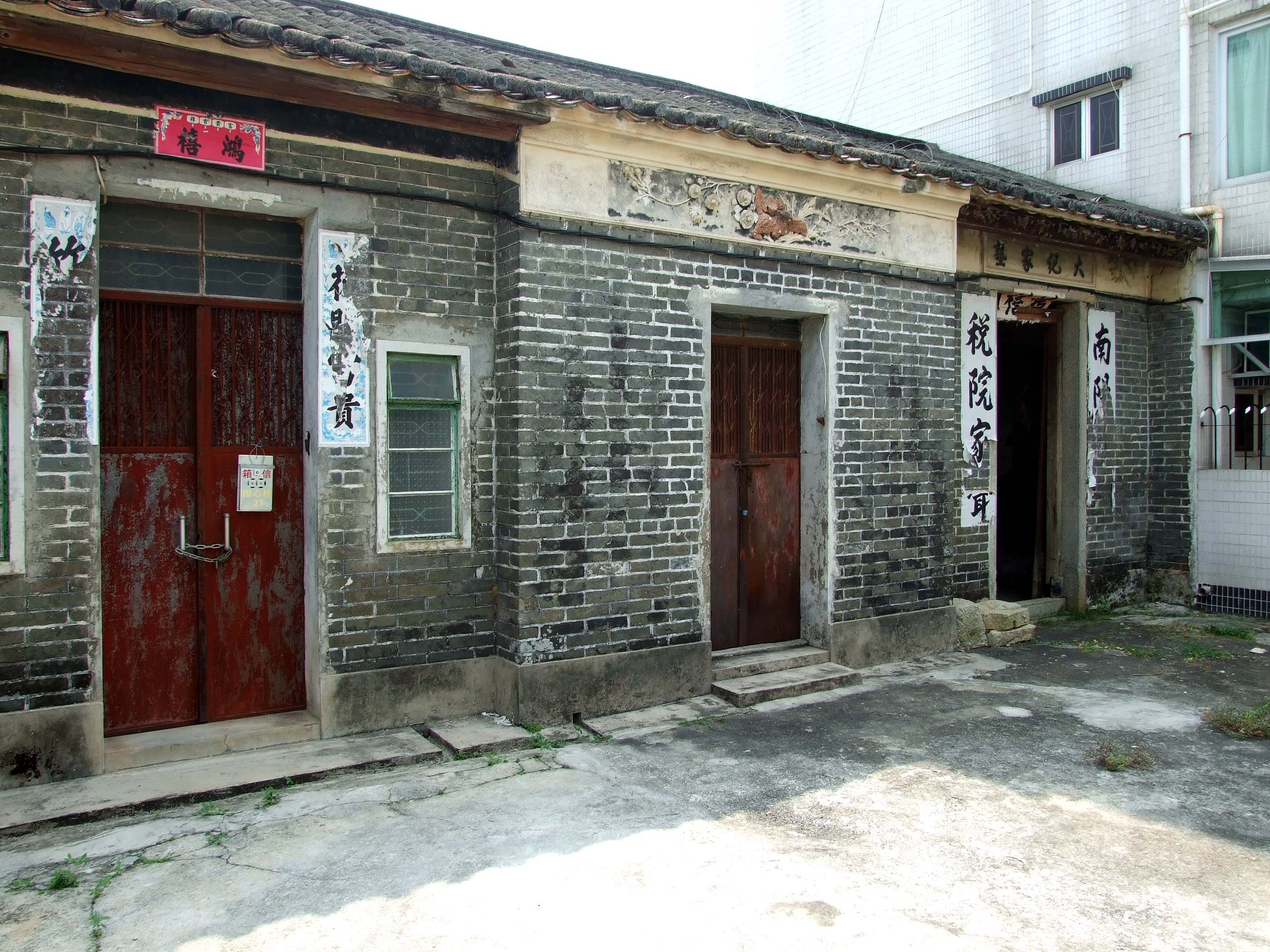
Tai Kei Study Hall (大紀家塾) in Tin Sam San Tsuen (田心新村; 'Tin Sam New Village').

Tin Sam Tsuen (Chinese: 田心村) is a village in Pat Heung, Yuen Long District, Hong Kong.

== Administration ==
Tin Sam is a recognized village under the New Territories Small House Policy. Tin Sam Tsuen is one of the villages represented within the Pat Heung Rural Committee. For electoral purposes, Tin Sam Tsuen is part of the Pat Heung South constituency, which is currently represented by Lai Wing-tim.
