= Tai Wo Tsuen, Yuen Long District =

Village in Pat Heung, Hong Kong

Coordinates: 22.417973°N 114.075419°E

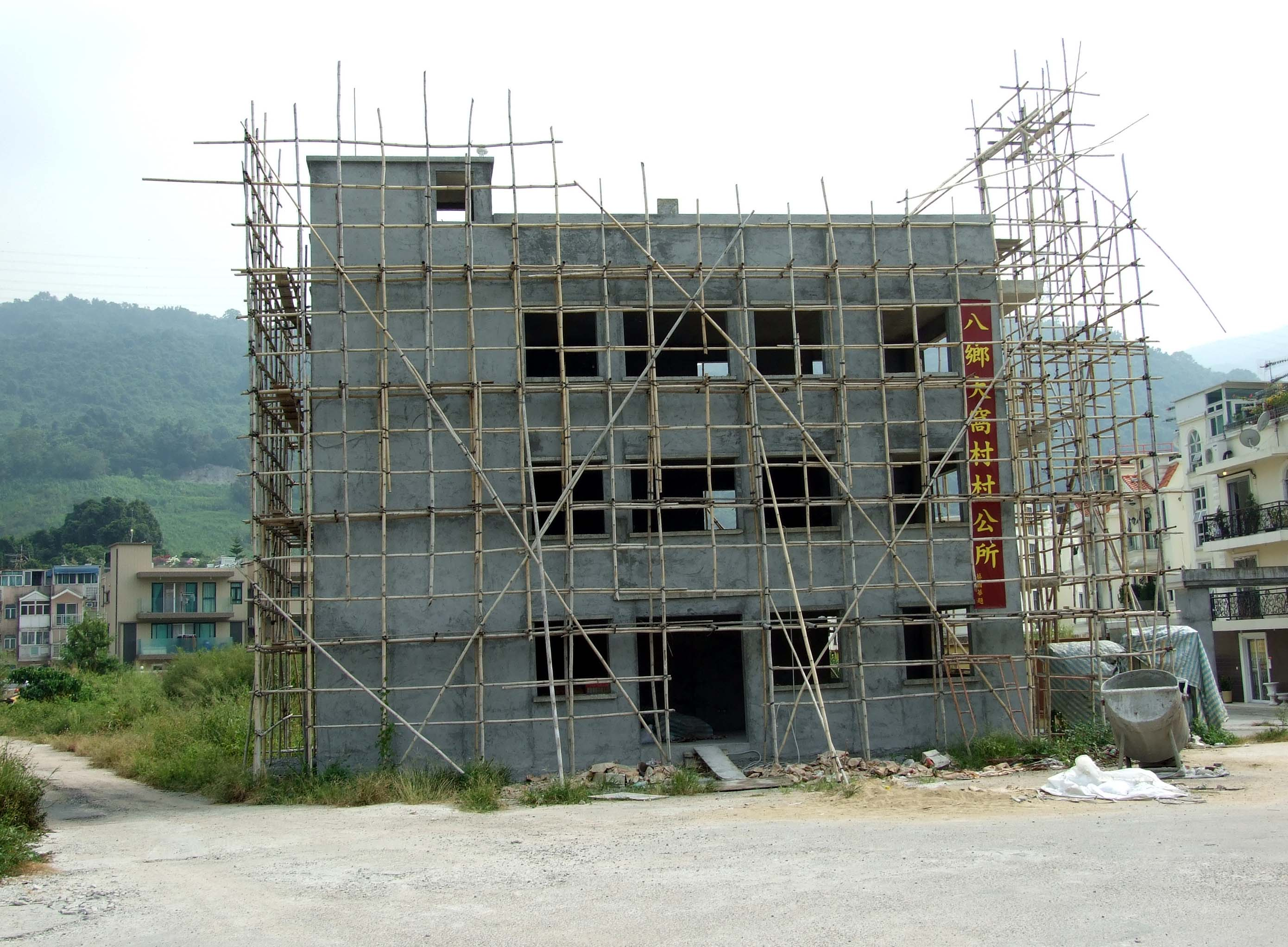
Tai Wo Tsuen village office.

Tai Wo Tsuen (Chinese: 大窩村), sometimes transliterated as Tai Wor, is a village in Pat Heung, Yuen Long District, Hong Kong.

== Administration ==
Tai Wor is a recognized village under the New Territories Small House Policy. Tai Wo Tsuen is one of the villages represented within the Pat Heung Rural Committee. For electoral purposes, Tai Wo Tsuen is part of the Pat Heung South constituency, which is currently represented by Lai Wing-tim.
