= Sheung Tsuen =

Village in Hong Kong

Coordinates: 22.4290°N 114.1056°E

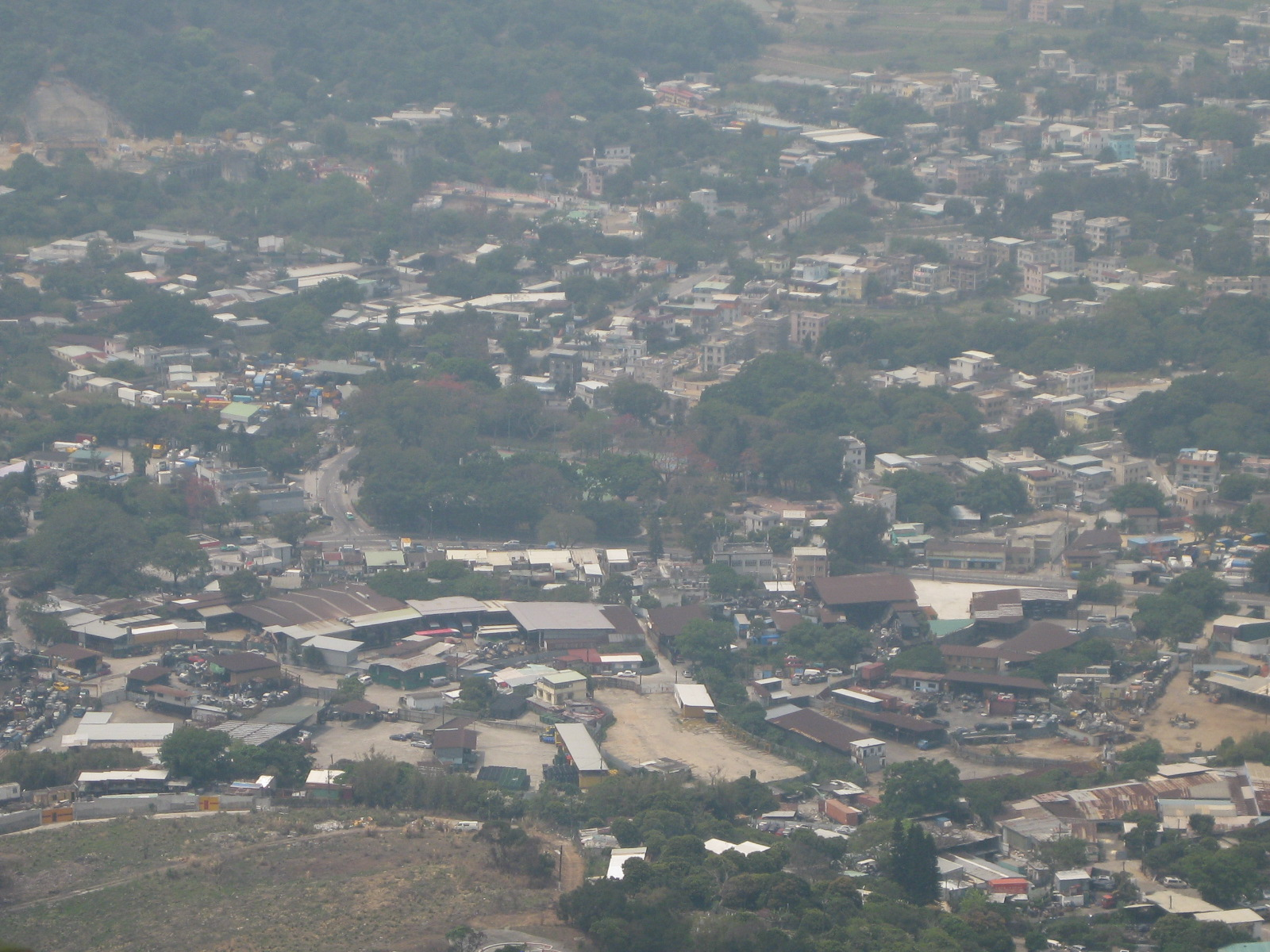
Houses in the Sheung Tsuen area.

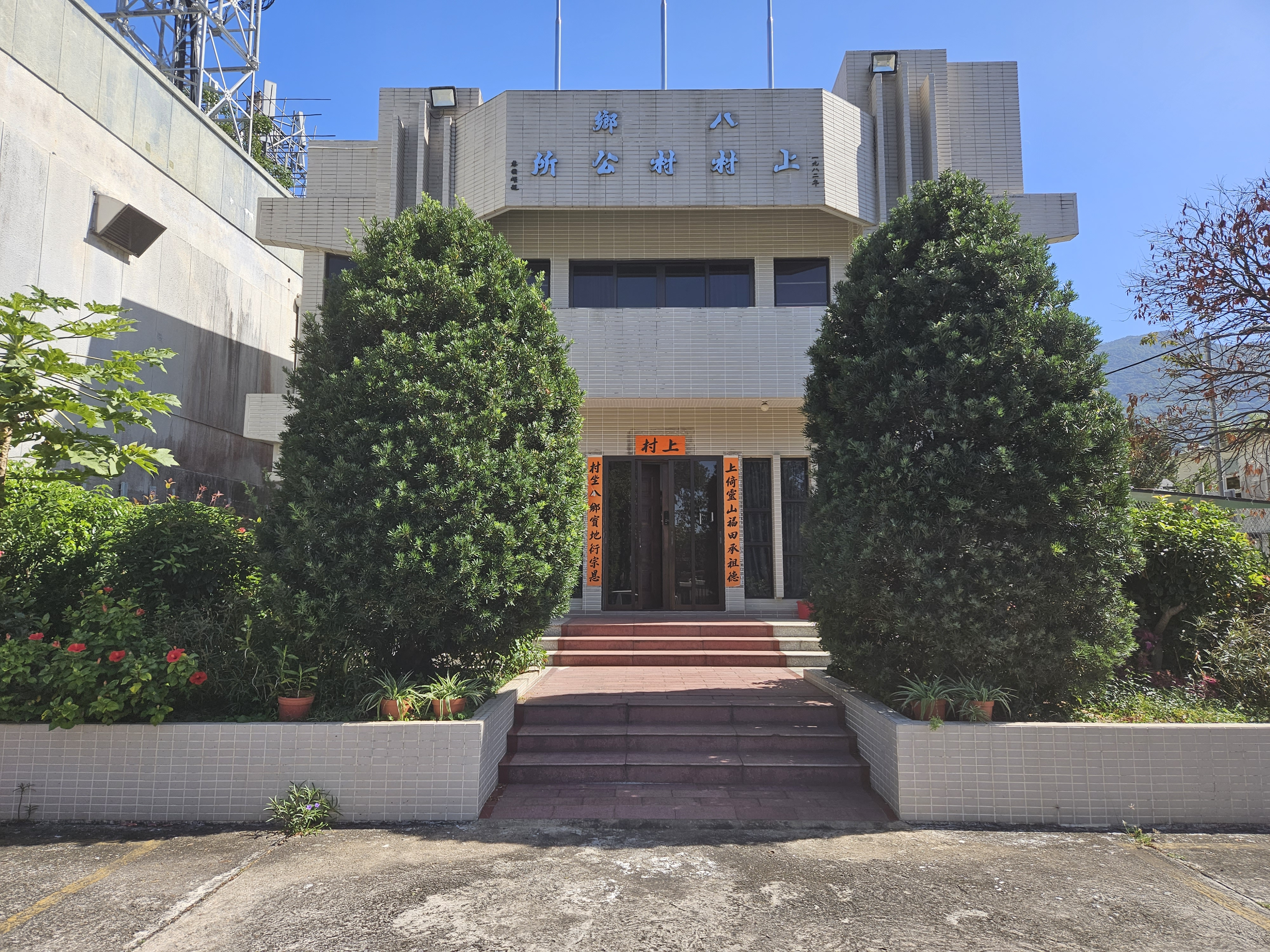
Sheung Tsuen Village Office.

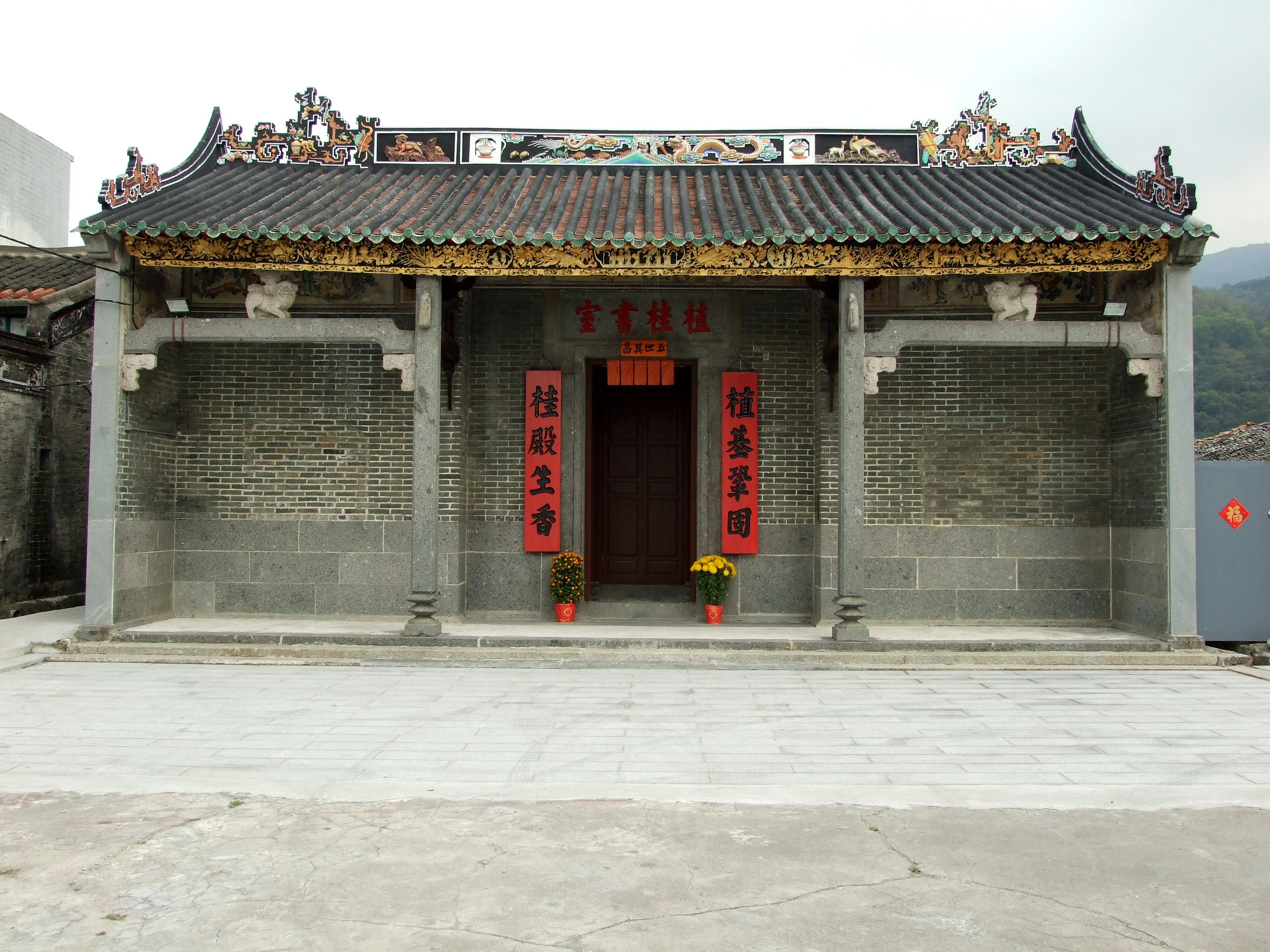
Chik Kwai Study Hall.

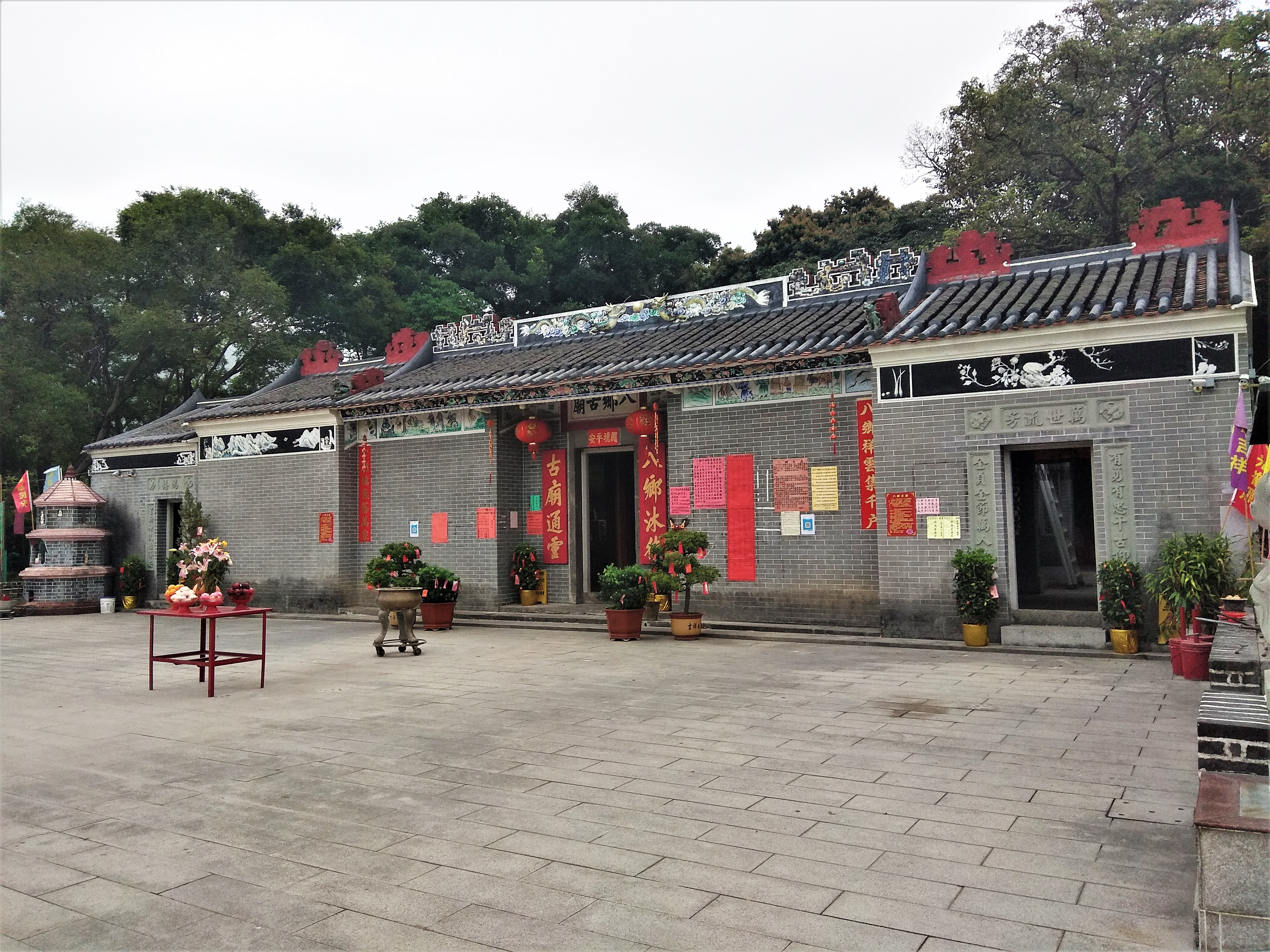
Pat Heung Temple in Sheung Tsuen.

Sheung Tsuen (Chinese: 上村) is a village in the Pat Heung area of Yuen Long located along Route Twisk and Kam Sheung Road in the New Territories, Hong Kong.

== Administration ==
Sheung Tsuen is a recognized village under the New Territories Small House Policy.

== Features ==
Chik Kwai Study Hall, a typical traditional Chinese academy and monument, is located in Sheung Tsuen. It is a declared monument.

Shek Tau Wai (石頭圍), a multiple clan village founded several hundred years ago, which appears on the "Map of the San-On District", published in 1866 by Simeone Volonteri, is now located on the territory of Sheung Tsuen.

== See also ==
- Six-Day War (1899)
