= Lin Fa Tei =

Village in Hong Kong

Coordinates: 22.428009°N 114.086948°E

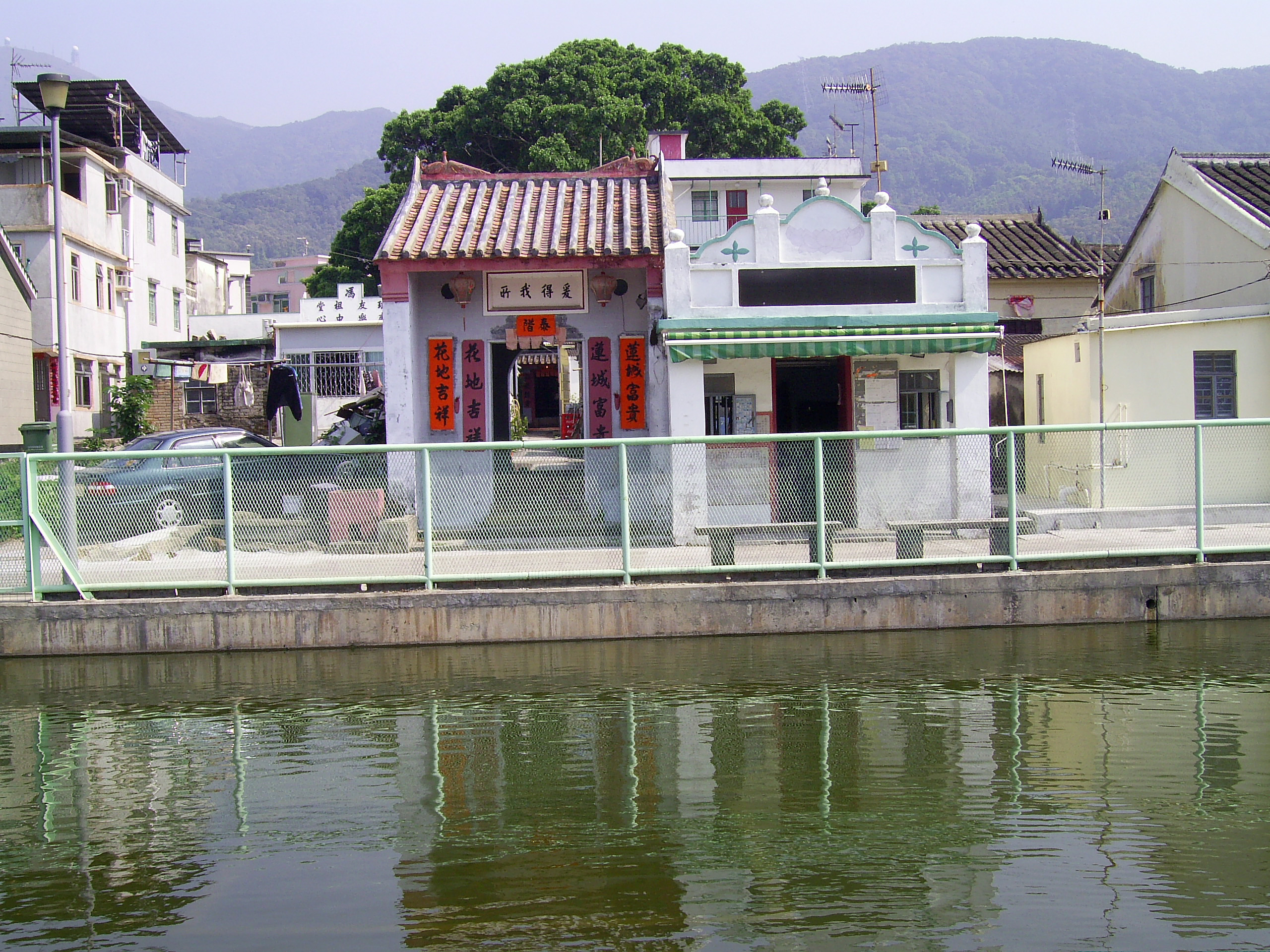
Entrance gate of Hop Shan Wai.

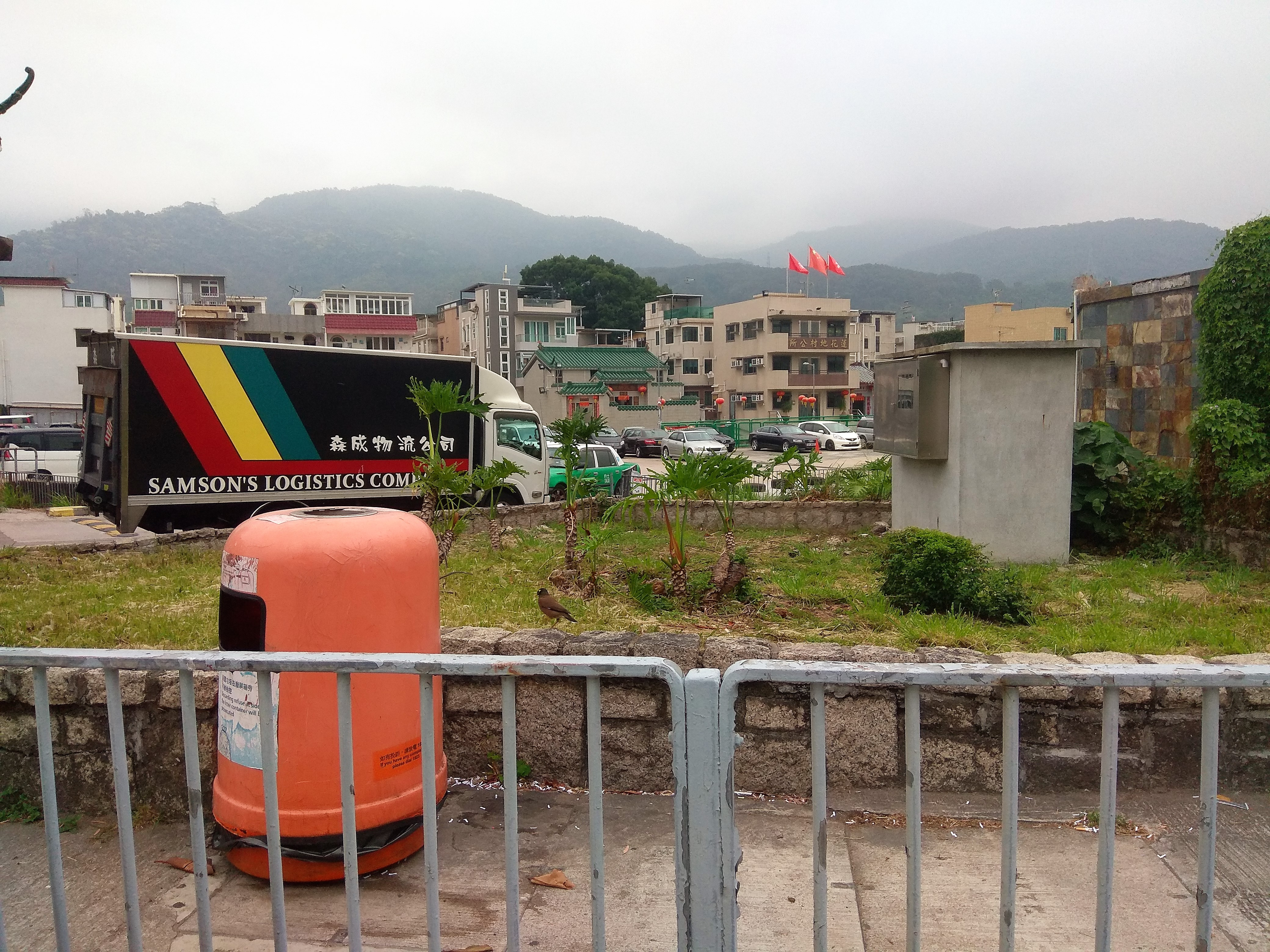
Lin Fa Tei viewed from Kam Sheung Road.

Lin Fa Tei (Chinese: 蓮花地) is a village in Pat Heung, Yuen Long District, Hong Kong.

Hop Shan Wai (合山圍) is a walled village that forms the core of Lin Fa Tei Village.

== Administration ==
Lin Fa Tei is a recognized village under the New Territories Small House Policy.

== History ==
In 2023, a resident of the village informed police about a crocodile, reportedly part of a crocodile and black kite rearing operation on private property in the village.

== See also ==
- Walled villages of Hong Kong
