= Edward Hewitt Nichols =

British agriculture and aquaculture official

Edward Hewitt Nichols CBE JP
- 李國士

Member of the Legislative Council
- In office 13 October 1976 – 30 January 1980
- Appointed by: Sir Murray MacLehose

Personal details
- Born: 29 December 1925 Newcastle upon Tyne, England, UK
- Died: 29 January 2016 (aged 90) Northumberland, England, UK
- Occupation: British agriculture and aquaculture official

Edward Hewitt Nichols CBE JP, (Chinese: 李國士, 29 December 1925 – 29 January 2016) was a British colonial agriculture and aquaculture official. Having served in Sierra Leone, he then worked in Hong Kong, where, from December 1965 to January 1980, he was the director of the territory's Agriculture and Fisheries Department. From October 1976 to January 1980, he was a member of the Legislative Council of Hong Kong. He was a major proponent of country parks in Hong Kong. He was also a regulator, and promoter, of cooperatives and credit unions.

Nichols graduated from Newcastle University, Queens' College, and the University of the West Indies, majoring in agriculture. In 1947, he joined the Colonial Office. He was sent to Sierra Leone and became director of agriculture there. Later, he was promoted to senior director in 1954 and head director in 1957. He mainly researched rice plantation. He participated in the production of Zoo Quest.

In 1959, Nichols went to Hong Kong to become the assistant director of the Agriculture and Fisheries Department. In December 1965, he replaced Jack Cater as the director. During his term, the agriculture and aquaculture industry was negatively affected by urbanisation and to address this, he actively promoted agriculture mechanisation and provided incentives to the industry to sustain production. To satisfy high demand of fish, he encouraged and supported Hong Kong fishermen to expand their operations and promoted replacing wind-powered ships with mechanised ones to increase efficiency. The gross domestic product of the industry increased from 200 million HKD to 1.1 billion HKD across his term.

In the early 1970s, Nichols called for awareness of importance of nature conservation, warning Hong Kong people not to "only care about short-term economic benefits while ignoring that we will be criticised in the future" (Chinese: 只顧目前和短期的經濟利益，而忽略將來受到歷史的批判). Murray MacLehose, upon being appointed as the governor of Hong Kong, actively investigated designating country parks and in 1976 the Hong Kong government passed the Country Parks Ordinance and Nichols became the head director of the Country Park Management Centre and the head chairperson of the Country and Marine Parks Board. Within four years, the Agriculture and Fisheries Department designated 21 country parks covering 40% of the land in Hong Kong. Nichols was also responsible for building infrastructure for country parks and setting foundations for the early operation of country parks. In 1980, the United Kingdom awarded him the Commander of the Most Excellent Order of the British Empire in recognition of his work in promoting the agriculture and aquaculture industry and developing country parks.

== Biography ==
=== Early life ===
Edward Nichols was born in Newcastle upon Tyne on 29 December 1925. His father was Edward E. Nichols and his mother was Mary Hewitt. He was educated in Newcastle University and later in Durham University in October 1924. He majored in agriculture. In June 1945, he was admitted a Bachelor of Science. In October 1945, he pursued further studies in Queens' College and obtained a diploma in agricultural science. In October 1946, he went to Port of Spain to study in University of the West Indies. In July 1947, he obtained an associate fellow degree.

=== Colonial career ===
In September 1947, Nichols was hired by the Colonial Office and joined the Sierra Leone colonial government to work as the director of agriculture in Njala, Moyamba. In 1951, he participated in the production of Zoo Quest. In January 1954, he was promoted to senior director of agriculture. From 1955 to 1957, he worked as the manager of a rice research centre in Rokupr and conducted large-scale rice plantation research projects. In December 1957, he was promoted to head director of agriculture, responsible for mechanising rice plantation in northern provinces of Sierra Leone. He acquired fluent use of the Temne language after working in Sierra Leone for twelve years. From 1956 to 1958, he was the assistant superintendent of police in Njala, Moyamba.

In February 1959, he moved to Hong Kong to become the assistant director of the Agriculture and Fisheries Department. He oversaw two renames of the department in 1960 and 1964. He mainly managed agricultural affairs. He participated in several international agriculture meetings. They include attending the Food and Agriculture Organization Rice Committee meeting twice respectively representing the Hong Kong government in Sri Lanka in December 1959 and the British government in Manila in December 1964; and attending a local policy meeting while staying in Manila. In July 1965, he went to London to attend the Commonwealth Agricultural Bureaux review meeting, representing Hong Kong and other territories. In addition, he was appointed the director of the department multiple times. From June 1960 to October 1960, June 1961 to October 1961, and April 1963 to October 1963, he was the director of the department.

=== Director of the Agriculture and Fisheries Department ===
==== Development of agriculture and aquaculture ====
In December 1965, Nichols succeeded Jack Cater as the director of the Agriculture and Fisheries Department. He was also the director of the Marketing Organization and the registrar of cooperatives. In April 1966, he was officially the director. In August 1966, he was appointed as a justice of the peace. During his term, the agriculture and aquaculture industry was facing many challenges. From the 1970s, as the Hong Kong government started to develop new towns in the New Territories, agricultural land use was reduced and abandoned rural land began to appear. With urbanisation, rural dwellers moved to urban areas, reducing manpower in the rural areas. Meanwhile, the production costs of agriculture and aquaculture rose while profits diminished. The 1970s energy crisis and competition from imports from Mainland China and other places also negatively impacted the industry.

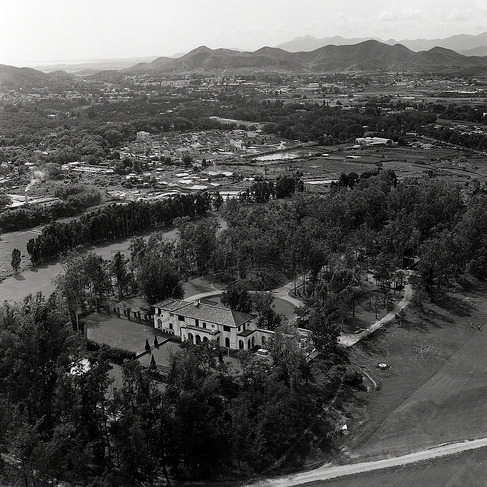
The surrounding of Fanling Lodge has a lot of arable land. (1973)

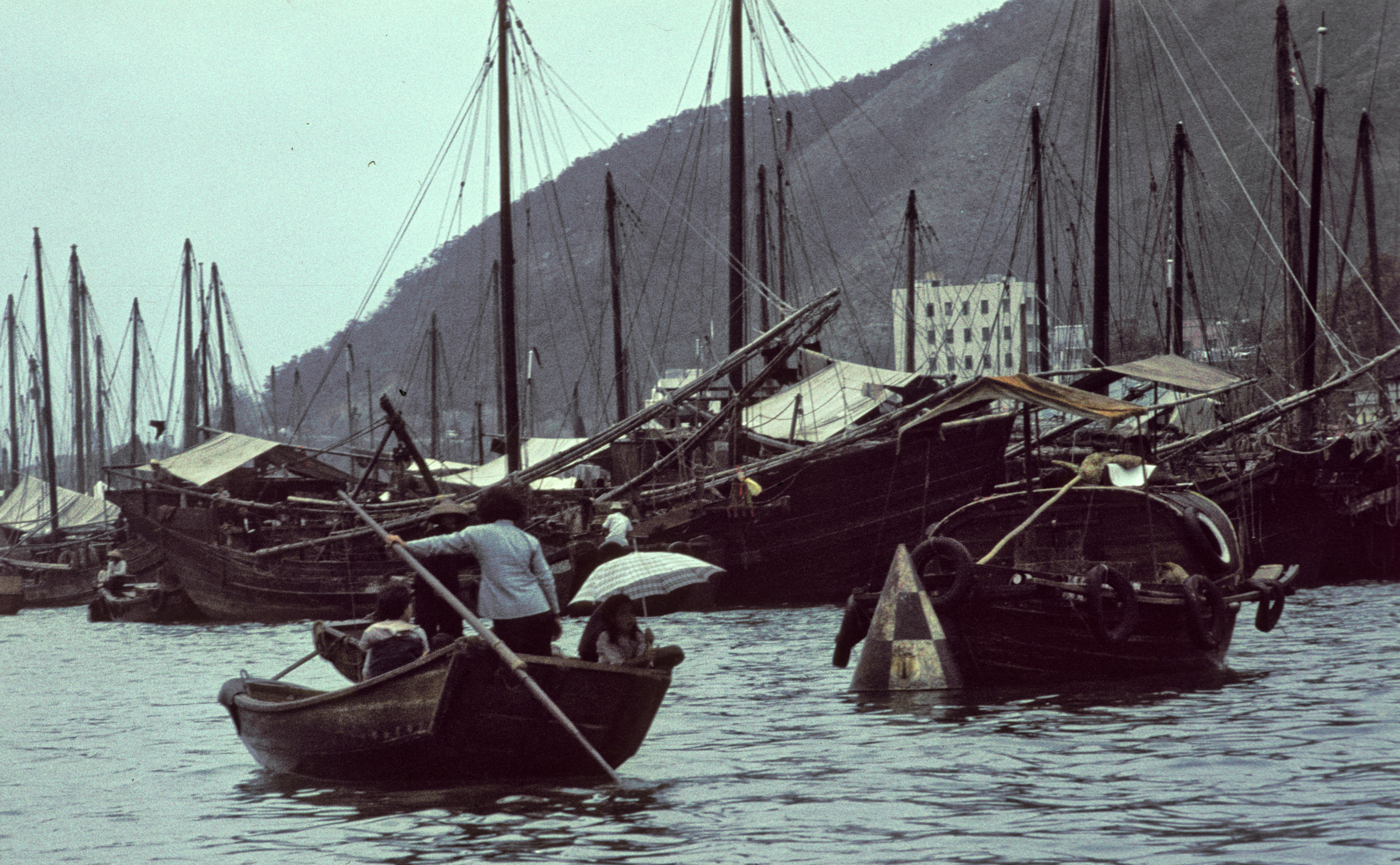
The seas of Hong Kong were filled with wind-powered fishing boats. (1965)

Nichols thought the agriculture and aquaculture industries were not completely self-sustaining, but had a certain importance. Therefore, he proposed using discreet policies to support the industry. He frequently visited rural areas to oversee development of the industry and attended local activities to foster public relationships. He also emphasised agriculture mechanisation. Through the Kadoorie Agricultural Aid Loan Fund and J.E. Joseph Trust Fund, he provided loans to farmers to increase productivity and efficiency. He also held vocational training classes to improve production means. In cooperation with the Kadoorie Agricultural Aid Association, the Agriculture and Fisheries Department also distributed equipment such as pesticides to increase production.

Meanwhile, as urban areas developed, Nichols oversaw the decline of rice planting in Hong Kong. The area of rice fields had decreased from 15000 hectares in 1965 to 2800 hectares in 1975 and 260 hectares in 1978. In the late 1970s, the rice industry almost disappeared. Jasmine rice farming was gone by the 1980s. To help farmers switch jobs, he encouraged them to farm vegetables and pigs. Before he became director, he had already established Operation Feedbag in cooperation with Care USA to provide interest-free loans to local pig farmers. Apart from promoting mechanisation, he co-organised farming exhibitions to promote local farm produce to improve farming infrastructure. Examples include spending 216000 HKD on an irrigation plan in Pat Heung, setting up 13000-feet-long water pipes starting from Ho Pui Reservoir connecting Ho Pui, Ma On Kong, Tai Wo, Tai Kek, Cheung Po, and other areas in order to irrigate 675000 square metres of farmland, providing a stable irrigation water supply for vegetable farmers in Pat Heung.

The demand for fish was traditionally high for Hong Kong people. According to statistics, in 1974, 12.5–13 kg of fish was eaten per person globally, but it was 33–35 kg for Hong Kong people, which is far higher than the global average and is only surpassed by Iceland, Portugal, and Japan. To satisfy fish demand, Nichols encouraged development of the aquaculture industry. He also encouraged Hong Kong people to consume mesopelagic fish and fish from foreign waters to supplement the deficit in demersal fish and fish from local waters. In particular, due to technical and knowledge restrictions, although the South China Sea had many mesopelagic fish, they were rarely exploited. In light of this, Nichols encouraged the aquaculture industry to exploit ocean resources there. Through working in the United Nations South China Aquaculture Development Planning Committee, he helped local fishers discover additional fishing grounds. Apart from providing loans to fishermen, he also subsidised the large-scale replacement of traditional fishing boats with motorised ones in conjunction with the plan of exploiting mesopelagic fish. He also paid attention to educating children of fishermen, increasing the number of schools for them to 13 and setting up practical secondary schools and other scholarships to support the long-term development of the industry.

During Nichols' 15-year term as the director of the Agriculture and Fisheries Department from 1965 to 1980, the population of Hong Kong increased from 3.7 million to 5 million. In the same period, the working population increased from 1.4 million to 2.5 million, but those in the aquaculture industry decreased from 73 thousand to 48 thousand, and the percentage relative to the working population decreased from 5.21% to 1.92%. The GDP percentage of the local aquaculture industry decreased from 2% to 1%, the GDP increasing from 200 million HKD in 1965 to 1.1 billion HKD in 1980. In the same period, vegetable production annually increased from 130 thousand metric tons to 190 thousand metric tons, though the market share decreased slightly from 50% to 40%. Local pig production annually increased from 385 thousand to 450 thousand, with the market share staying around 10% to 20%. Local poultry production annually increased from 5 million to 15 million, with market share increasing from about 30% to almost 70%. Fresh fish sold through the Fish Marketing Organisation annually increased from 50 thousand metric tons to 75 thousand metric tons, with market share staying above 90%. Considering Hong Kong's status as a high population density city, the agriculture and aquaculture industry reached levels of developed countries like Japan and the United Kingdom in terms of self-sustainability.

In other areas, the local agriculture and aquaculture significantly developed. From 1965 to 1980, the Hong Kong government's aquaculture and agriculture funds increased respectively from 1 million HKD and 2 million HKD to 14 million HKD and 9.45 million HKD. Granted aquaculture and agriculture loans annually increased respectively from 0.83 million HKD and 1.9 million HKD to 5.94 million HKD and 11.5 million HKD. Under Nichols' effort, the number of wind-powered fishing boats decreased from 7000 to 350, while that of motorised fishing boats increased from 2700 to 5000. By 1980, the number of farmers using cultivators was more than 2900, while the number of farms with automatic irrigation was almost 2000.

==== Cooperatives and credit unions ====
Besides agriculture and aquaculture, Nichols, also a registrar of cooperatives, supported the cooperative movement in Hong Kong during his term as director. The modern cooperative movement began in the United Kingdom in 1844, and was introduced into Hong Kong via Jack Cater, the first registrar of cooperatives. The goal of cooperatives was to run businesses together in a fair way, compensating individual weaknesses via working together and unleashing the potential of groups to increase production efficiency. Until 1979, Hong Kong had over 400 cooperatives with 22000 employed. Over 200 of them were urban cooperatives and 20 of them were agriculture and aquaculture cooperatives that provided customisable house building, savings, and other welfare services. Over 100 of them were agriculture and aquaculture cooperatives, which played an important role in helping the Agriculture and Fisheries Department implement aquaculture policies and distribute loans to farmers. Some agriculture and aquaculture cooperatives spent funds building fishermen's villages with help of the department. For example, the fishermen's village in Hang Hau, completed in 1971, was funded by the United Nations High Commissioner for Refugees and West Germany with the help of the department.

Nichols also oversaw the rise of credit unions in Hong Kong. The modern credit union movement started in 1852. Its operational mode is similar to cooperatives, and is different from rotating savings and credit associations. Credit union is a non-profit organisation where members voluntarily and fairly, with mutual assistance in mind, encourage other members to cultivate habits of thrifting and saving. Members are given shares proportional to their contributions. Collected funds are usually stored in banks to earn interest or lend low-interest loans so that members can afford daily expenditures while earning interest. In 1962, credit unions were introduced into Hong Kong. In 1964, the first credit union was established. As the credit union movement developed quickly, eight credit unions in Hong Kong established the Credit Union League of Hong Kong to further promote the movement. At the same time, in order to regulate credit unions, the Hong Kong government legislated the Credit Unions Ordinance in 1968 so that credit unions were under lawful protection. Starting from 1970, Nichols was appointed the first registrar of the league, responsible for the registration of credit unions and their constitutions, review, and guidance. Until 1978, Hong Kong had 55 credit unions, with many of them formed by staff of large private organisations and the Hong Kong Civil Service.

==== Establishment of country parks ====
姑勿論如何演變，我們斷不能將時代的巨鐘倒撥，回復到昔日傳統性的鄉村生活方式，正如我們不能將美麗的昆蟲或花朵放置在琥珀上一樣去保持這種田園生活。如果準備付出不可避免的代價，那麼我們所能做到的就只有決定「怎樣限制鄉村都市化」的發展而已。同時，我們更須了解到我們的下一代將來會從質與量的角度來鑑定我們留給他們的產業，本人深感為憾，然而又必須坦白說明的，就是我們以往過份只顧目前與及短期的經濟利益，而忽略將來受到歷史的批判。

No matter what happens, we cannot reverse in time and return to the old traditional rural living ways like how we cannot put a beautiful insect or flower inside an amber to maintain a country lifestyle. If we are ready to pay the inevitable cost, then we can only determine the development of "how to limit urbanisation". At the same time, we must know that our next generation will rate our legacy in quality and quantity. I am sorry but I have to say that we used to only care about short-term economic benefits while ignoring that we will be criticised in the future.

— Edward Hewitt Nichols, speech at a regular meeting in Tsuen Mun and Peninsula Lions Clubs on 4 February 1972

Establishing and managing country parks in Hong Kong was an important aspect of Nichols' work. From the early 1960s, the Agriculture and Fisheries Department started researching the conservation of wild areas in Hong Kong. In 1965, the department invited L. M. Talbot and his wife to conduct a survey. In the same year, they submitted Conservation of the Hong Kong Countryside, setting a foundation for the later country park policies of the Hong Kong government. In March 1967, David Trench, the then Governor of Hong Kong, established the Provisional Council for the Use and Conservation of the Countryside, which published a report named The Countryside and the People in 1968, further reviewing the need of natural recreation and conservation. In response to the report, the government established two consultation committees respectively responsible for the development of natural recreation and a five-year natural conservation plan. The government also used the Sir David Trench Fund to set up a small country park by the Shing Mun Reservoir as an experiment. The country park policies gradually came into existence.

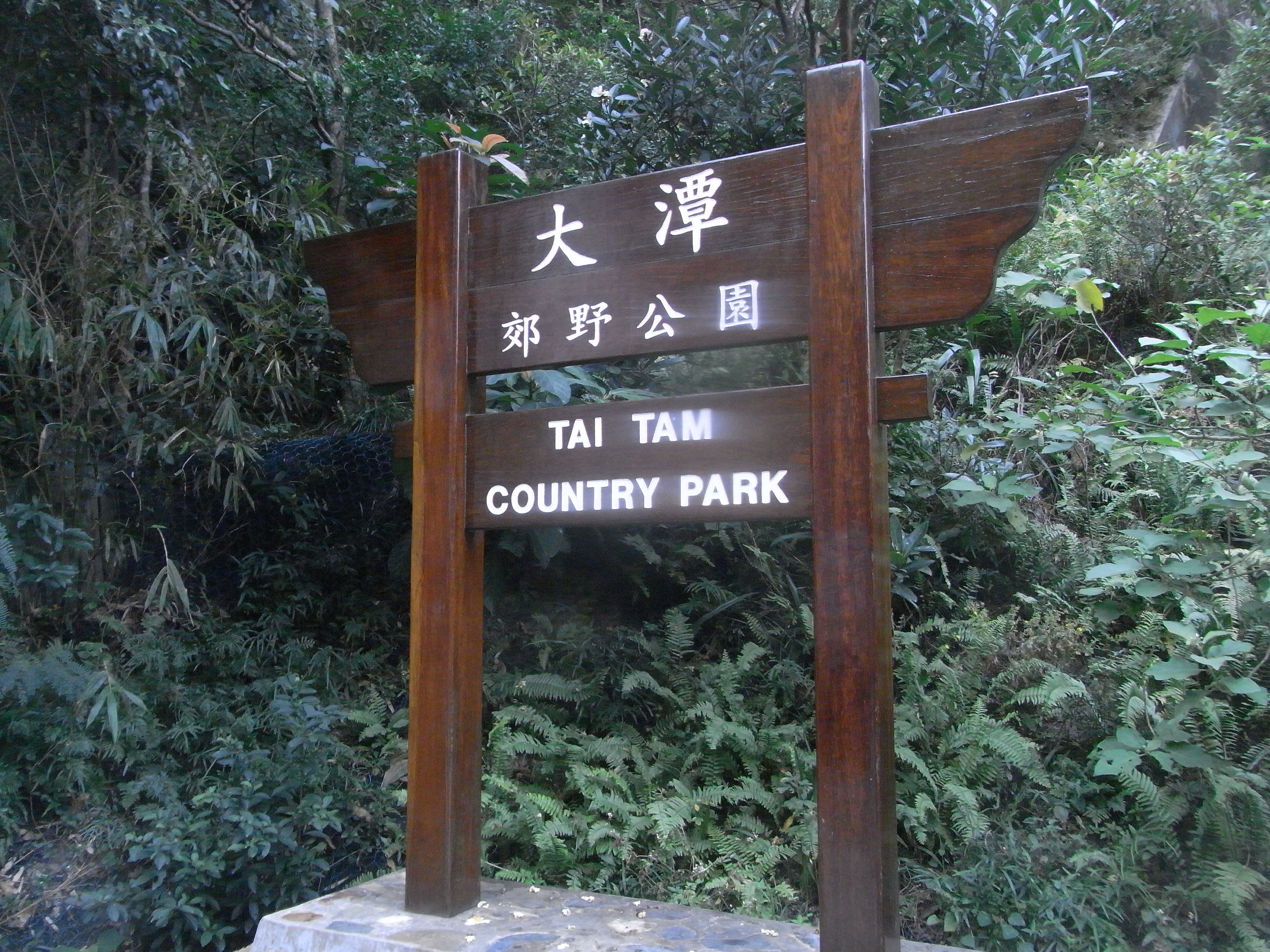
The Tai Tam Country Park was established in 1977.

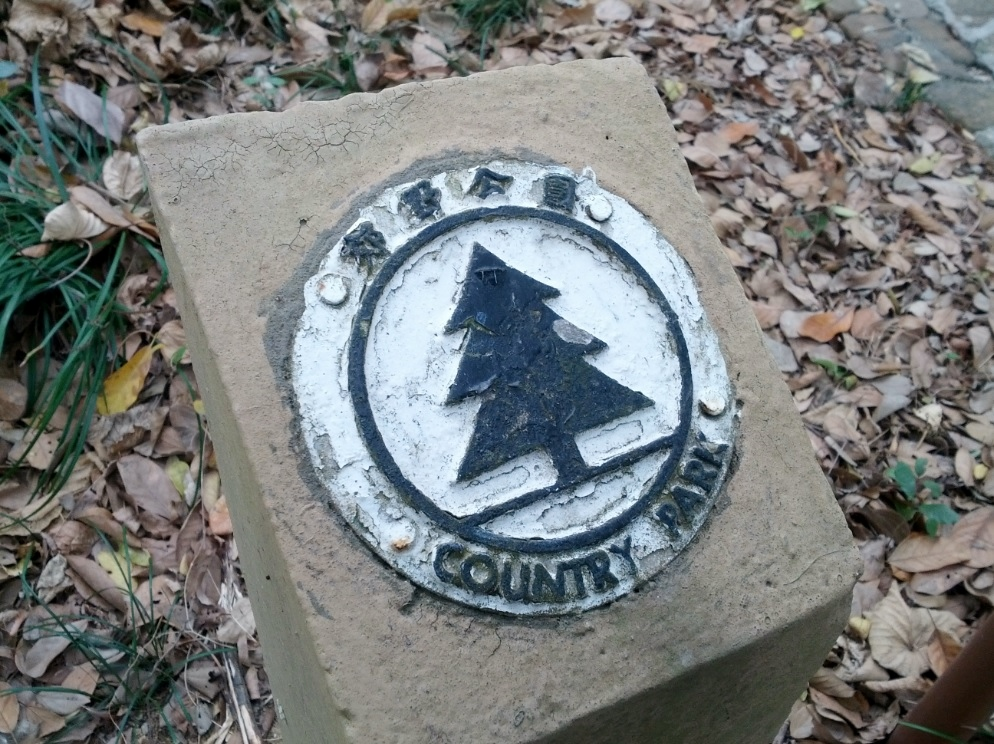
Early logo of Hong Kong country parks in Plover Cove Country Park, before the addition of the lower waves representing oceans.

Nichols was very supportive of the conservation of rural areas in Hong Kong. He had served as the chairperson of the Natural Conservation Working Group of the Agriculture and Fisheries Department. He actively promoted Hong Kong Tree Planting Day. In the early 1970s, Nichols called for awareness of the importance of nature conservation, warning Hong Kong people not to "only care about short-term economic benefits while ignoring that we will be criticised in the future" (Chinese: 只顧目前和短期的經濟利益，而忽略將來受到歷史的批判). Within his term, he pointed out many times that half of the Hong Kong population were teenagers under the age of 25, with four million citizens living in a 130-square-kilometre urban area; expanding country parks could help teenagers and citizens unwind and, in the long term, relieve social discontent caused by the 1967 Hong Kong riots. In 1971, after Murray MacLehose had become Governor of Hong Kong, country parks in Hong Kong were significantly developed. MacLehose said, "Everyone can enjoy nature, but only some can enjoy golf courses and yachts." (Chinese: 青山綠水普羅大眾都可享受，高爾夫球場和遊艇則只屬於少數人的玩意) Under MacLehose's lead, in August 1976, the Hong Kong government legislated the Country Parks Ordinance and officially established the Country and Marine Parks Authority and the Country and Marine Parks Board, responsible for designating and managing country parks. Nichols became the first supervisor of the former and first chairperson of the latter.

Nichols designated large parts of Hong Kong's rural land as country parks. The first three country parks in Hong Kong, the Shing Mun Country Park, Shing Mun Country Park, and Kam Shan Country Park, were designated in July 1977. The second batch of country parks, the Aberdeen Country Park and Tai Tam Country Park, were designated in October 1977. In 1978, the Hong Kong government spent 70 million HKD on the running costs of key country parks in the next four years. In the first year, over 3.6 million visits were recorded. In 1980, there were 21 country parks, occupying 40% of 1105 square kilometre of land in Hong Kong.

In 1979, the Agriculture and Fisheries Department constructed the MacLehose Trail, the first hiking trail in Hong Kong, stretching across the New Territories. Under the protection of the Country Park Ordinance, areas in country parks cannot be exploited at will, important in protecting Hong Kong's natural environment. Initially, there was criticism of insufficient promotion and lack of basic infrastructure in country parks. As a result, Nichols actively promoted visiting the country parks to citizens and built features like tourist centres, reporting centres, public toilets, rain shelters, road signs, camps, barbeque grills, and recreational equipment, making country parks in Hong Kong better developed. He designated many country parks in several years and built a complete country park system. When Nichols stepped down, MacLehose praised him for being "a preserver of Hong Kong's countryside, and an organiser of recreation in it" (Chinese: 香港郊野的保存者和郊野康樂的組織者).

==== Other work ====
During his term as the director of the Agriculture and Fisheries Department, Nichols was the chairperson of the Marketing Advisory Board, chairperson of the Reference of the Fisheries Development Loan Fund Advisory Committee and Advisory Committee for the Protection of Rare Animals and Plants, member of the Food Supply and Distribution Committee, Pesticide Advisory Committee, Science Advancement Committee, and Environmental Advisory Committee. He was also the chairperson of Kadoorie Agricultural Aid Loan Fund Committee, trustee of the J.E. Joseph Trust Fund, member of the Hong Kong Agricultural Development Association, director of the Hong Kong Productivity Council, chairperson of the Chinese University of Hong Kong Agriculture Research Group Advisory Committee, member of the Urban Council Museum and Arts (Natural History) Affairs Committee, and member of the New Life Psychiatric Rehabilitation Association Advisory Committee. From October 1976 to January 1980, he was a member of the Legislative Council of Hong Kong.

As an agricultural expert, Nichols attended many international agriculture and aquaculture conferences. In September 1966, he went to Seoul to attend a regional meeting of the Food and Agriculture Organization of the United Nations, representing the Hong Kong and United Kingdom governments. In November 1966, he attended a management conference of the Food and Agriculture Organization of the United Nations in Rome, representing the Hong Kong government. In April 1969, he attended an Asian Development Bank regional agriculture policy research conference in Sydney and the 13th International Commission on Irrigation & Drainage meeting in Mexico City. In October 1974, he attended the Indo-Pacific Fish Conference in Jakarta. He was very active in the Indo-Pacific Fish Committee and United Nations South China Aquaculture Development Planning Committee, communicating with representatives of other governments.

Since 1962, the Agriculture and Fisheries Department has cooperated with the Hong Kong Life Saving Society to recognise fishermen who save drowning people. As a member of the Royal Life Saving Society, Nichols supported the lifesaving movement in Hong Kong, encouraging fishermen to save lives. From 1962 to 1980, Hong Kong fishermen saved more than 1,800 people, many of whom were Vietnamese boat people. The Royal Life Saving Society Hong Kong awarded Nichols a medal, affirming his work in supporting the movement.

When Nichols was first the director of the Agriculture and Fisheries Department, the department was composed of the head office, agricultural and forestry division, aquaculture division, and livestock division. As the department developed, there were many structural changes. Major changes included reorganising the department to compose the head office, agricultural division, and aquaculture division; and creating the natural conservation and country park division, responsible for country park affairs. At the same time, the department moved locations many times in conjunction with expansion of the department. In 1964, the head office and the agricultural and forestry division were in the North Kowloon Magistracy, while the aquaculture and veterinary divisions were in the Li Po Chun Chambers. After Nichols became director, the department unilaterally moved to the third floor of the newly completed Cambridge Court. In 1971, the department moved to the newly constructed Canton Road Government Offices.

=== Later life ===
In January 1980, Nichols, aged 54, stepped down as the director of the Agricultural and Fisheries Department to prepare for retirement. John Morrison Riddell-Swan, the then deputy director, succeeded him as the director. Nichols had worked in colonial roles for 33 years, with 21 years spent in Hong Kong. To affirm his work in aquaculture and natural conservation, the United Kingdom awarded him the honour of OBE in 1972 and CBE in 1980. He was also awarded the Silver Jubilee of Elizabeth II in 1977.

Leaving Hong Kong, Nichols returned to Northumberland to settle. He was hired as an advisor of the Food and Agriculture Organization. In 1981, he was responsible for researching technical cooperation in aquaculture in developing countries. Later, he reviewed the long-term finance of the Bay of Bengal Programme. The project was organised by the Food and Agriculture Organization and Swedish International Development Cooperation Agency. Its goal was to develop aquaculture in countries in the Bay of Bengal such as Bangladesh, India, Malaysia, Sri Lanka, and Thailand. He was a frequent donor to Queens' College.

On 29 January 2016, Nichols died in Northumberland, aged 90. His body was cremated in Newcastle upon Tyne on 15 February 2016.

== Personal life ==
Nichols was a follower of the Church of England. On 9 June 1951, he married Annie Audrey Muse in St Andrew's Church, Newcastle upon Tyne. They had a daughter. His interests covered a large variety of topics, including natural history, archaeology, anthropology, birdwatching, stamp collecting, golfing, and jogging. Apart from being fluent in the Temne language, he also spoke French.

Nichols was a member of the Council for British Archaeology, Wildfowl & Wetlands Trust, and Northumberland Wildlife Trust. While in Hong Kong, he was a member of the Hong Kong Golf Club, Hong Kong Jockey Club, and Ladies Recreation Club, Royal Asiatic Society Hong Kong Branch, and Kadoorie Agricultural Aid Association.

== Honours ==
- The following lists the full names and abbreviations of his honours:
  - Justice of the peace (J.P.) (10 August 1966)
  - Officer of the Most Excellent Order of the British Empire (O.B.E.) (1972 Birthday Honours)
  - Silver Jubilee of Elizabeth II (1977)
  - Commander of the Most Excellent Order of the British Empire (C.B.E.) (1980 Birthday Honours)

== See also ==
- Agriculture and aquaculture in Hong Kong
- Conservation in Hong Kong
- David Attenborough
- Jack Cater
- Murray MacLehose, Baron MacLehose of Beoch
- John Morrison Riddell-Swan

Government offices
| Preceded by Jack Cater | Director of Agriculture, Fisheries and Conservation; December 1965 – January 1980 | Succeeded by John Morrison Riddell-Swan |
