= Edward Nichols =

Edward Nichols, or similar names, may refer to:

- Edward Nicholls (captain) (fl. 1617), English sea captain
- Edward Nicolls (1779–1865), Irish general of the British Royal Marines
- Edward Hugh Dyneley Nicolls, British engineer
- Edward T. Nichols (1823–1886), U.S. Navy rear admiral
- Edward Leamington Nichols (1854–1937), physicist
- Edward Nicholl (1862–1939), British navy officer and MP
- Edward Hall Nichols (1864–1922), American surgeon
- Ed Nichols (1923–2020), New Zealand alpine skier
- Edward Hewitt Nichols (1923–2016), British colonial agriculture and aquaculture official
- Eddie Nicholls (born 1947), cricket umpire
