= Ho Pui =

Ho Pui (Chinese: 河背) or Ho Pui Tsuen (河背村) is the same of several places in Hong Kong:

- Ho Pui (North District), in North District, Hong Kong
- Ho Pui Tsuen (Tsuen Wan District), in Tai Wo Hau, Tsuen Wan District
- Ho Pui (Yuen Long District), in Yuen Long District
- Ho Pui Reservoir, an irrigation reservoir in Hong Kong
