= Newcastle Gaol =

Former judicial building in Newcastle upon Tyne, England

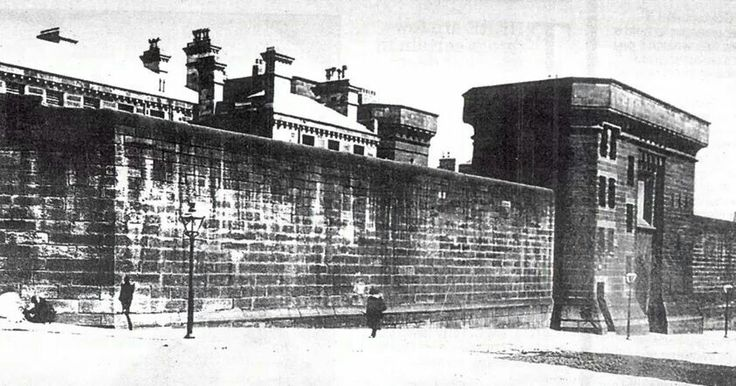
- Newcastle Gaol

- Shown in Tyne and Wear
- 54.9732°N 1.6100°W
- Location: Carliol Square, Newcastle upon Tyne

History
- Built: 1828

Site notes
- Architect: John Dobson
- Architectural style: Fortress Gothic Revival Style

Newcastle Gaol was a custodial building in Carliol Square in Newcastle upon Tyne, Tyne and Wear, England. The building, which was the principal prison for the local area, was demolished in 1925.

== History ==
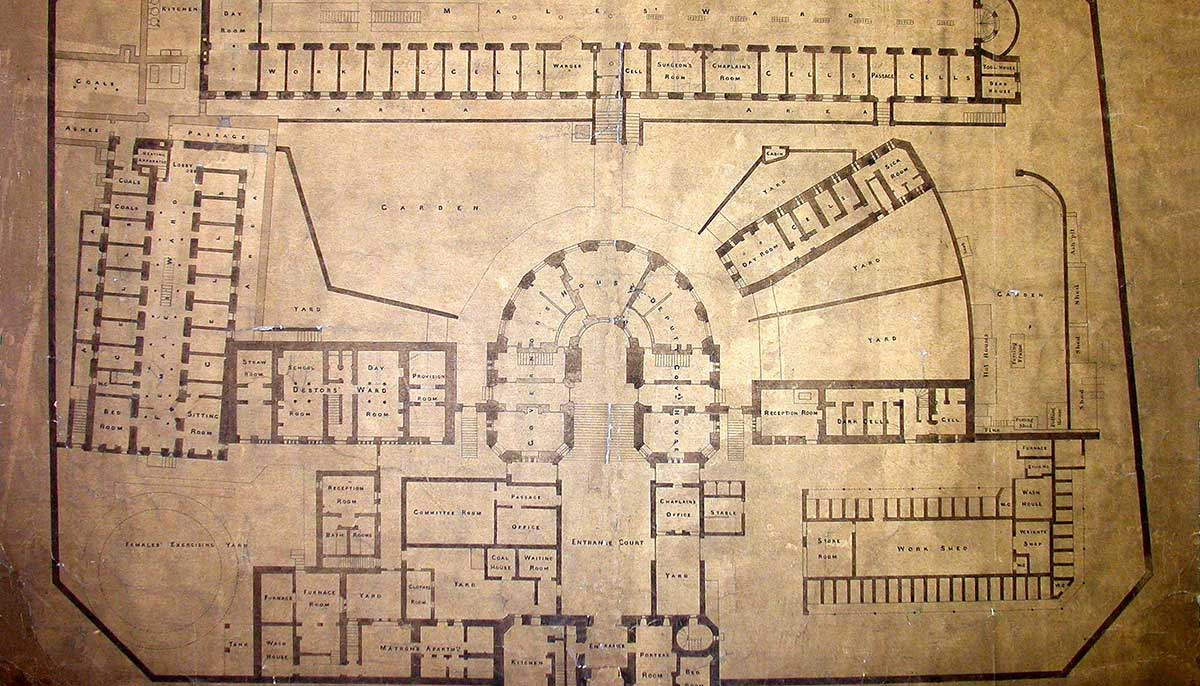
Internal plan of the gaol

Newcastle Gaol was commissioned to replace the New Gate Gaol which dated from the 14th century. By 1820, that prison was described by the grand jury at Newcastle assizes "as being out of repair and inconvenient, insufficient, and insecure." The site they chose for the new prison was Carliol Croft, a piece of open land in the east part of central Newcastle.

The foundation stone for the new building was laid by the mayor, Robert Bell, on 4 June 1823. It was designed by John Dobson in the Fortress Gothic Revival Style, built in ashlar stone at a cost of £35,000 and was completed in February 1828. The design involved a tall entrance tower with a gateway, behind which there was an elliptical main prison building with six radiating wings in the style of a panopticon. Due to high construction costs only five wings were actually built.

Following the implementation of the Capital Punishment Amendment Act 1868, which abolished the practice of public executions, John William Anderson, who had been convicted of murdering his wife, became the first person to be executed inside the prison in December 1875.

By 1856 the prison was holding twice as many inmates as it had been designed for. In order to increase the capacity of the prison, the radiating wings were demolished in 1858 to make way for a single four-storey prison block. In 1878 the Home Office took over management of the prison and it was renamed HM Prison Newcastle upon Tyne. Over-crowding increased in 1881, after Morpeth Gaol closed, and, by 1890, the building was accommodating 300 prisoners, three times as many as it was designed for, in very cramped conditions.

Notable prisoners included the suffragette, Lady Constance Bulwer-Lytton, who was tried and convicted of disorderly behaviour after she threw a stone at a ministerial car during a visit to Newcastle by the Chancellor of the Exchequer, David Lloyd George, in October 1909. She was sentenced to one month in the prison and was subjected to force-feeding while on hunger strike. John Dickman, who was convicted of murdering a wages courier on a train, became one of the last people to be executed in the prison, in August 1910. The final executions were of two murderers, Ambrose Quinn and Ernest Bernard Scott, which took place in November 1919.

The constrained nature of the site meant there was very little room for expansion, and the prison was demolished in April 1925. The site was subsequently occupied by Telephone House, a structure commissioned to accommodate the Newcastle telephone exchange.
