= Thomas Albion Alderson =

British organist and composer (1843–1902)

Thomas Albion Alderson (13 November 1843 – 5 February 1902) was an organist and composer based in Newcastle-upon-Tyne.

== Life ==
He married Elizabeth Mary Eltringham (26 April 1843 - February 1912) on 24 June 1867 in Holy Trinity Church, South Shields. They had 6 children.

- Charles Frederick Alderson (b. 1868)
- Albion Percy Alderson (1871 - 4 March 1936)
- Wilfred Ernest Alderson (3 June 1873 – 3 September 1949)
- Reginald Alderson (b.1879)
- Florence Alderson (b.1875)
- Lilian Maud Alderson (13 June 1876 – 29 March 1923)

== Appointments ==
- Organist at St Andrew's Church, Newcastle upon Tyne 1867 – 1902

== Compositions ==
He wrote many songs and pieces for piano including

- Dance of the Naiads, for the Pianoforte (1869)
- Dreamland romance for the Pianoforte (1869)
- May Blossoms, morceaux de salon pour Piano (1869)
- Smiles and Tears. Song (1869)
- Tarantella for the Pianoforte (1869)
- Hawarden March for the Pianoforte (1869)
- Rosabelle, grand galop de concert pour Piano (1869)
- Spring Flowers, mazurka for the Pianoforte (1869)
- Starlight, notturno for the Pianoforte (1869)
- The Streamlet, sketch for the Pianoforte (1870)
- Carine, polka brillante for the Pianoforte (1870)
- Rosina, valse brillante pour Piano (1870)
- Go ask the bird to live with thee. Song (1870)
- Hilda, serenade for the Pianoforte (1871)
- Violets, mazurka for the Pianoforte (1871)
- The Willow Song [begins: "Down the River] (1871)
- Holly Berries. Song, words by F. Dudley (1873)
- My Song shall be of mercy and judgement. Anthem (1882)
- Dreamland. Romance for pianoforte & violin (1884)
