= St Andrew's Church, Newcastle upon Tyne =

Church in Tyne and Wear, England

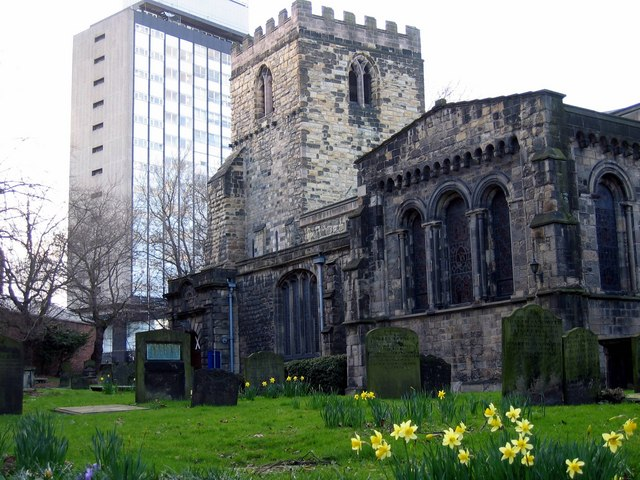
- St Andrew's Church, Newcastle upon Tyne
- St Andrew's Church, Newcastle upon Tyne
- 54°58′25.2″N 1°37′7.91″W
- OS grid reference: NZ 24545 64412
- Location: Newgate Street, Newcastle upon Tyne NE1 5SS
- Country: England
- Denomination: Church of England
- Website: standrewsnewcastle.org.uk

Administration
- Diocese: Diocese of Newcastle
- Archdeaconry: Northumberland
- Deanery: Newcastle (Central)

St Andrew's Church, Newcastle upon Tyne is a Grade I listed parish church in the Church of England in Newcastle upon Tyne, Tyne and Wear, England.

== History ==
The church dates from the 12th century, but is mainly of 13th and 14th century construction. The porch was re-fronted in 1726. Other restoration work was undertaken in 1866 by Fowler.

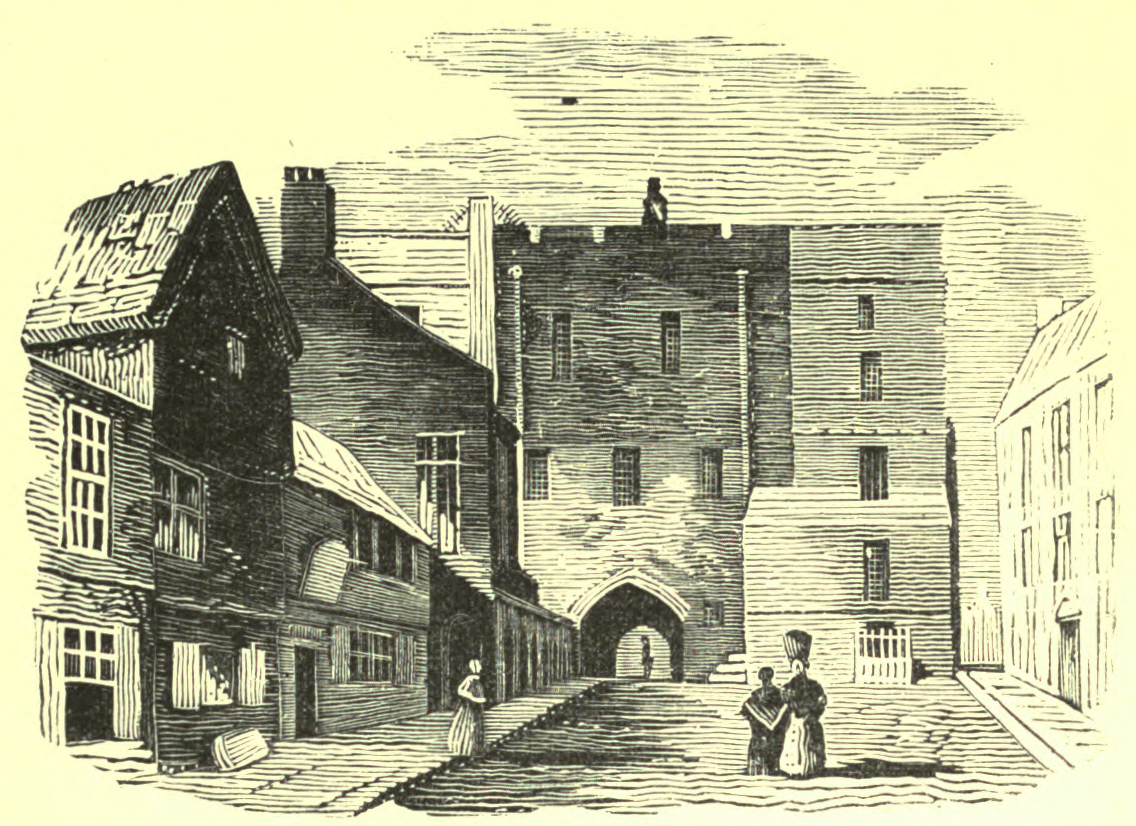
The New Gate, Newcastle in 1813, ten years before its demolition. St Andrew's Church stood close by to the west.

A large section of the medieval Newcastle town wall still survives immediately to the north of the church, and the imposing New Gate in the city wall stood close by to the east until its demolition in 1823. Newgate Street to which it gave its name still runs past the east end of the church.

== Burials ==
- The Newcastle-born portrait painter William Bell was buried at the church in June 1794.
- The Newcastle-born composer Charles Avison was buried by the north porch in 1795.

== Organ ==
The earliest records of organs are from 1783 when an organ was installed by Donaldson. Subsequent restorations have been carried out by Gray, Nicholson, Binns and Harrison and Harrison.

A specification of the organ can be found on the National Pipe Organ Register.

=== Organists ===
- Thomas Hawdon 1783
- George Barron 1783 - 1787
- George Carr 1787 - 1790
- Thomas Wright 1790 - 1796
- Henry Munro (or Monro) 1796 - 1819
- James Stimpson 1836 - 1841
- Samuel Reay 1841 - 1845
- J.S. Liddle ca. 1852
- Mr. Wish 1864 - ????
- Thomas Albion Alderson 1867 - 1902
- Harold Oswald ca. 1916

== Bells ==
In the tower hangs six bells all cast by Mears and Stainbank in 1966. The largest weighs 16.5 cwt or 844 kg.
