= New Gate, Newcastle =

City gate in Newcastle upon Tyne, England

Coordinates: 54.97417°N 1.61724°W

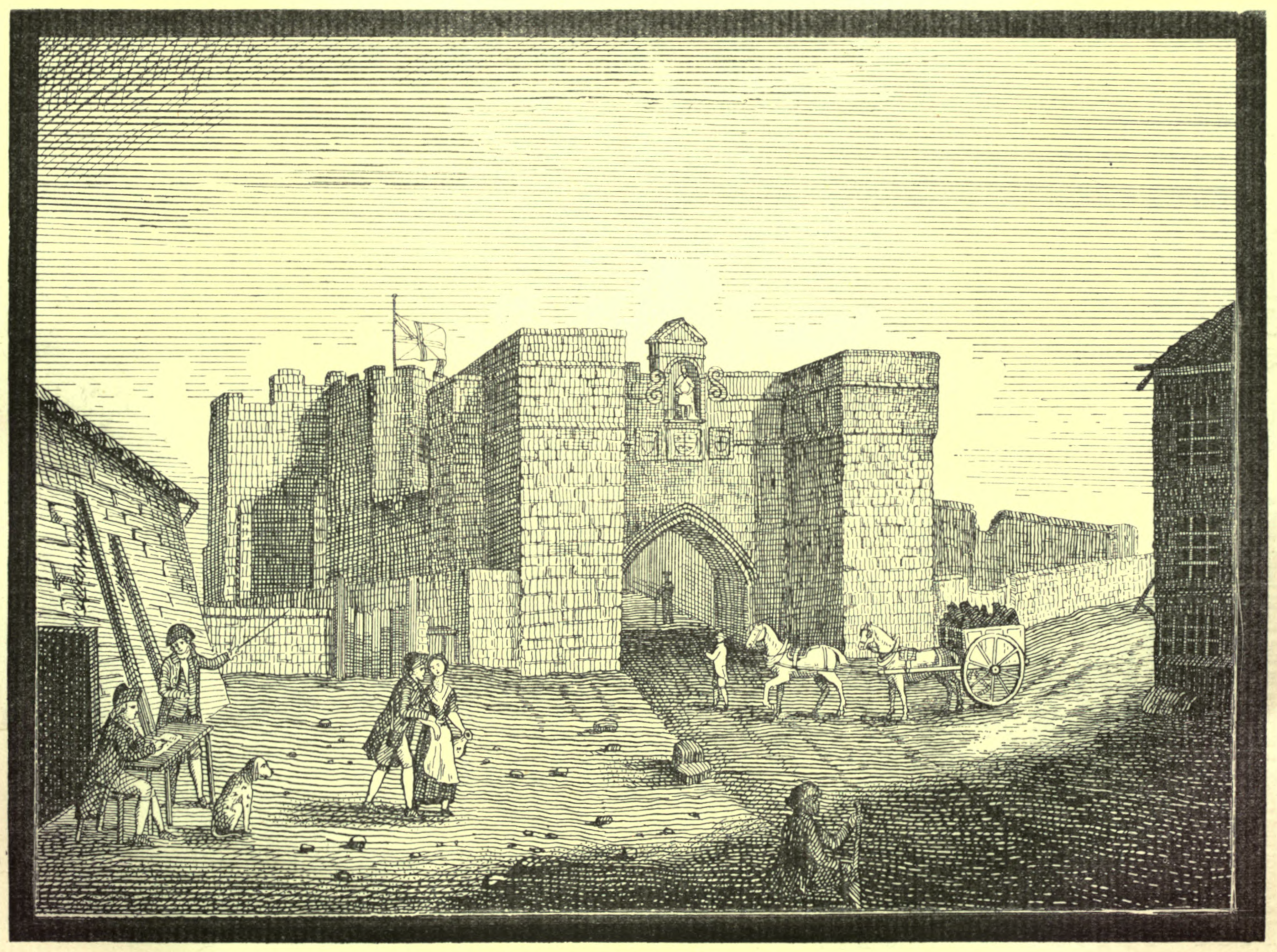
The New Gate in 1789

The New Gate of Newcastle upon Tyne, England, was a city gate on the north stretch of Newcastle town wall, dating to the fourteenth century or before, which for centuries housed a gaol. It gave its name to Newgate Street in Newcastle, but was demolished in 1823.

== History ==
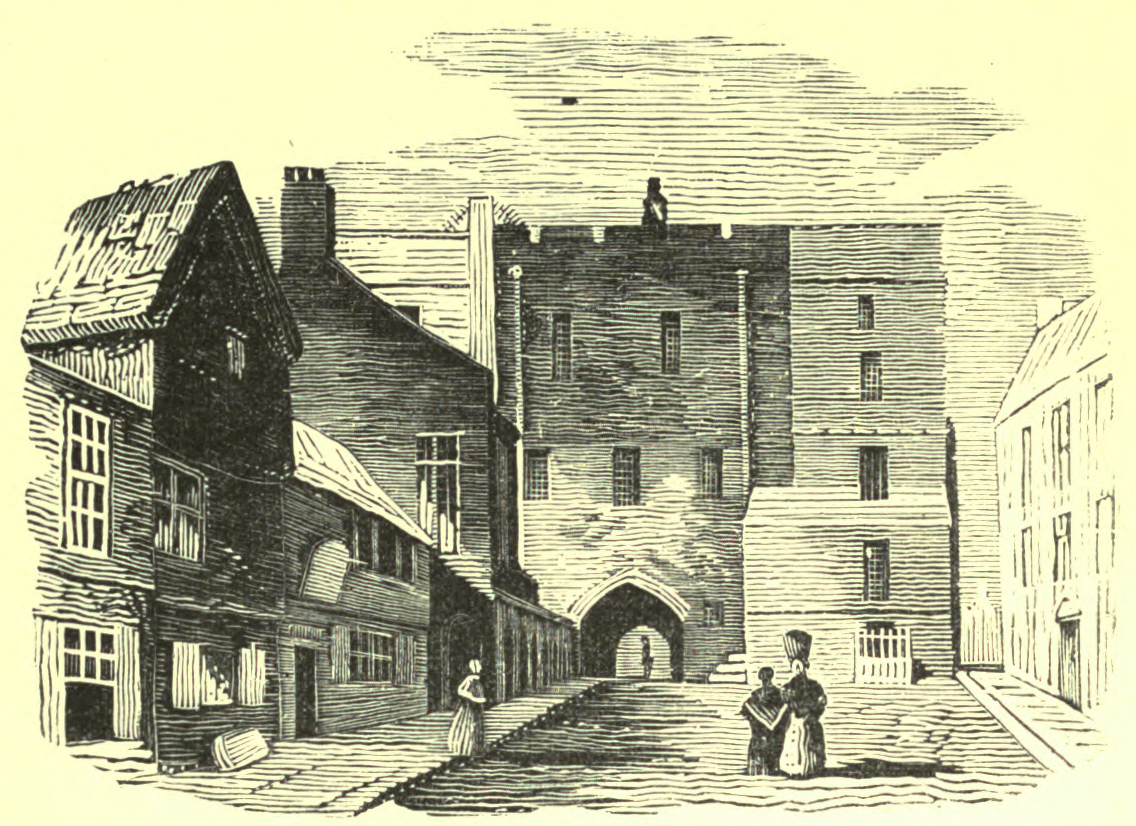
New Gate in 1813

Newcastle's town walls were constructed in the 13th and 14th centuries. The New Gate of Newcastle, occupying a position on a northern section of wall, is mentioned as far back as the fourteenth century. From its name, it has been surmised that it stood on the site of an older structure; Eneas Mackenzie expressed the opinion that this latter must have been the Berwick Gate.

The south front was the most ancient part of Newgate. Its architecture was of the same style as that of the inner ward of Alnwick Castle. The north front was intended as an outwork to the defences of the main gate, and had a gallery on each side, facilitating attack on assailants who had passed the first entrance. On this front were three ancient shields of arms, being St. George's cross; the arms of England, with the fleurs de lis semée; and those of Newcastle. In later times there was above the south front a statue of James VI and I, placed under an arch, and having a crown and robes, a sceptre in the right hand, and a globe in the left.

The gate was used as a prison from 1399.

In 1746, Prince William, Duke of Cumberland, entered Newcastle through the New Gate after his victory over the Jacobite Army at the Battle of Culloden.

By 1820, New Gate was "presented" at a Newcastle Assizes by the grand jury "as being out of repair and inconvenient, insufficient, and insecure." This led to the building of a new prison in Carliol Croft, to which the felons were gradually removed, whilst the debtors were transferred to the Castle. In June, 1823, workmen began to pull down the east wing of Newgate, which was followed by the removal of the west wing; and the north wing was then demolished. The most ancient part of the Gate still remained, and a vigorous effort was made to save it from destruction. It was proposed to form a carriage-road and footpath on each side of the old gateway, which was to be converted into halls for such incorporated companies as might need them. But the authorities would not hear of this. They wanted the old stones for the new prison; and so, in September 1823, part of the remaining walls were blown down with gunpowder. The rest were more easily removed. The portcullis was found in a perfect state; it was removed to Matthew White Ridley, 1st Viscount Ridley grounds at Blagdon Hall. During the demolition, several cannon-balls were found, deep sunk in the wall.

== Jeu d'esprit ==
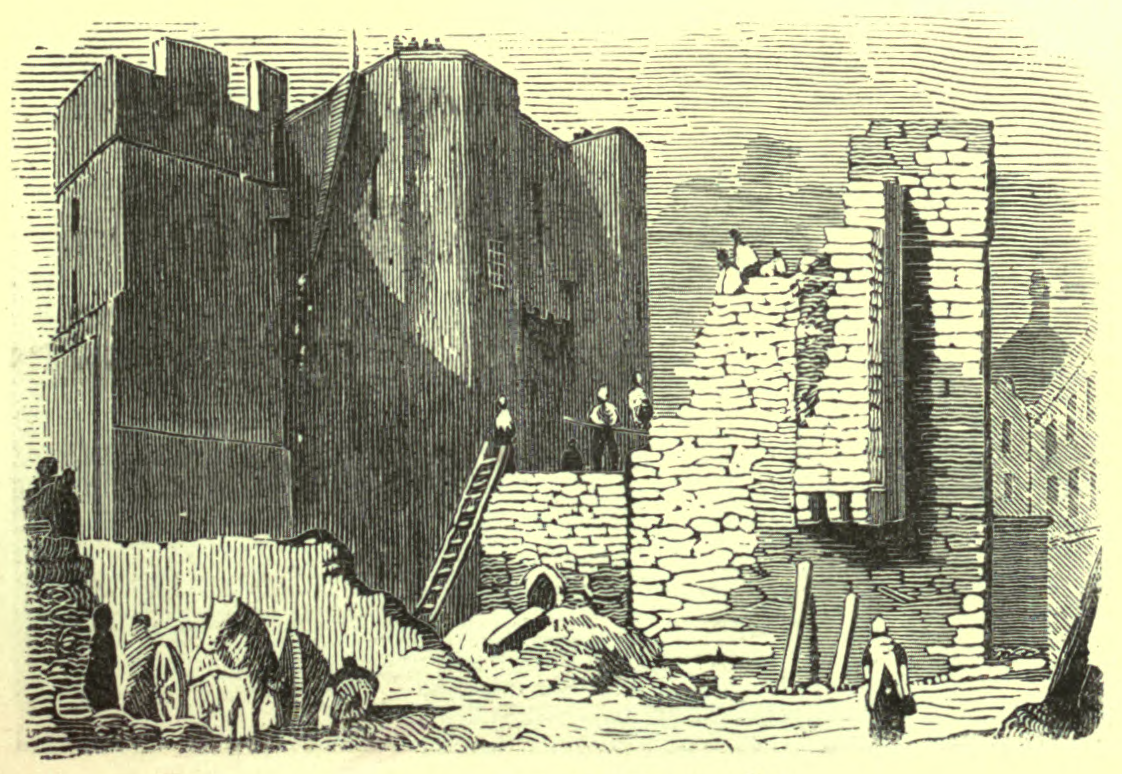
Demolition of the New Gate in 1823

Whilst the work was going on, a jeu d'esprit was privately circulated, which attracted some notice.

Alack! and well-a-day!
Mr. Mayor, Mr. Mayor,
We are all to grief a prey,
Mr. Mayor, Mr. Mayor,
They are pulling Newgate down,
That structure of renown,
Which so long has graced the town,
Mr. Mayor, Mr. Mayor.

Antiquarians think't a scandal,
Mr. Mayor, Mr. Mayor,
It would shock a Goth or Vandal,
They declare;
What, destroy the finest Lion
That ever man set eye on!
'Tis a deed all must cry fie on,
Mr. Mayor, Mr. Mayor,

'Tis a pile of ancient standing,
Mr. Mayor, Mr. Mayor,
Deep reverence commanding,
Mr. Mayor, Mr. Mayor,
Men of note and estimation,
In their course of elevation
Have in it held a station.
Mr. Mayor, Mr. Mayor.

Still, if Newgate's doomed to go,
Mr. Mayor, Mr. Mayor,
To the Carliol Croft heigh ho !
Mr. Mayor, Mr. Mayor,
As sure as you're alive,
(And long, sir, may you thrive),
This shock we'll ne'er survive,
Mr. Mayor, Mr. Mayor.

Then pity our condition,
Mr. Mayor, Mr. Mayor,
And stop its demolition,
Mr. Mayor, Mr. Mayor;
The commissioners restrain
From causing us such pain.
And we'll pay, and ne'er complain,
The gaol-cess, Mr. Mayor.
