= Ma On Kong =

Village in Pat Heung, Hong Kong

Coordinates: 22.415762°N 114.066359°E

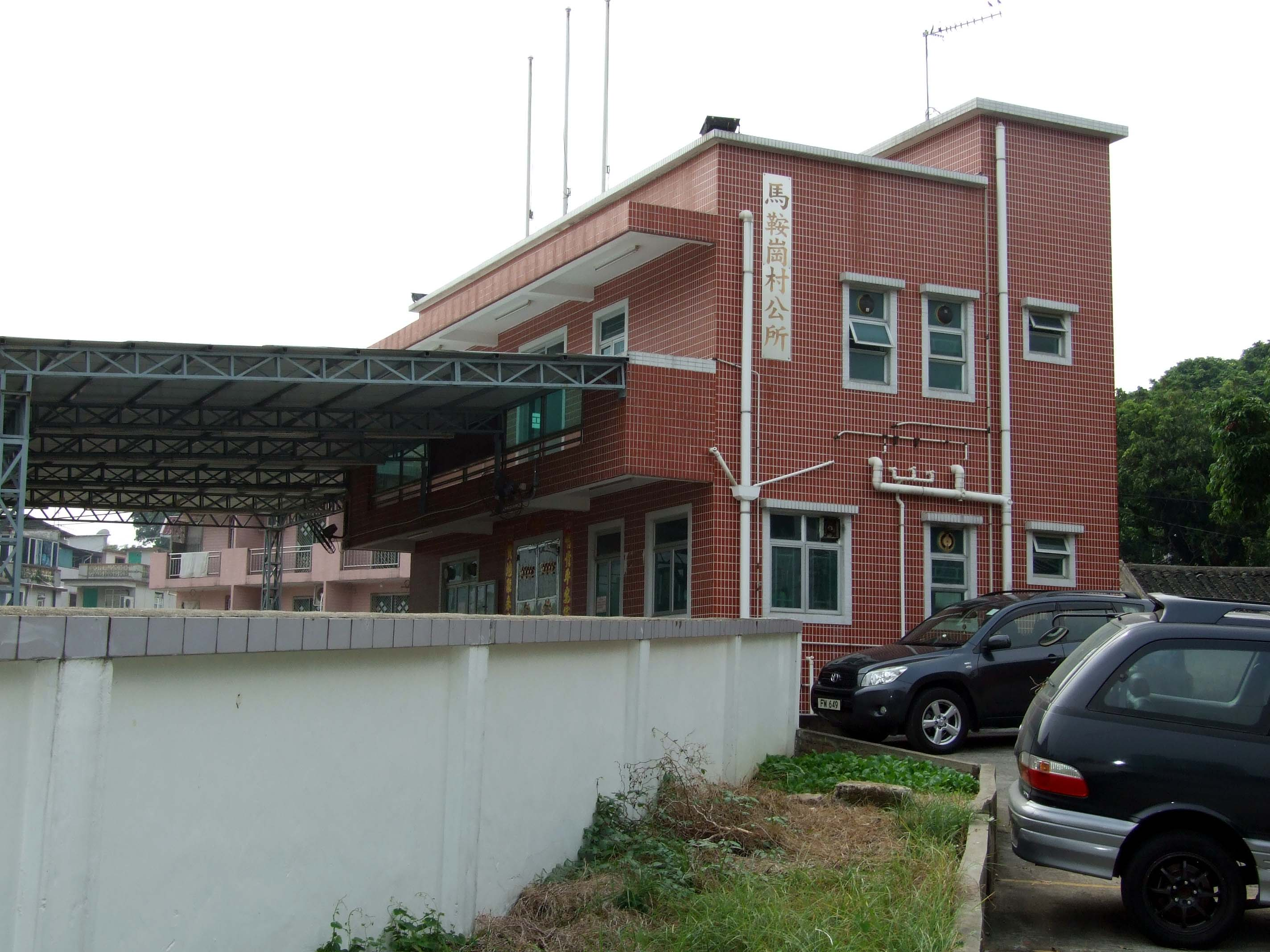
Ma On Kong village office.

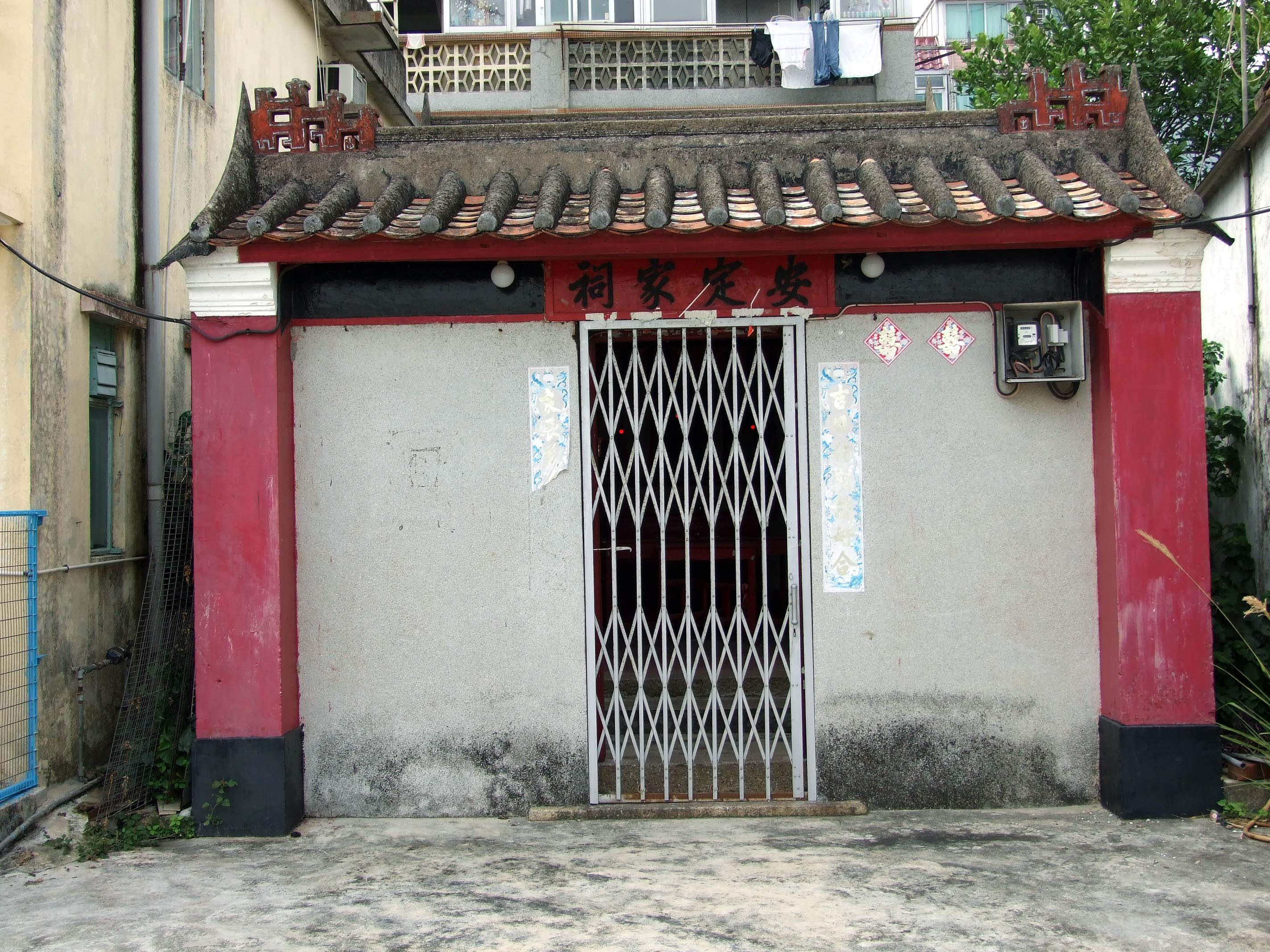
On Ding Ancestral Hall in Ma On Kong.

Ma On Kong (Chinese: 馬鞍崗) is a village in Pat Heung, Yuen Long District, Hong Kong.

== Administration ==
Ma On Kong is a recognized village under the New Territories Small House Policy. It is one of the villages represented within the Pat Heung Rural Committee. For electoral purposes, Ma On Kong is part of the Pat Heung South constituency, which is currently represented by Lai Wing-tim.

== See also ==
- Tai Lam Tunnel
- Ho Pui and Tai Kek, two nearby villages
