= Edward Nicholls (captain) =

English sea captain

- Occupation: Sea captain

Edward Nicholls (fl. 1617) was an English sea captain.

== Biography ==
Nicholls in 1616 commanded the Dolphin of London, of about 220 tons, trading to the Levant. She had 19 guns, mostly small, 5 murderers or swivels, and a crew, all told, of 38 men and boys. On 1 January 1616–17 she left Zante, homeward bound, with a full cargo, and on the 12th, being then off the south end of Sardinia, she fell in with a squadron of five Turkish men-of-war, probably of Algiers, all large ships, heavily armed and full of men, and three of them commanded by Englishmen, whose names are given as Walsingham, Kelly, and Sampson. The fight that followed between these pirates and the Dolphin was one of the most remarkable that have been recorded. Over and over again the Turks attempted to board the Dolphin; two or three times they even succeeded in doing so: but the heavy fire kept up from the Dolphin's round-house and close fights forced the enemy to retire with great loss. The Turkish ships were raked through and through, and towards night they drew off, in evident distress, and having lost, it was supposed, a great many men. The Dolphin, too, had suffered a good deal of damage, with seven killed and nine wounded. The next day she put in to Cagliari, where she refitted and buried her dead. On 20 February she sailed for England, and arrived in the Thames without further hindrance. Of Nicholls nothing more seems to be known.
