= Tai Kek =

Village in Hong Kong

Coordinates: 22.416562°N 114.069107°E

Tai Kek (Chinese: 大乪) is a village in Pat Heung, Yuen Long District, Hong Kong.

== Administration ==
Tai Kek is a recognized village under the New Territories Small House Policy.

== See also ==
- Ho Pui and Ma On Kong, two nearby villages
