= Ho Pui (Yuen Long District) =

Coordinates: 22.413288°N 114.067347°E

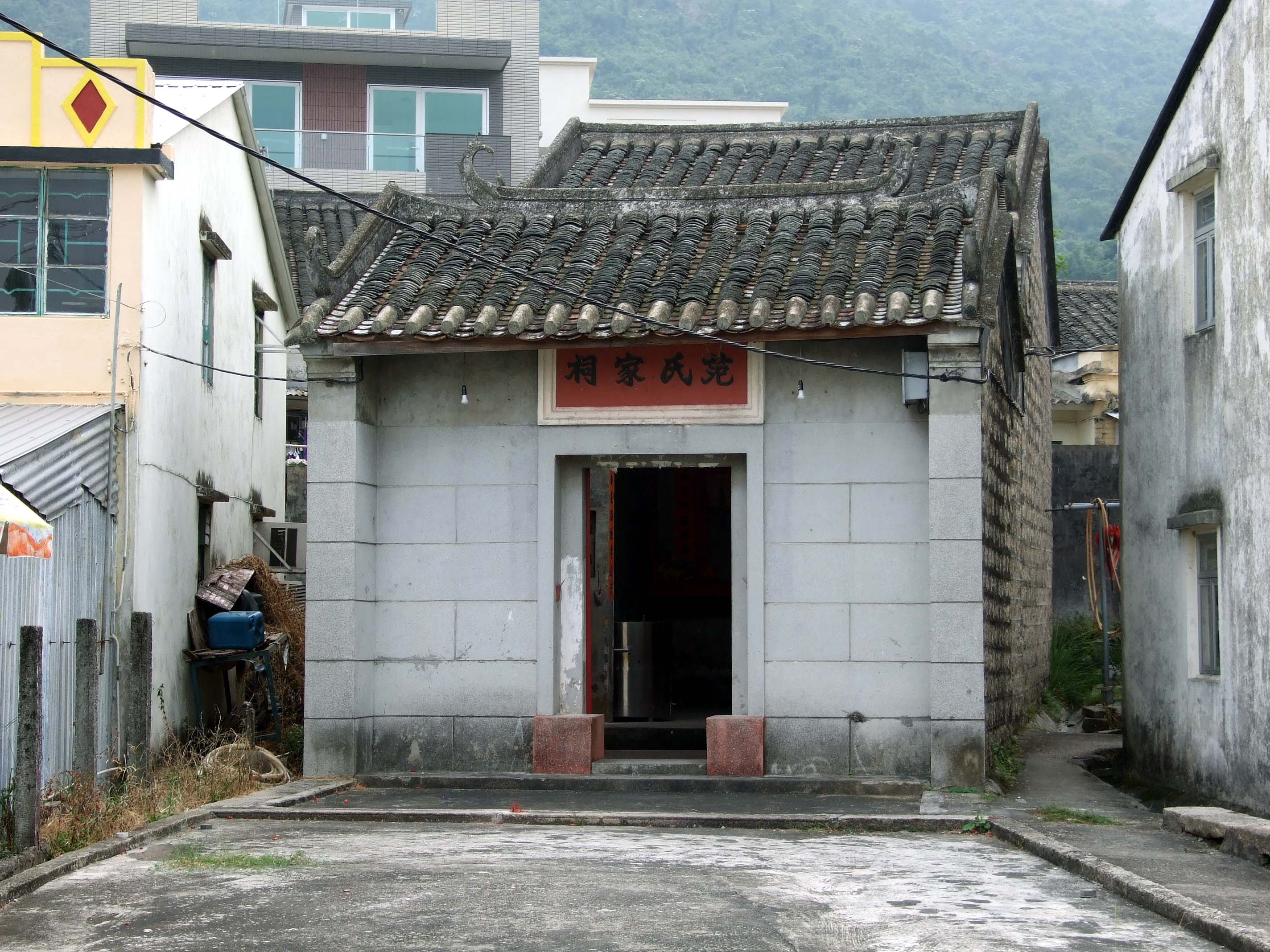
Fan Ancestral Hall in Ho Pui.

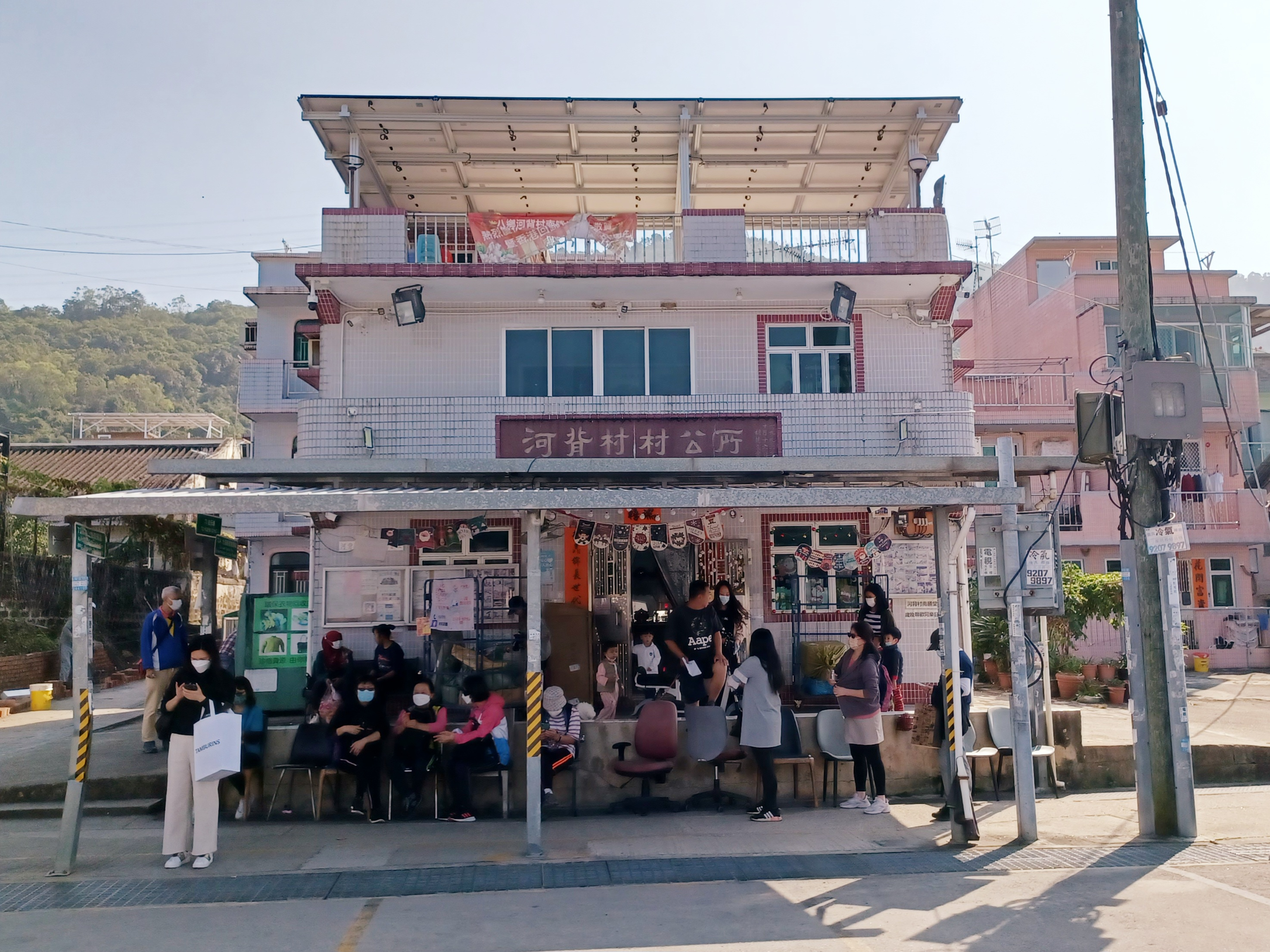
Ho Pui Tsuen Village Office.

Ho Pui (Chinese: 河背) is a village in Pat Heung, Yuen Long District, Hong Kong.

== Administration ==
Ho Pui is a recognized village under the New Territories Small House Policy.

== See also ==
- Ho Pui Reservoir
- Ma On Kong and Tai Kek, two nearby villages
