= Ho Pui Reservoir =

Irrigation reservoir in Hong Kong

- 河背水塘 (Chinese)
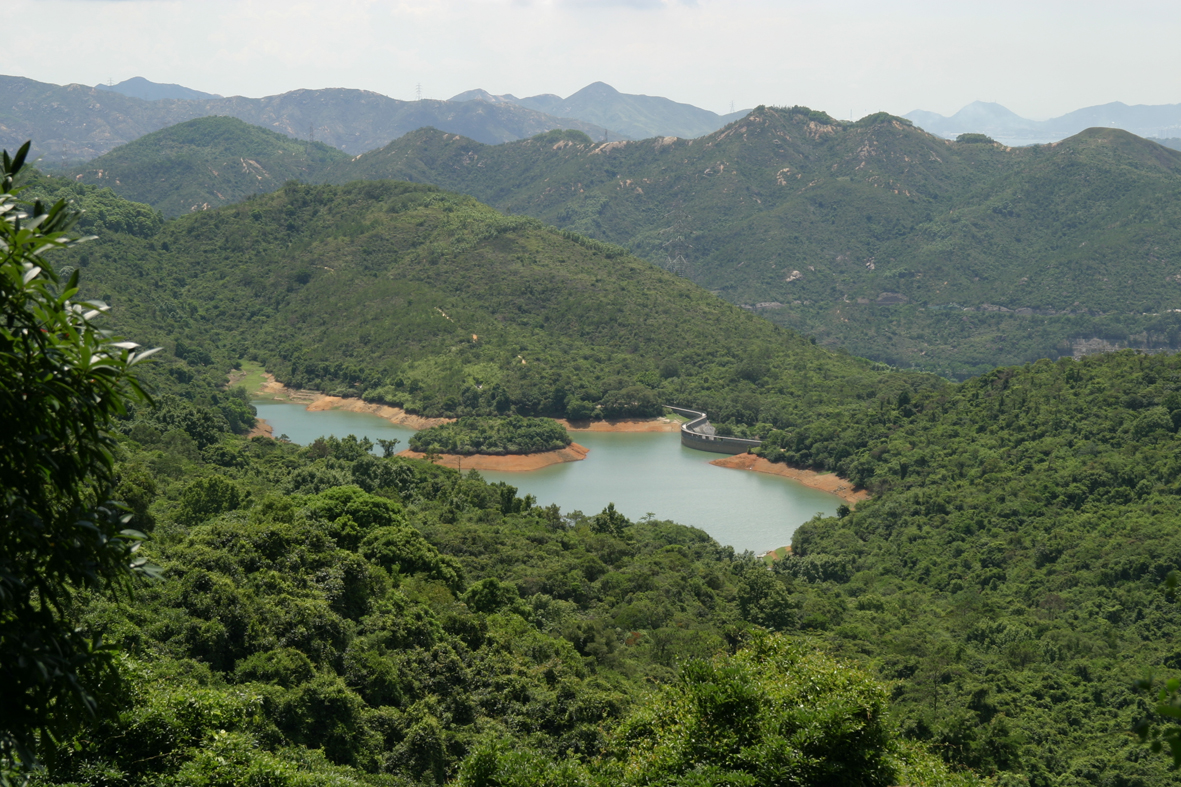
- Ho Pui Reservoir

- Location within Hong Kong Location within China
- Interactive map of Ho Pui Reservoir
- Location: Tai Lam, Hong Kong
- Coordinates: 22.40631°N 114.07495°E
- Type: Reservoir
- Basin countries: China
- Managing agency: Water Supplies Department
- First flooded: 1962
- Water volume: 450 million litres (99,000,000 imp gal; 120,000,000 US gal)

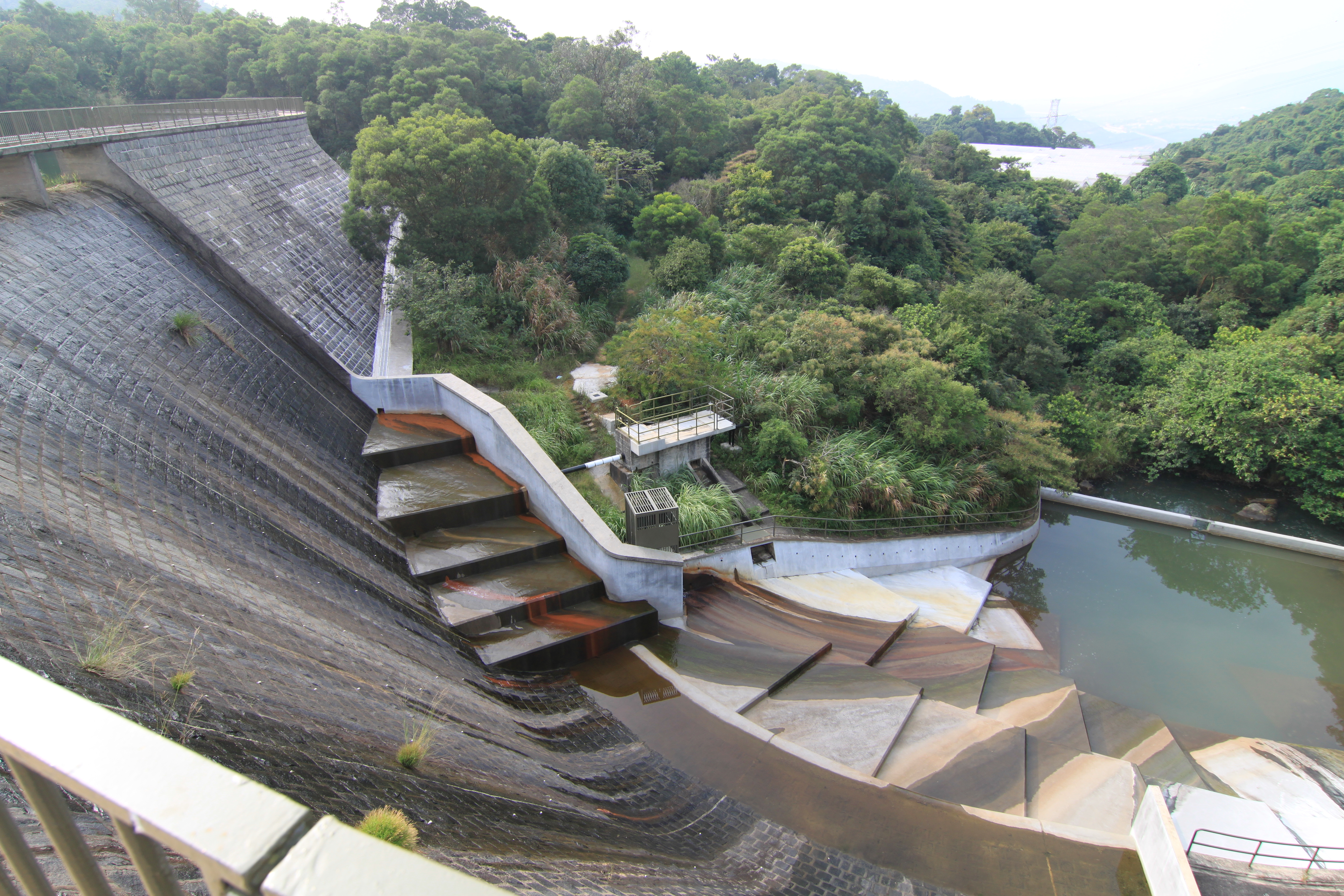
Ho Pui Dam.

Ho Pui Reservoir (Chinese: 河背水塘) is an irrigation reservoir in Hong Kong, managed by Water Supplies Department.

The water of the Ho Pui Reservoir is used for irrigating agricultural lands in the northwest New Territories.

The Ho Pui Reservoir Family Walk has been noted for its beautiful bamboo grove.

== See also ==
- List of reservoirs of Hong Kong
- Ho Pui (Yuen Long District)
