= Matthias Hawdon =

English composer and organist

Matthias Hawdon (1732–1789) was an English composer and organist based in the East Riding of Yorkshire and Newcastle upon Tyne.

== Life ==
He was the son of Thomas Hawdon, and christened on 24 October 1732 in All Saints' Church, Newcastle upon Tyne. He studied organ under Charles Avison.

He married Mary Browne on 6 March 1760 in Holy Trinity Church, Hull.

His son, Thomas Hawdon, was also an organist, and followed in his footsteps as organist of Holy Trinity Church, Hull in 1787.

In 1776 he returned to Newcastle after the death of Edward Avison (son of his teacher, Charles Avison) from whom he took over the promotion of a concert subscription series in the city, but this bankrupted him in 1781. He was also organist of St. Nicholas' Church, Newcastle.

== Appointments ==
- Organist at Holy Trinity Church, Hull 1751 – 1769
- Organist at Beverley Minster 1769 – 1776
- Organist at St. Nicholas' Church, Newcastle 1776 – 1789

== Compositions ==
He wrote:

- A new song 1755
- Beauty's power 1765
- Innocence and love 1770
- Six conversion sonatas for the harpsichord or pianoforte, with accompaniments for two violins and violoncello, opera second 1775
- Fancy sung by Mr. Morgan 1780
- Two concertos: for the organ or harpsichord with instrumental parts. 1780
- Six Sonatas Spirituale or Voluntaries – Opus 4, 1784
