= Thomas Hawdon =

Thomas Hawdon (ca.1765 – 24 November 1793) was an organist, instrumentalist, impresario and teacher based in the East Riding of Yorkshire and Newcastle-upon-Tyne.

== Life ==
He was the son of organist Matthias Hawdon. He married Sarah Webster in May 1789 in Hull (she died March 1790), and they had one daughter, Sarah Hawdon (b. March 1790).

In 1790 in conjunction with Charles Avison, he promoted a series of concerts in Newcastle-upon-Tyne.

== Appointments ==
- Organist at St Andrew's Church, Newcastle upon Tyne 1783
- Organist in Dundee 1783 - 1787
- Organist at Holy Trinity Church, Hull 1787 - 1789
- Organist of All Saints' Church, Newcastle upon Tyne 1789 - 1793
