= Hull Minster =

Anglican minster church in Kingston upon Hull, East Riding of Yorkshire, England

Coordinates: 53°44′29″N 0°20′00″W

- Holy Trinity Church
- Hull Minster
- Hull Minster
- OS grid reference: TA 09963 28554
- Country: England
- Denomination: Church of England
- Previous denomination: Roman Catholic Church
- Website: HullMinster.org

History
- Status: Minster
- Dedication: Holy Trinity

Architecture
- Style: Perpendicular Gothic
- Years built: c. 1285 transepts 1300–20 choir 1340–70 nave 1380–1420 tower 1490–1520

Specifications
- Length: 285 feet (87 m)

Administration
- Province: Province of York
- Diocese: Diocese of York
- Archdeaconry: East Riding
- Deanery: Kingston upon Hull
- Benefice: Kingston upon Hull Holy Trinity
- Parish: The Most Holy and Undivided Trinity Kingston upon Hull

Clergy
- Vicar: Revd Canon Dr Dominic Black

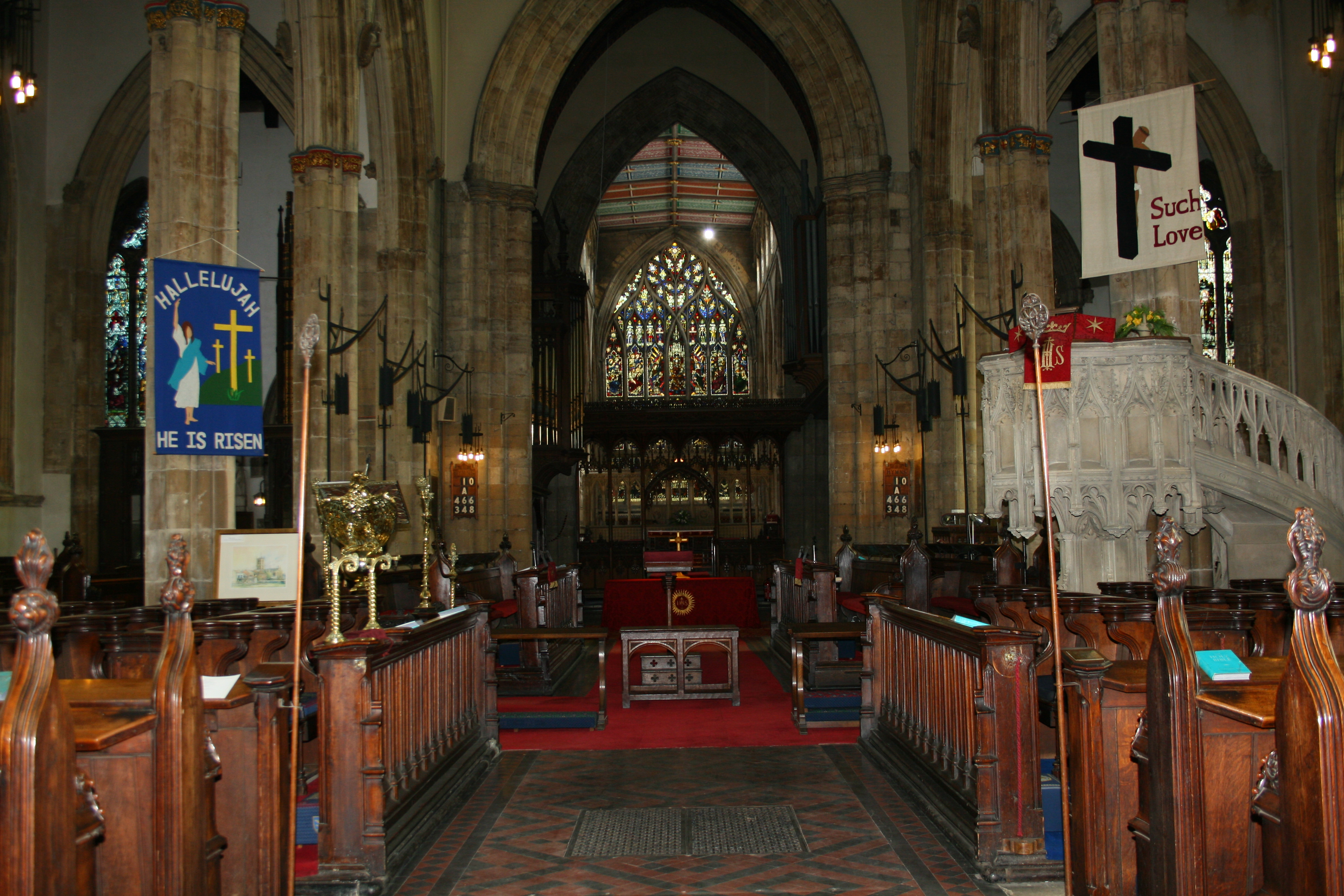
The altar

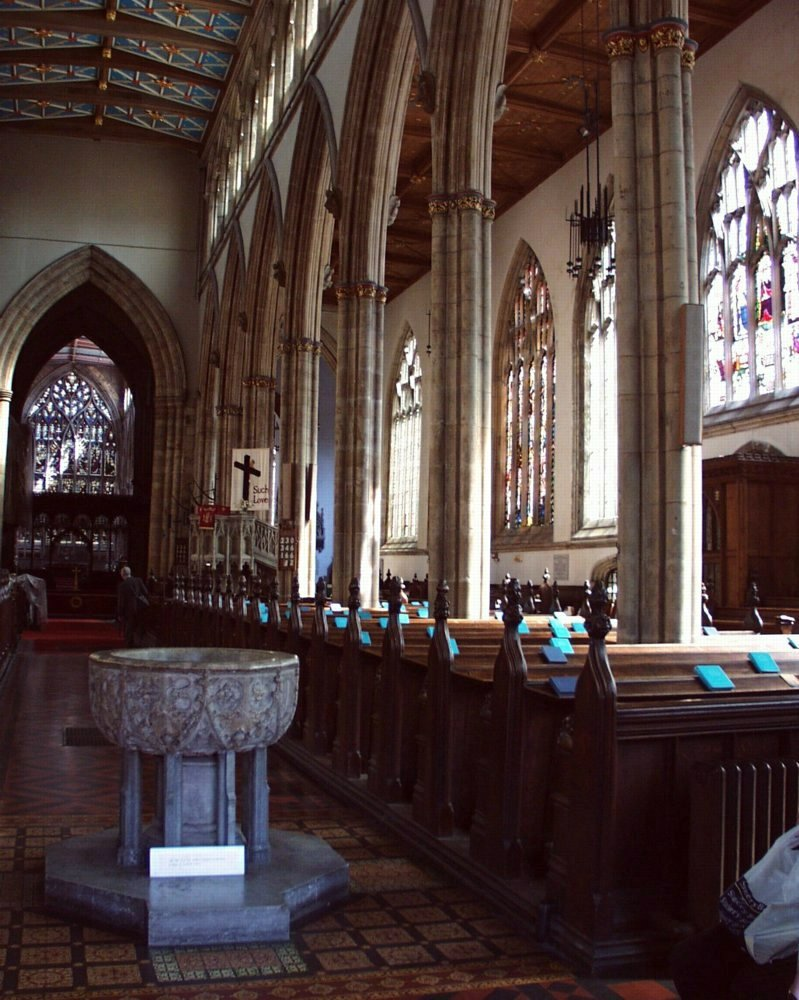
The font and south aisle

Hull Minster is the Anglican minster and the parish church of Kingston upon Hull in the East Riding of Yorkshire, England. The church was called Holy Trinity Church until 13 May 2017, when it was renamed Hull Minster.

== History ==
Trinity Church Hull Act 1661
- Act of Parliament
- Parliament of England
- Long title: An Act for dividing Trynity Church, in Kingston upon Hull, from Hassle.
- Citation: 13 Cha. 2. St. 2. c. 2 Pr.
- Territorial extent: England and Wales

Dates
- Royal assent: 20 December 1661

Status: Current legislation

The transepts date from c. 1300–20, the choir is estimated at 1340–70, the nave 1380–1420 and the tower 1490–1520. In the early to mid 18th century, the brickwork of the choir and transepts was covered with stucco, later removed in a restoration of the church by Henry Francis Lockwood between 1842 and 1845. During this restoration the galleries and pews were removed. The stonework was cleaned of paint. The nave was fitted with oak stalls enriched with poppy heads, carved by George Peck of Hull. Many of the poppy heads were executed from casts of existing models in Lincoln Cathedral. Central heating consisting of iron pipework was installed in the nave by Mr. Reid of Hull. The ceiling was decorated mainly in ultra-marine blue, with beams picked out in Crimson and gold.

William Wilberforce, who led the parliamentary campaign against the slave trade, was baptised in Holy Trinity Church in 1759.

In 1861 a lengthy restoration of the church was begun under the direction of the architect Sir George Gilbert Scott which lasted until 1878 and cost £32,750 (equivalent to £3,370,400 in 2025).

In 1906 it was discovered that the tower was in danger, resulting in emergency work to underpin the church with concrete and rebuild the nave piers. This was done under the direction of the architect Frederick Stead Brodrick.

The Church was lucky to escape serious damage from the very heavy bombing that Hull endured in both world wars. Hull was an easy target for the Luftwaffe to find on account of its proximity to the Humber Estuary and the North Sea.

In November 2014 plans were unveiled to reorder the church, creating an outstanding venue for performances, exhibitions and banquets, a visitor destination, and a place where those in need of help can find assistance. The aim was to create a place for the whole community, and a venue that would be a driving force in the regeneration of Hull's Old Town. The transformation, costing a total of £4.5 million, was to take place in phases from 2016 onwards, the first being ready for Hull's role as UK City of Culture in 2017.

On 7 November 2016 the then Archbishop of York, John Sentamu, announced that the church would be given Minster status in a ceremony on 13 May 2017. Sentamu came to Hull on 13 May in a flotilla of boats with a lantern lit at All Saints' Church, Hessle, to rededicate the church as Hull Minster.

In March 2019 the Minster received a grant of £3.9 million from Highways England to create a visitor centre, café and exhibition spaces.

== Current status ==
Hull Minster is the largest parish church in England by floor area, and contains what is widely acknowledged to be some of the finest medieval brick-work in the country, particularly in the transepts. The Minster Church is a Grade I listed building. As of March 2026 the church is staffed by two ordained ministers and a wider support and administrative team.

The Minster Church is a member of the Greater Churches Group.

== Tower ==
=== Clock ===
Two of the large clock-faces on the tower

The clock in the tower was originally built by Joseph Hindley of York in 1772 with one face.

The single dial of the clock was replaced in 1840 by James Harrison IV who installed a new clock mechanism and four 13.25 feet (4.04 m) dials, which were at this point the largest parish church clock dials in England. The minute hand was 9.33 feet (2.84 m) long, and the hour hand 8.33 feet (2.54 m).

This clock mechanism was replaced in July 1913 by Potts of Leeds. It contains a Cambridge quarter-chiming clock. The dials by James Harrison of 1840 were retained.

=== Chimes ===
The first chime was installed in 1777. The chime mechanism was constructed by Mr. E. Todd of Mytongate, Hull. The barrel tunes were pinned by Joseph Hindley of York who had installed the clock in 1772. It had several tunes and had to be wound twice each day. It was restored in 1828 and 1865 and chimed on eight bells until 1898 when the bells were removed and recast by John Taylor and Co. of Loughborough.

A new clock was installed in 1913 which chimes (Westminster) and strikes on the bells.

In May 2013 a chime of 15 additional bells was installed which was supplemented in 2014 by 8 further bells and 2017 by 2 further bells to bring the carillon to 25 bells. The carillon is operated by a digital control box but can also be played manually from a MIDI keyboard.

=== Bells ===
In addition to the carillon, the tower contains 15 bells hung for full circle change ringing. A peal of 12 together with 3 incidentals (an extra treble, 2♯ and 6♭). Ten of the bells date from 1899, 2 from 1959, 1 from 1975, 1 from 1979, and 1 from 1983. All were cast by John Taylor of Loughborough.

There is also a 16th Bell named the 'Lady' bell, hung for tolling. Cast in Germany in 1910 for the Lutheran Church in Hull it was transferred to Holy Trinity in 2004.

== List of vicars ==
- 1326 Robert de Marton
- 1345 Peter de Aslaksby
- Peter de Walton
- 1349 Thomas de Baynbriggs
- 1349 Robert de Thornton
- 1362 John de Hurtheworth
- 1364 Richard Lestebury
- John Stayngreve
- 1391 Richard Marke
- 1400 John de Barton
- 1416 Thomas de Esyngwald
- 1420 Thomas Bywell
- 1433 Thomas de Bewyk
- 1444 Thomas Delyngton
- 1455 John Harewode
- 1467 William Meryngton
- 1468 John Yolton
- 1492 Robert Hedlam
- 1503 James Cokerell
- 1519 George Dent
- 1522 Thomas Logan
- 1538 William Peres
- 1557 Thomas Fugall
- 1561 Melchior Smyth
- 1591 Theophilus Smyth
- 1615 Richard Perrott
- 1642 William Styles
- 1689 Robert Banks
- 1715 John Wilkinson
- 1715 Charles Mace
- 1721 William Mason
- 1753 Arthur Robinson
- 1783 Thomas Clarke
- 1797 Joseph Milner
- 1797 John Healey Bromby
- 1867 Richard England Brooke
- 1875 Joseph M'Cormick
- 1894 John William Mills
- 1895 Joshua Hughes-Games
- 1904 Arthur Blackwell Goulburn Lillingston
- 1914 Louis George Buchanan
- 1924 Cecil Francis Ayerst
- 1927 William Seldon Morgan
- 1937 Frederick Boreham
- 1947 Leslie Oldfield Kenyon
- 1956 Reginald Iliff
- 1967 Gerald Bernard Bridgman
- 1988 John Watson Waller
- 2002 James Oliphant Forrester
- 2010 Neal Duncan Barnes
- 2020 Dominic Paul Black

== Organ ==
Letters in the possession of the Corporation of Hull from an Archbishop of York to the Mayor and aldermen of Kingston upon Hull dating from 1622–23 refer to the organs that in former times adorned your church and requests that these may be restored and used and that a builder, one John Roper, be employed for this work.

The first post English Civil War organ is believed to have been the work of "Father" Smith in 1711–12, an organ he built originally in 1704 for St Paul's Cathedral London, but which was subsequently removed from there as being too small. This organ was further enlarged by John Snetzler during the 18th century. Ryley of York produced a new organ in 1788. Forster & Andrews built and enlarged organs between 1845 and 1908, their last organ providing the basis for the present substantially enlarged organ of 4-manuals and 104 speaking stops by the John Compton Organ Company in 1938.

A specification of the organ can be found on the National Pipe Organ Register.

=== Organists ===
- Mr. Baker ???? – 1715
- George Smith 1715–1717
- Musgrave Heighington 1717–1720 (later organist of St Nicholas Church, Great Yarmouth)
- William Avison 1720–1751
- Matthias Hawdon 1751–1769 (later organist of Beverley Minster)
- John Hudson 1768–1787
- Thomas Hawdon 1787–1789
- George Lambert 1789–1838
- George James Skelton 1838–1851 – 1868
- Thomas Craddock 1868–1875
- G. E. Jackman 1875–1881
- Fred K. Bentley 1881 – 1921 – 1929
- Norman Ewart Strafford 1929–1951
- Peter Goodman 1951–1961 (previously organist of Guildford Cathedral)
- Ronald Arthur Styles 1961–1977
- Desmond Swinburn 1977–1986
- Julian Savory 1986–1991
- John Pemberton 1991
- Alan Dance, 1991–1999
- Roland Dee 1999–2004
- Paul Derrett and Serena Derrett 2005 – 2007
- Serena Derrett – Director of Music 2007 – 2015 (now known as Jerome Robertson)
- Mark Keith – Organist 2007 –

Organ Scholars

- David Thomas, 2011–2014
- Richard Harrison Cowley, 2017–2021
- Niamh Drew, 2021–2023

== Gallery ==
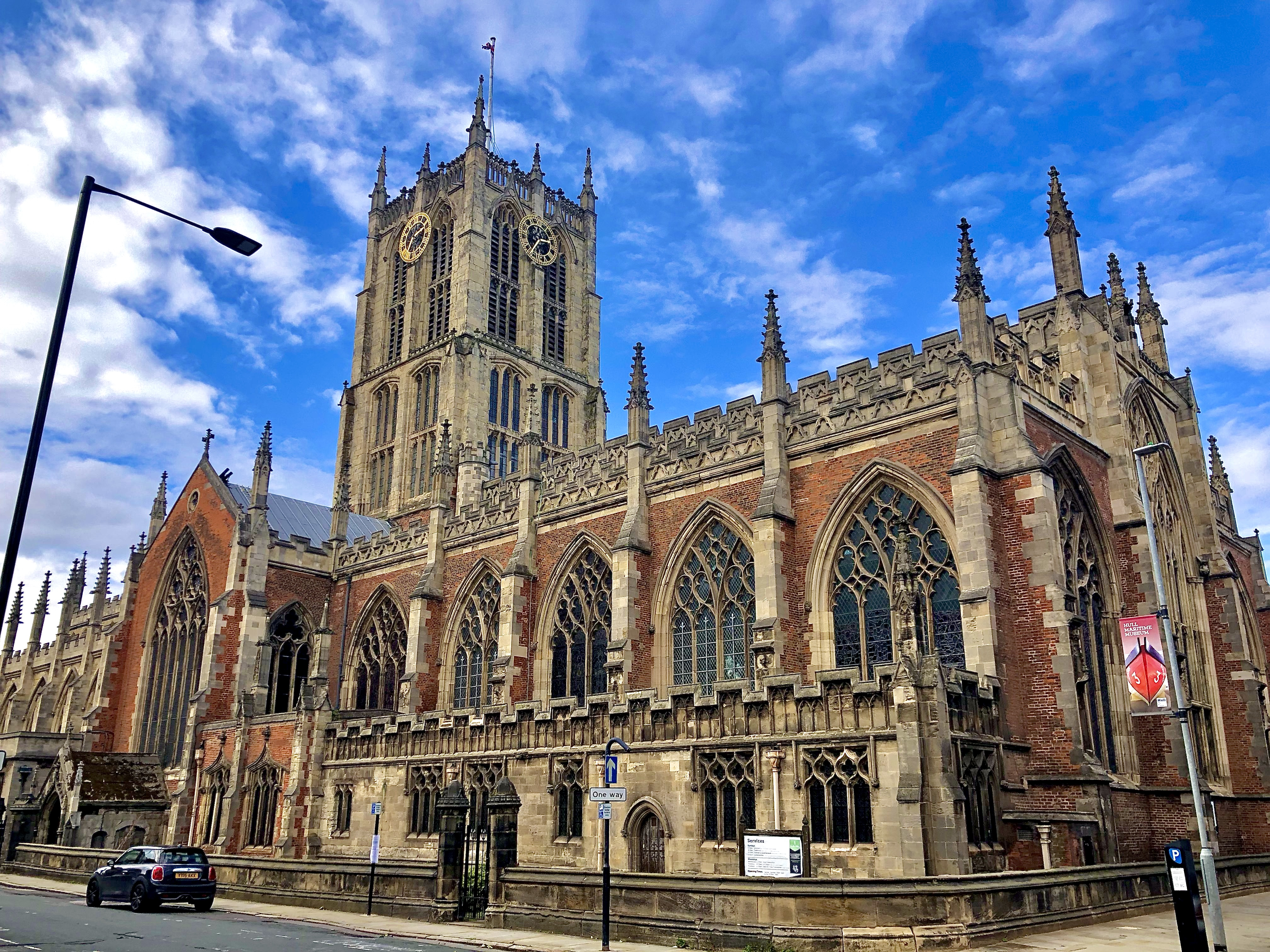
South view

Pediment of the West front

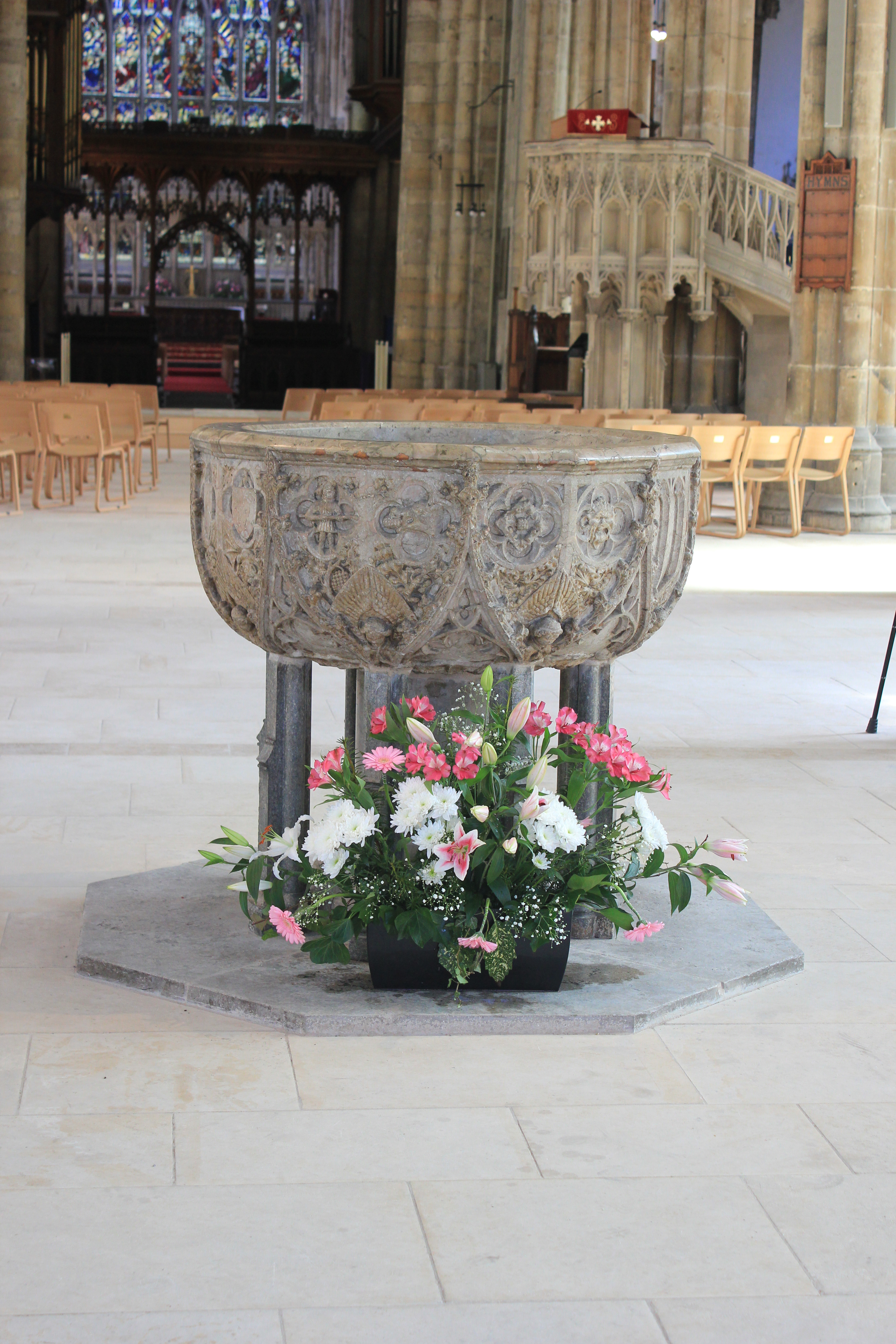
Hull Minster Inside Font

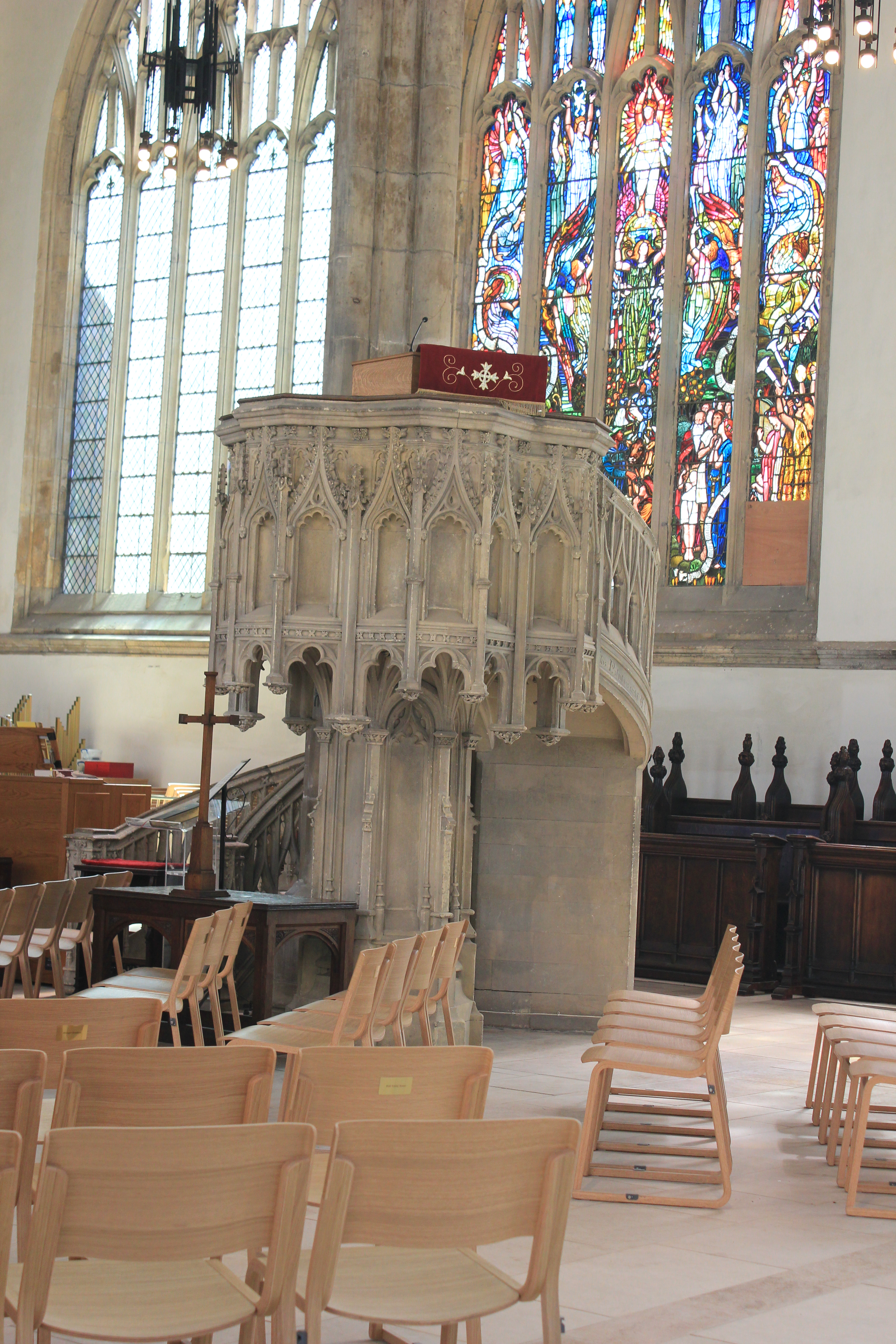
Hull Minster Inside

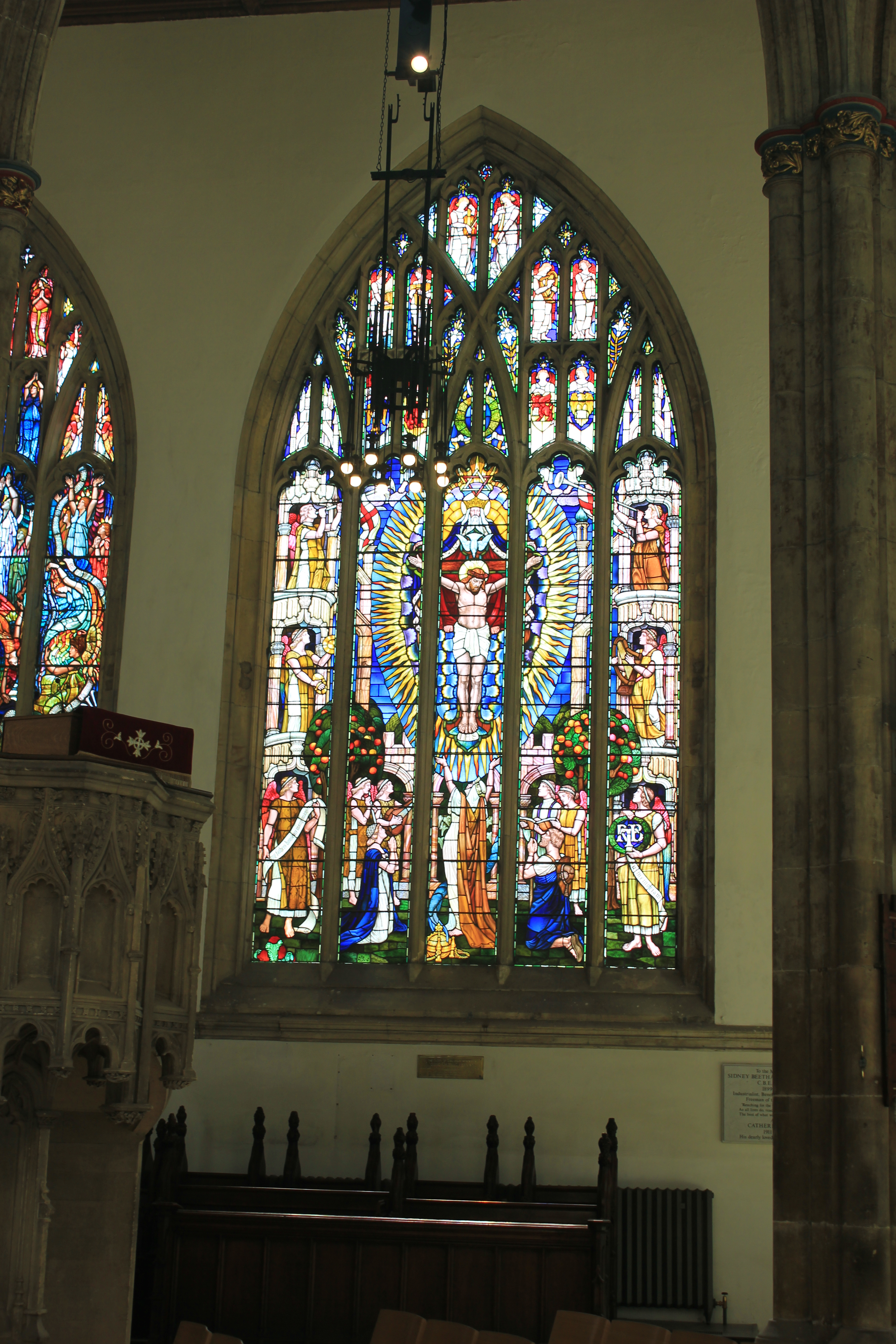
Hull Minster Inside

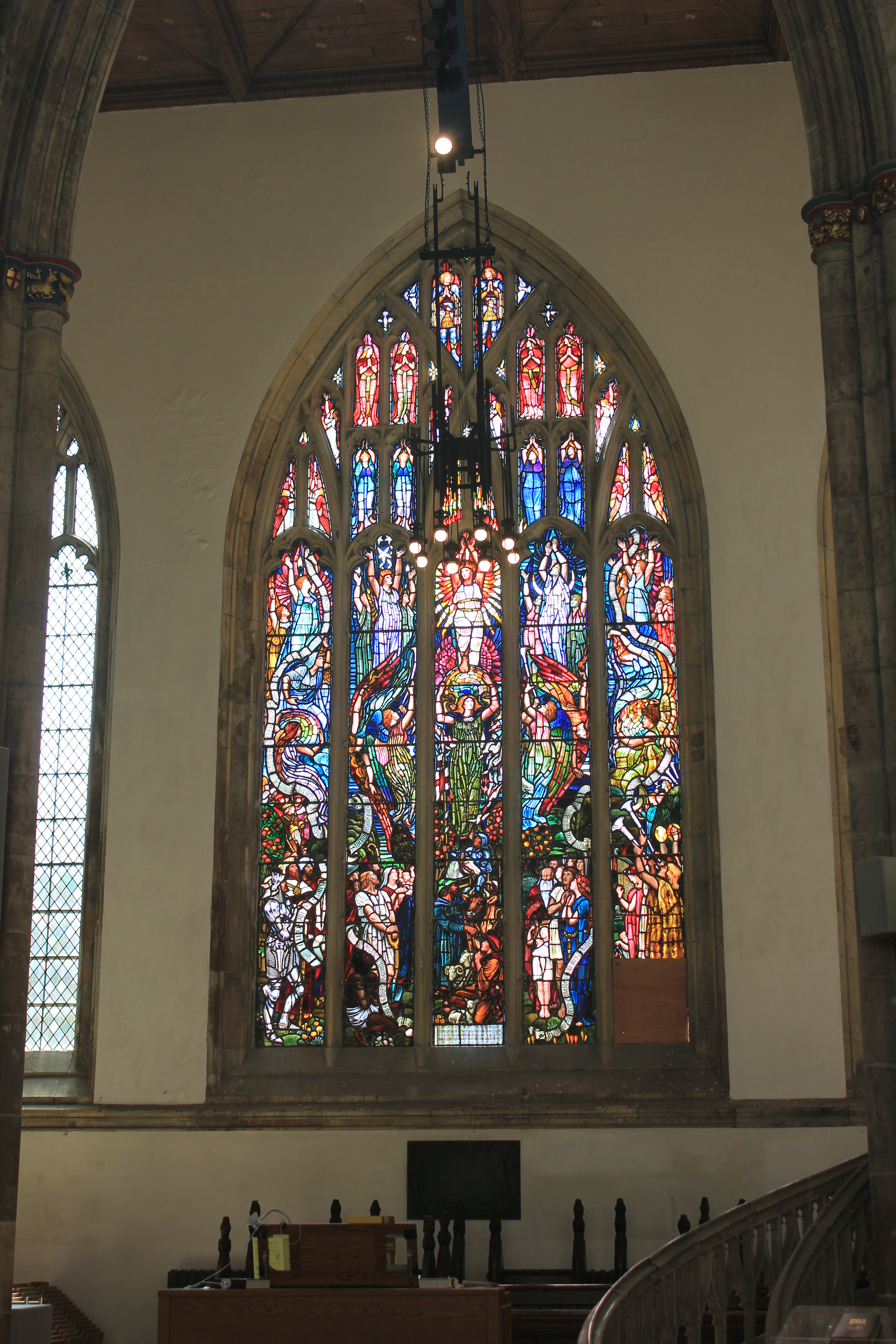
Hull Minster Inside

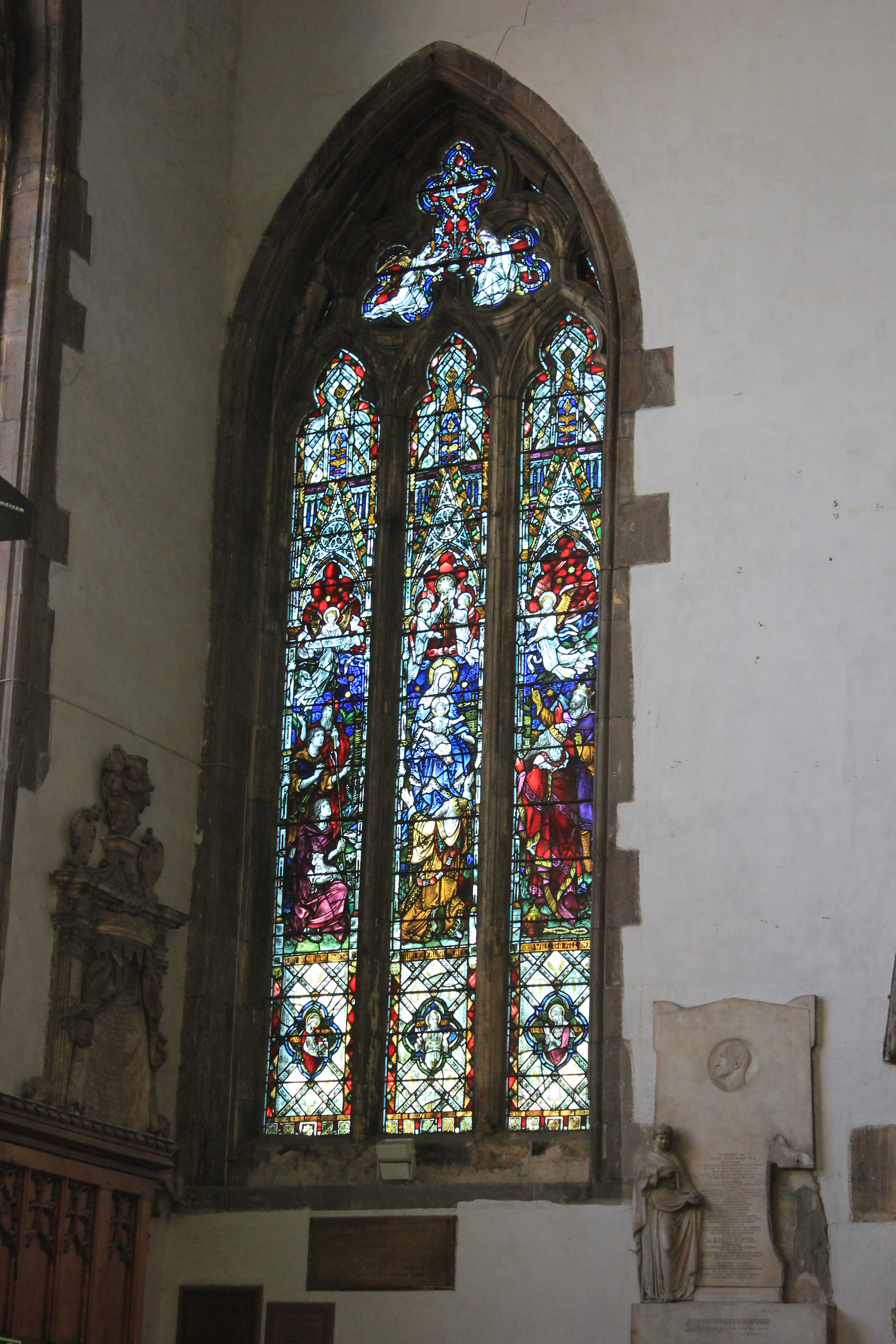
Hull Minster Inside

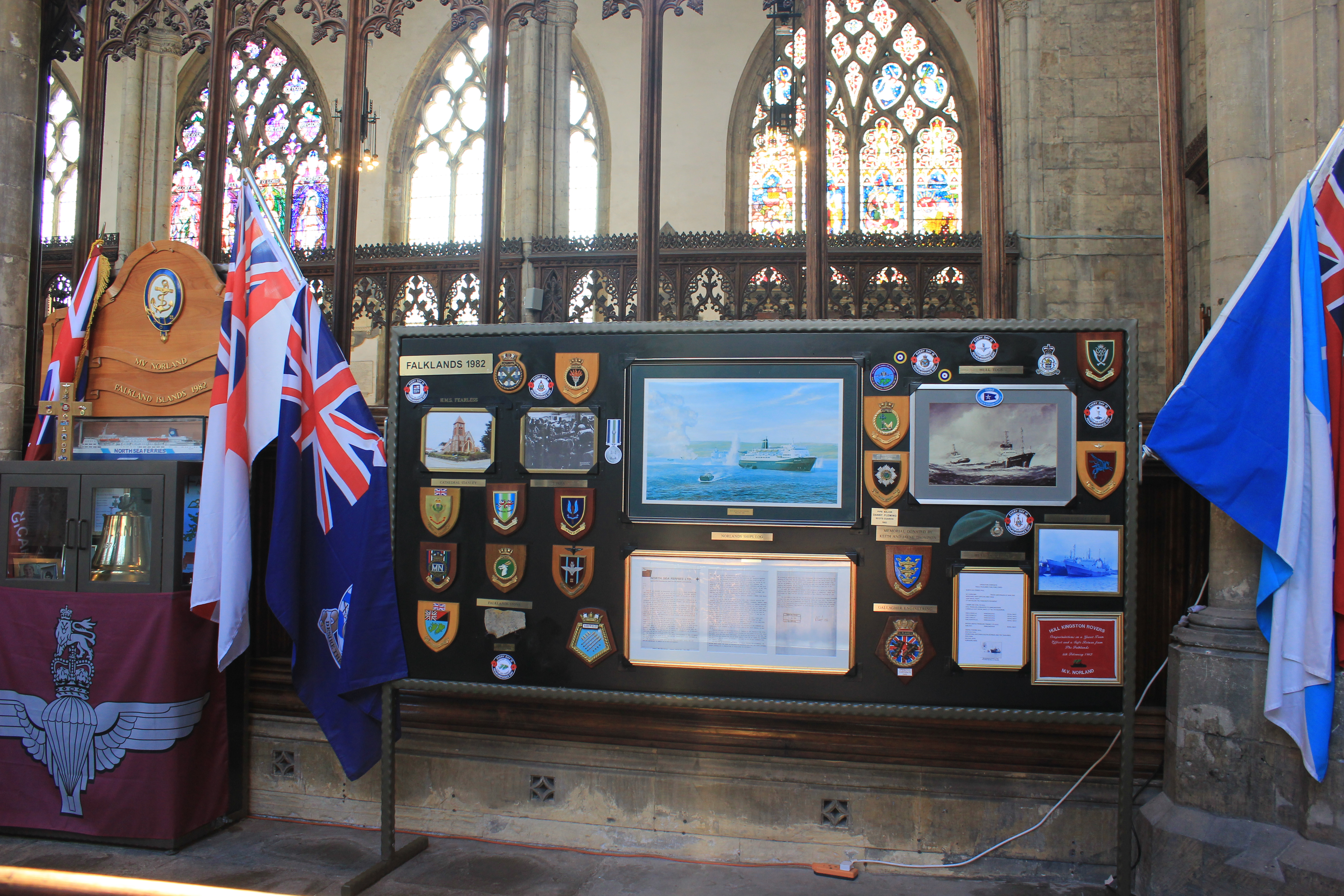
Hull Minster Inside

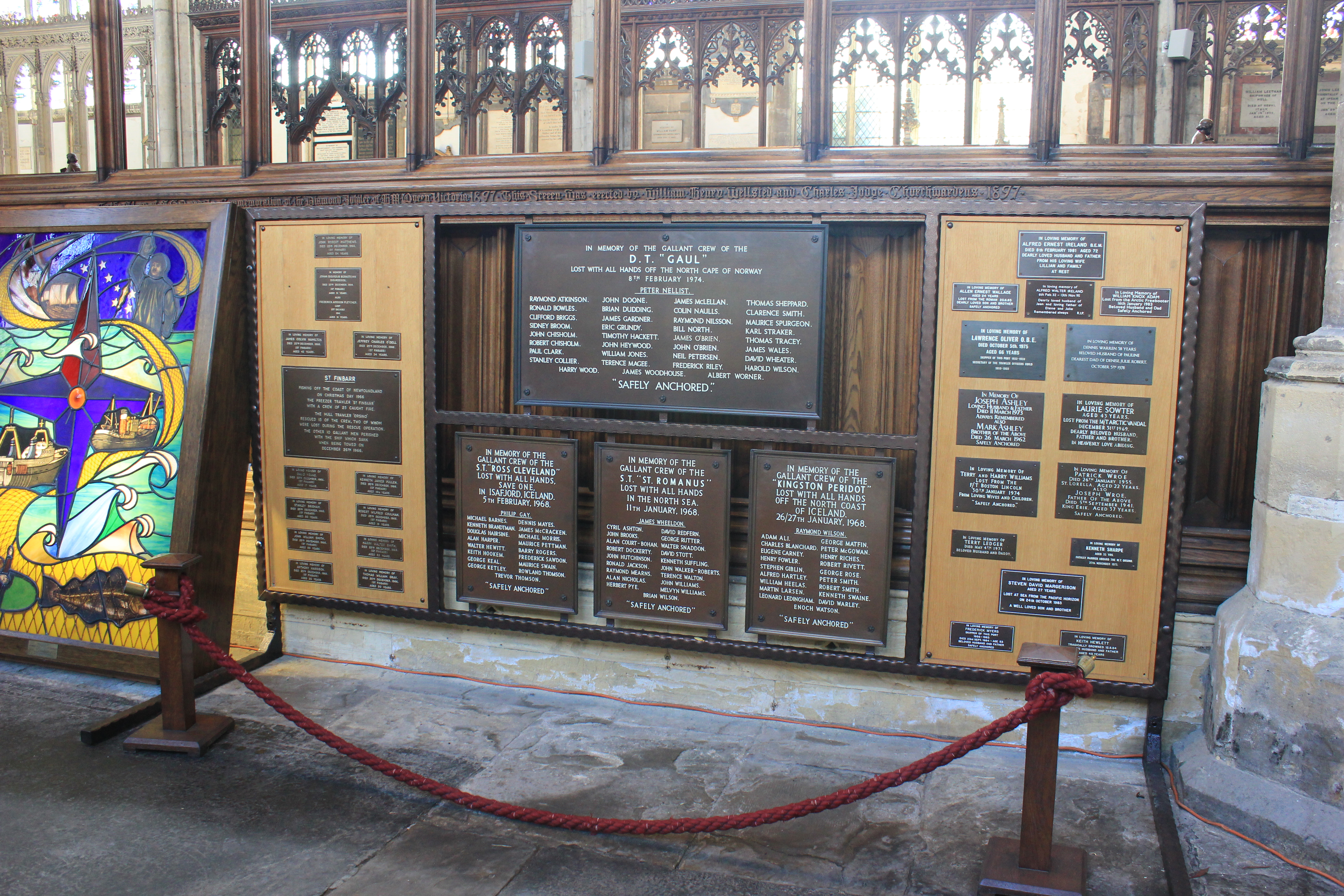
Hull Minster Inside

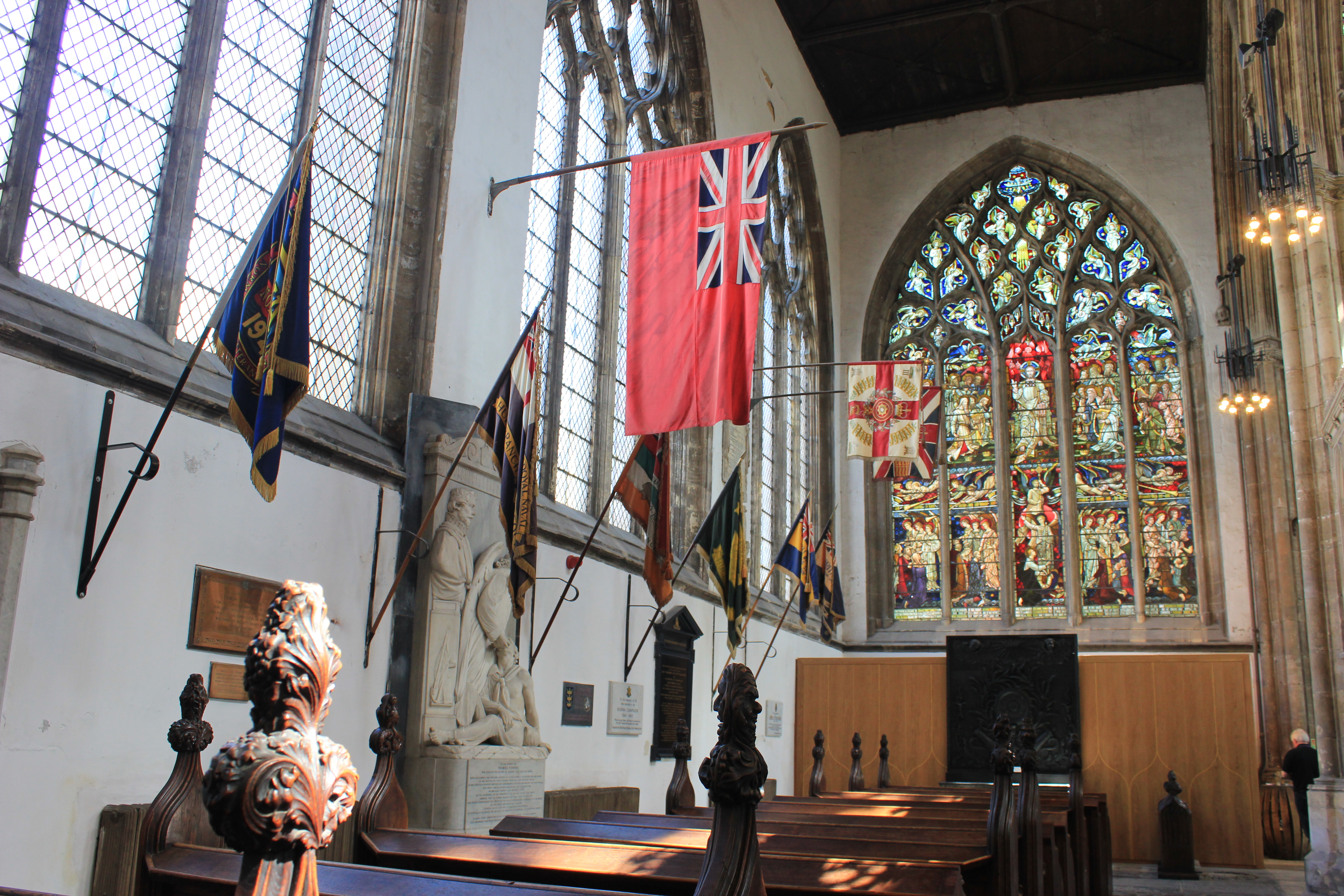
Hull Minster Inside

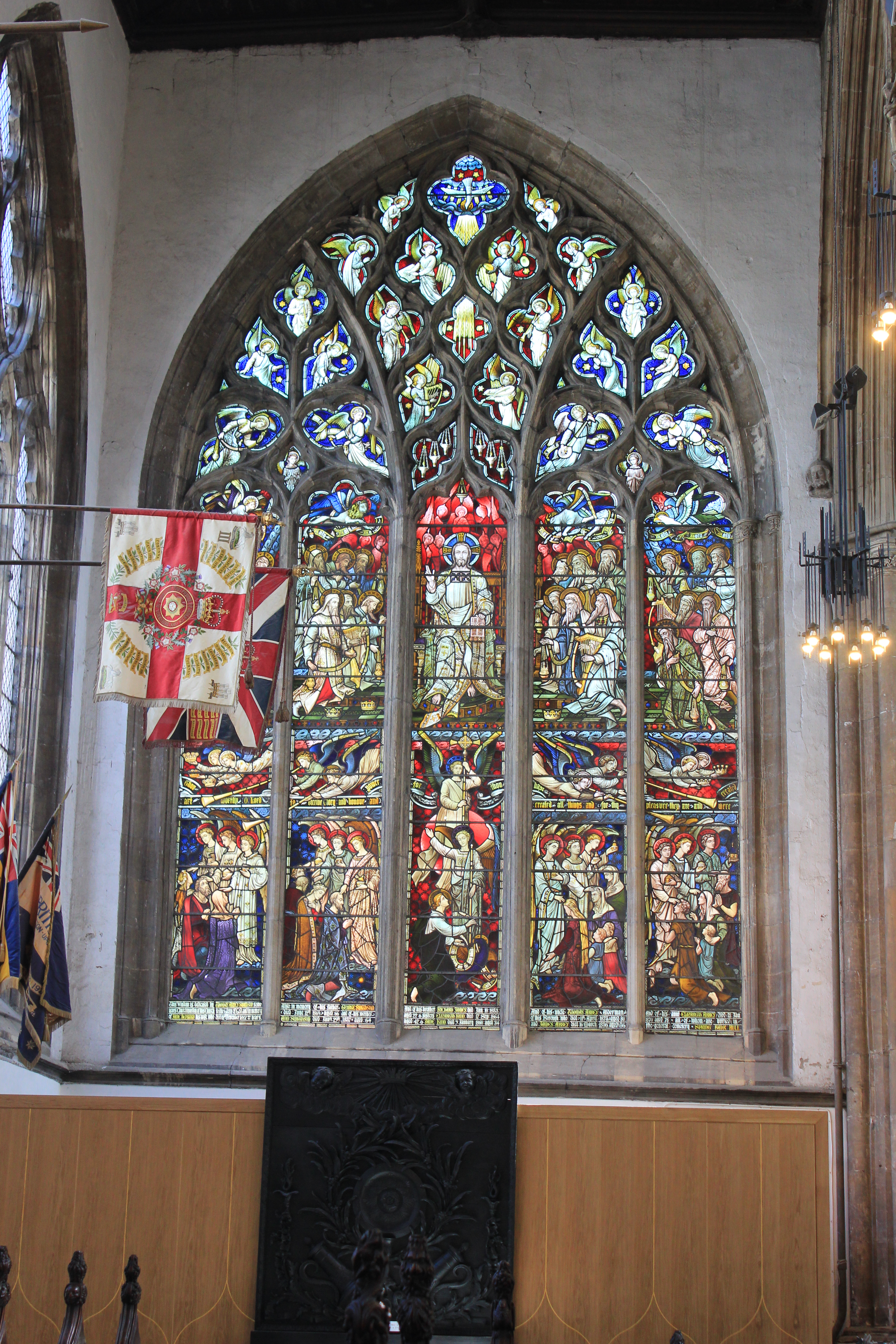
Hull Minster Inside

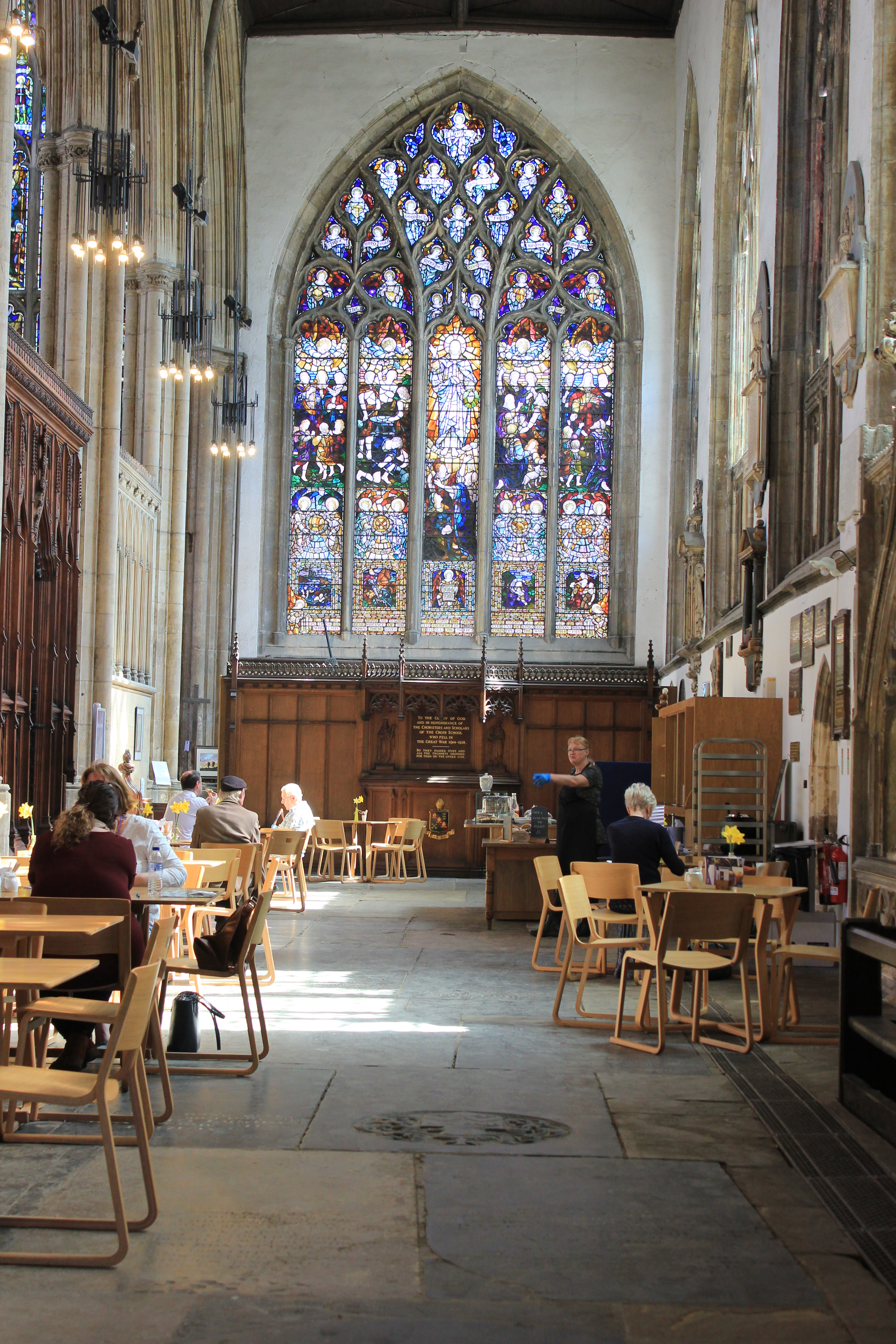
Hull Minster Inside

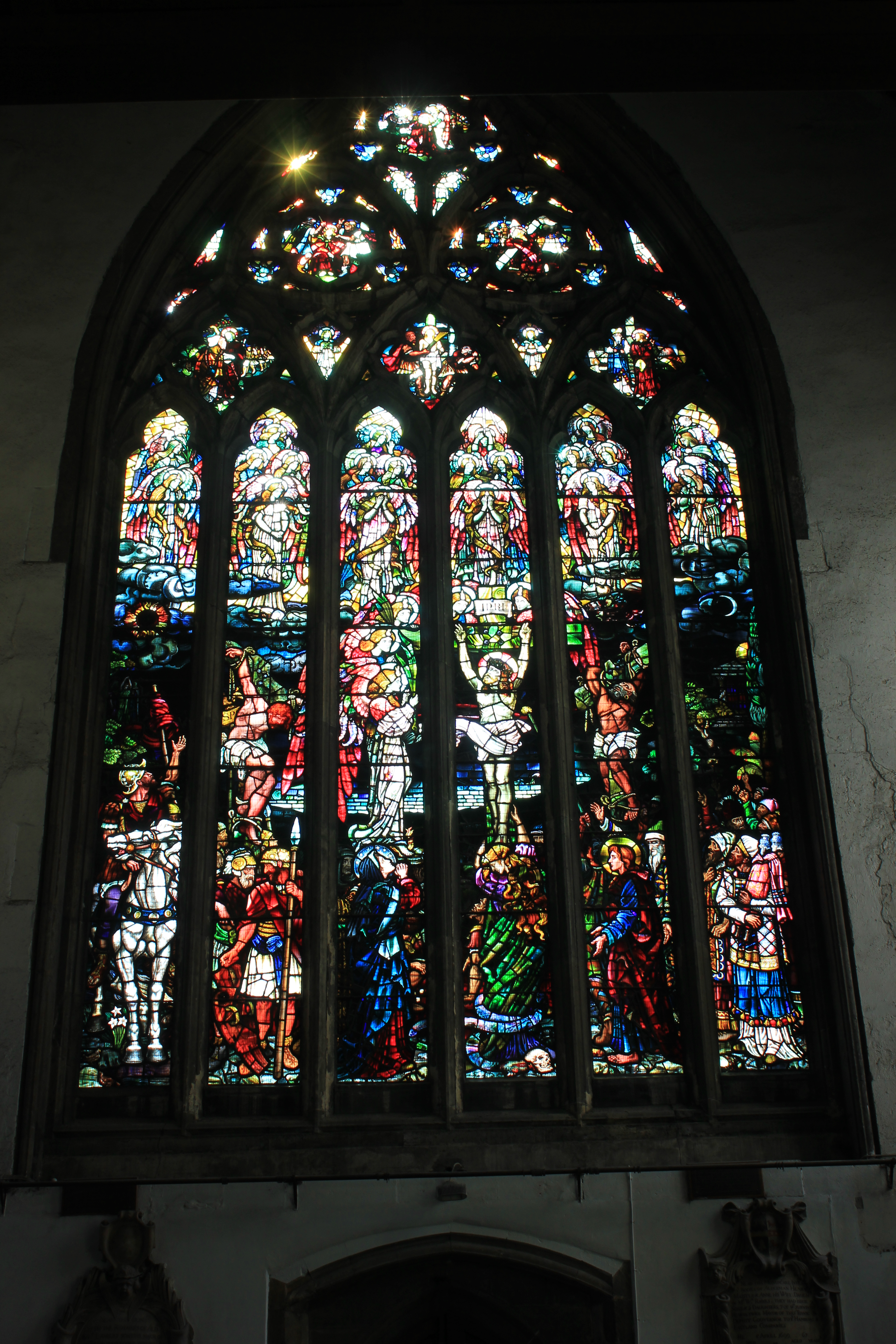
Hull Minster Inside

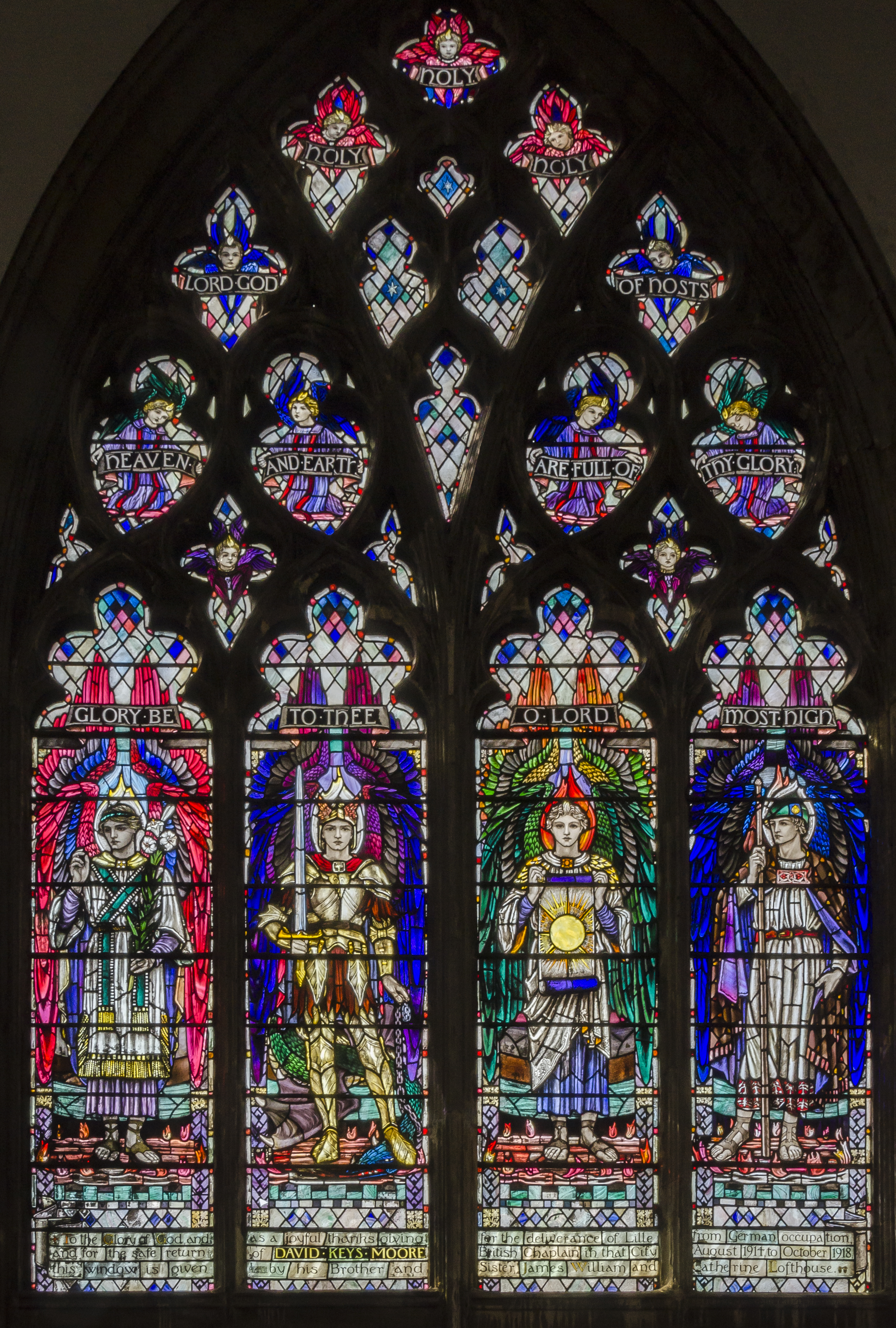
Hull Minster Inside

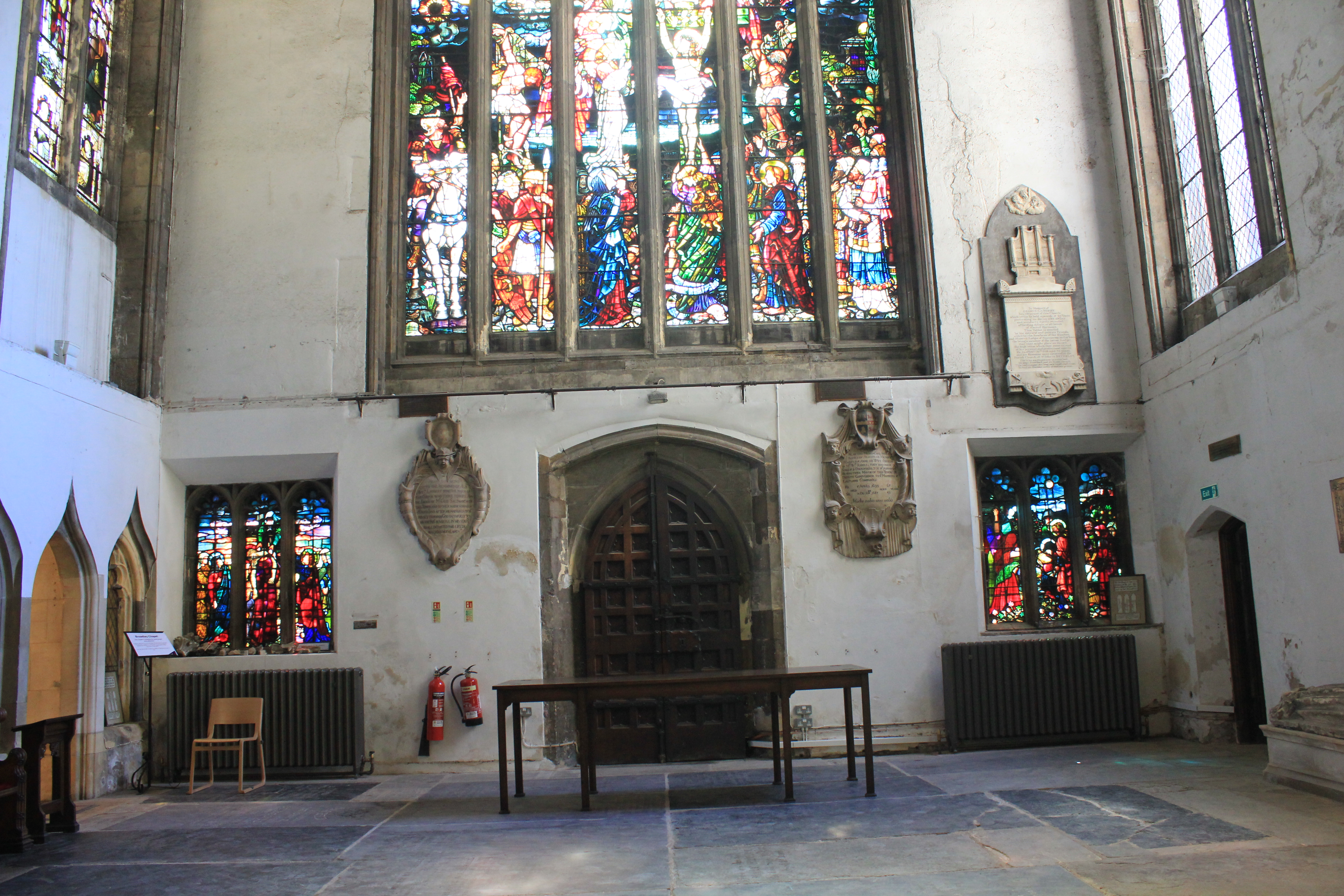
Hull Minster Inside

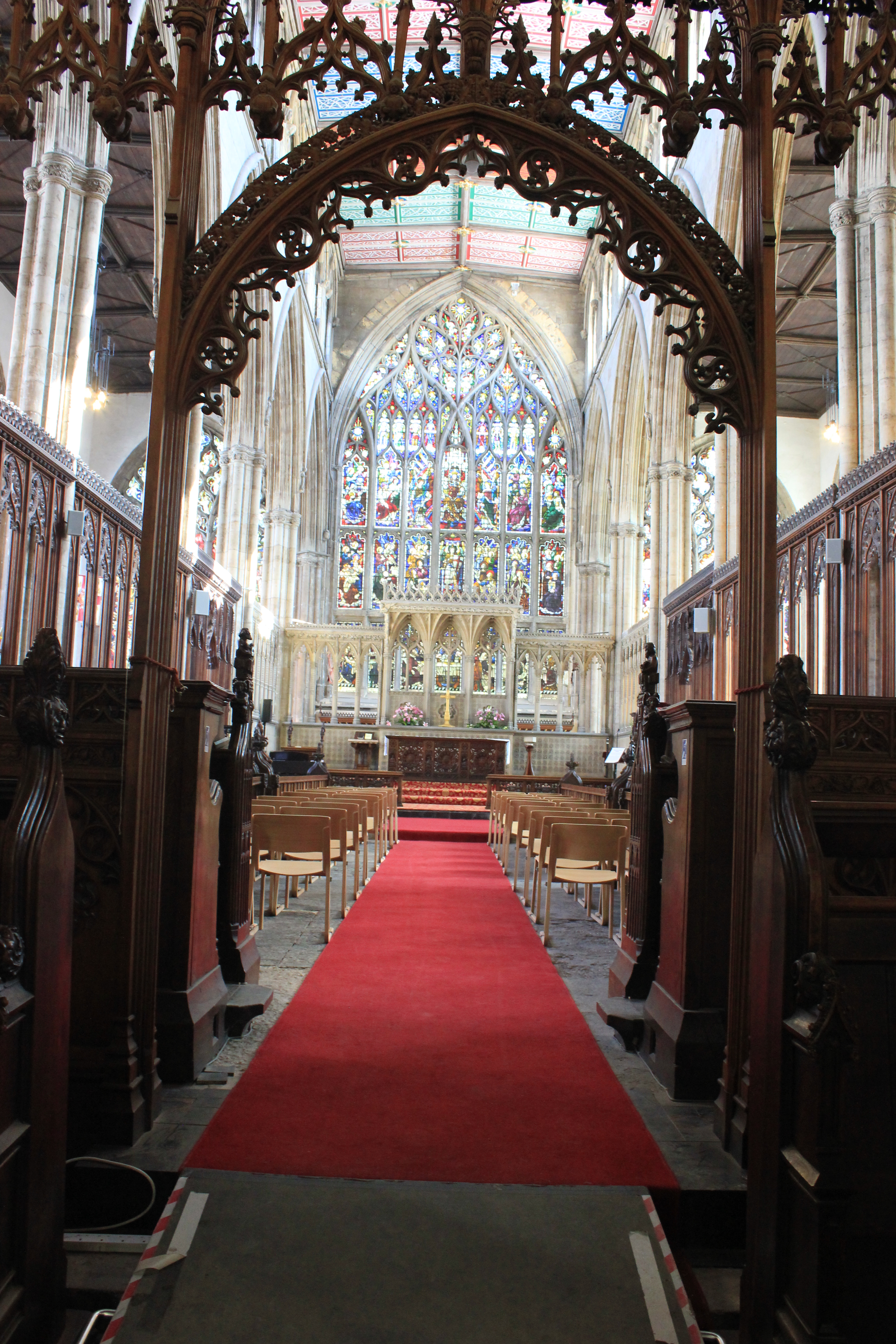
Hull Minster Inside

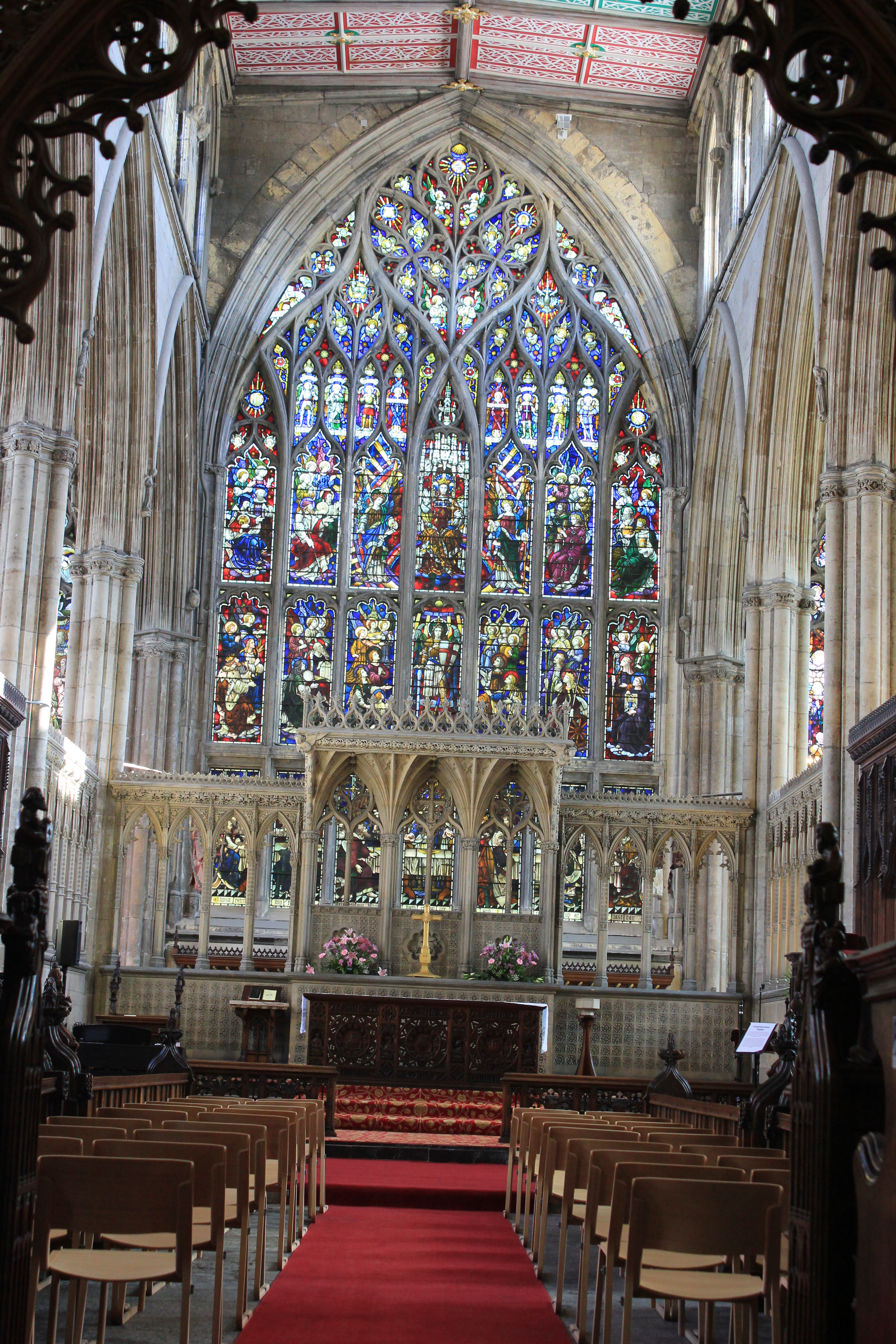
Hull Minster Inside

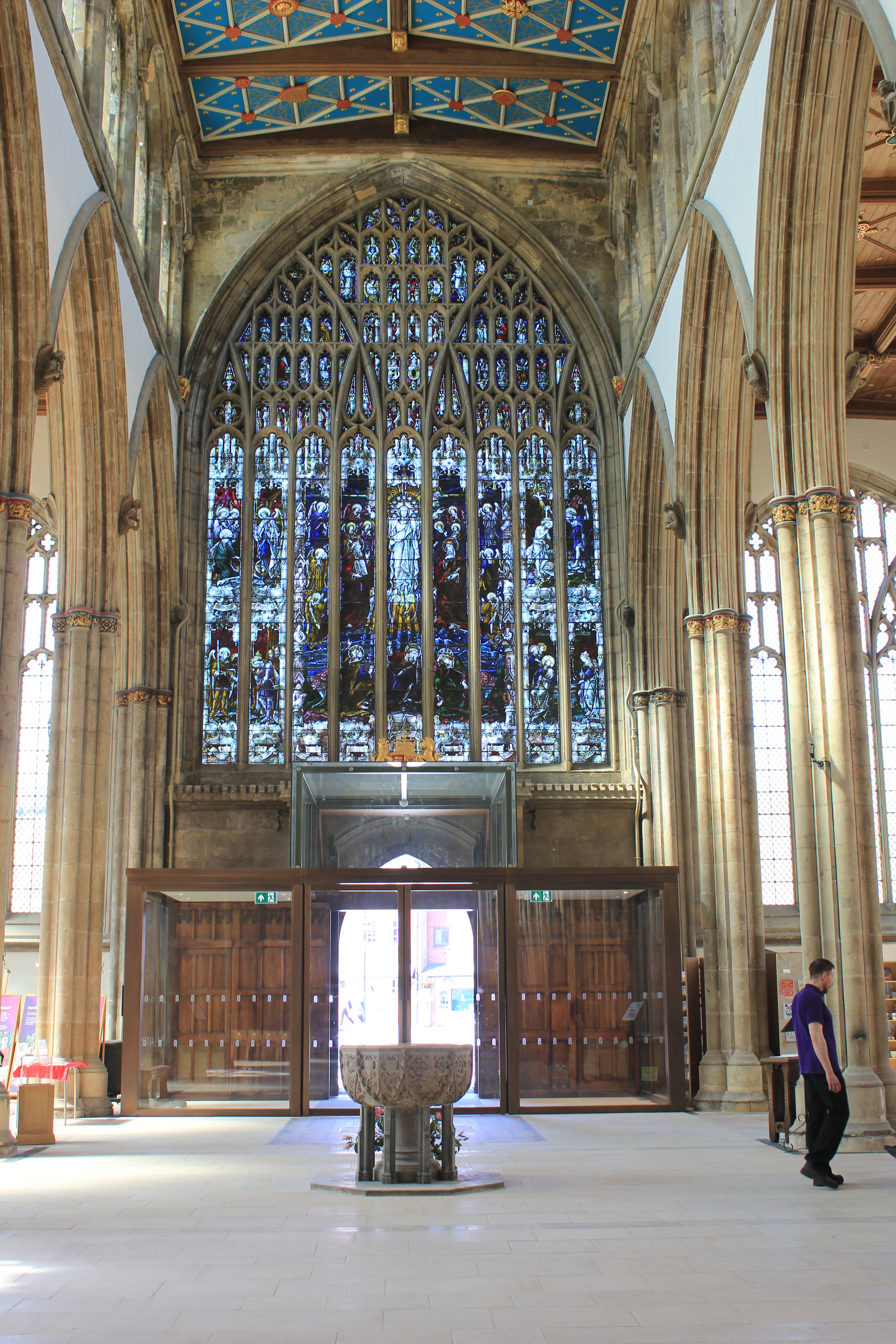
Hull Minster Inside

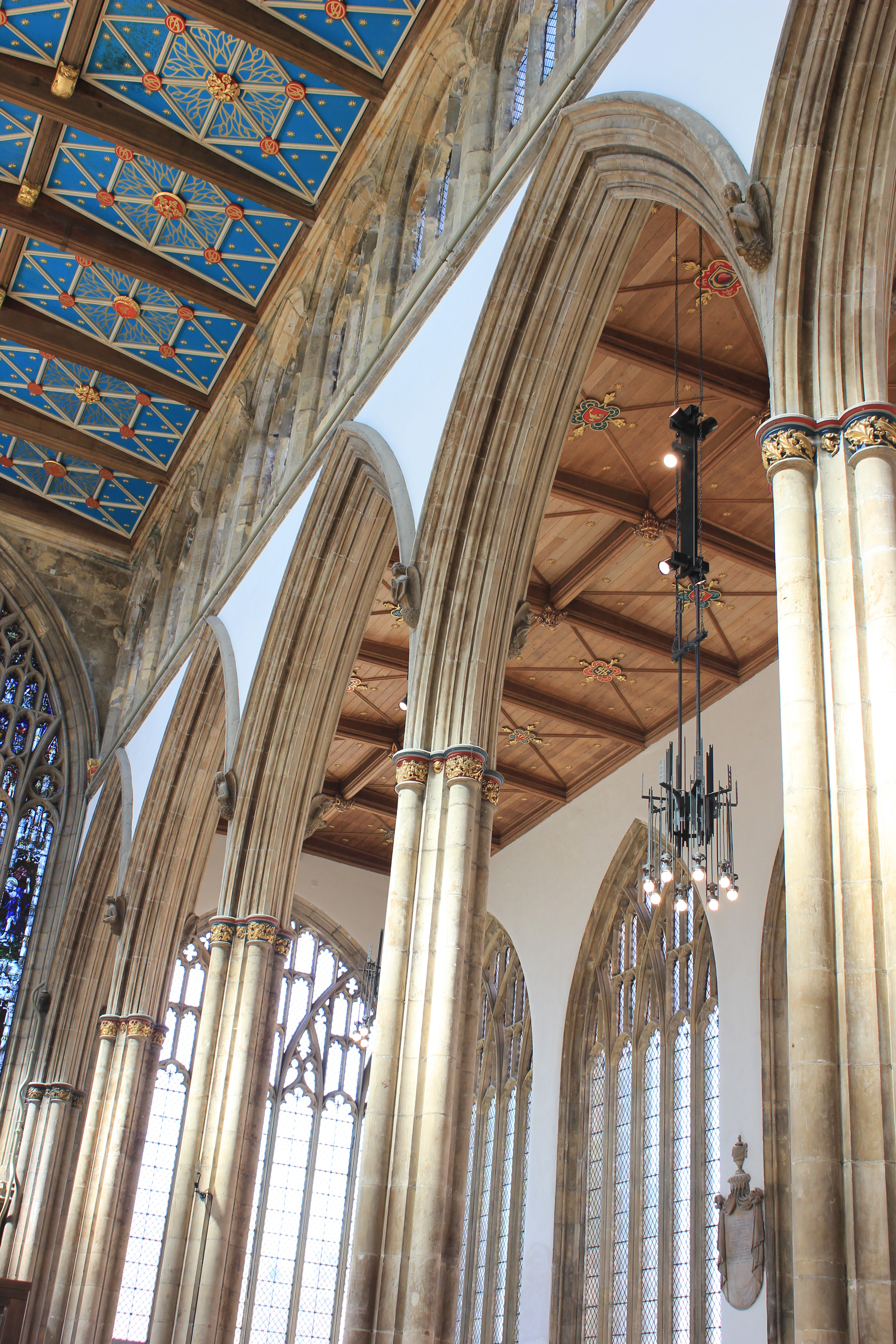
Hull Minster Inside

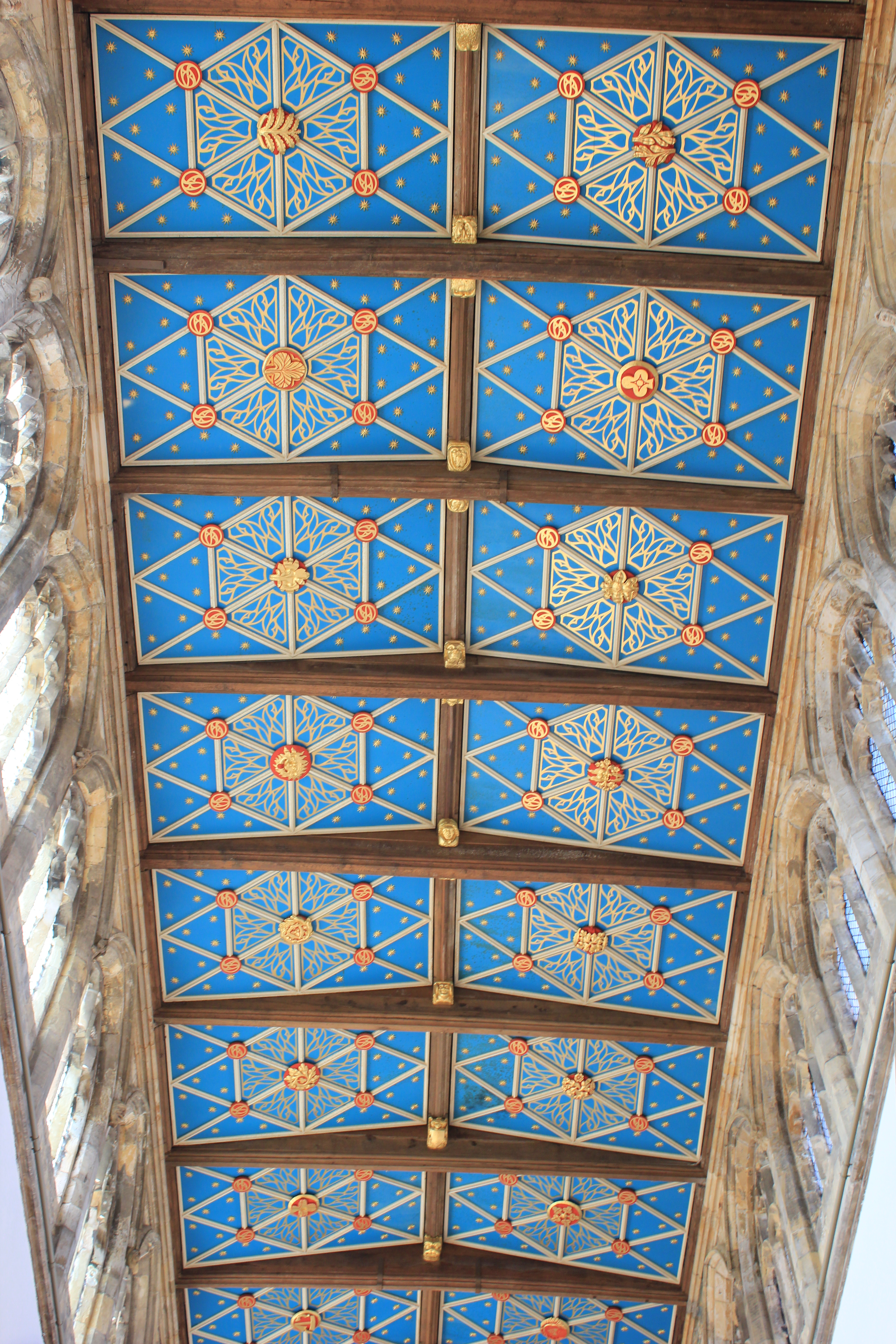
Hull Minster Inside

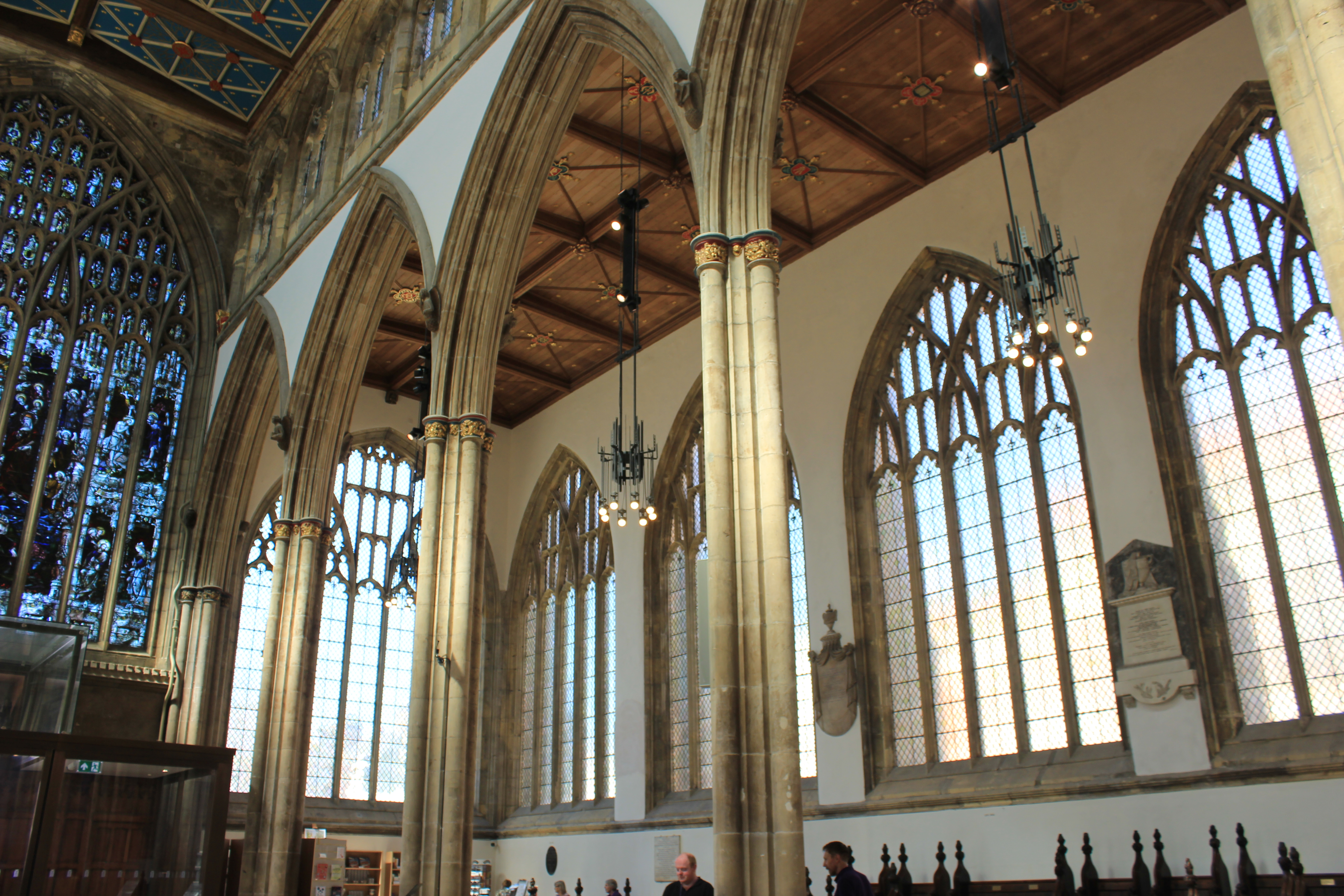
Hull Minster Inside

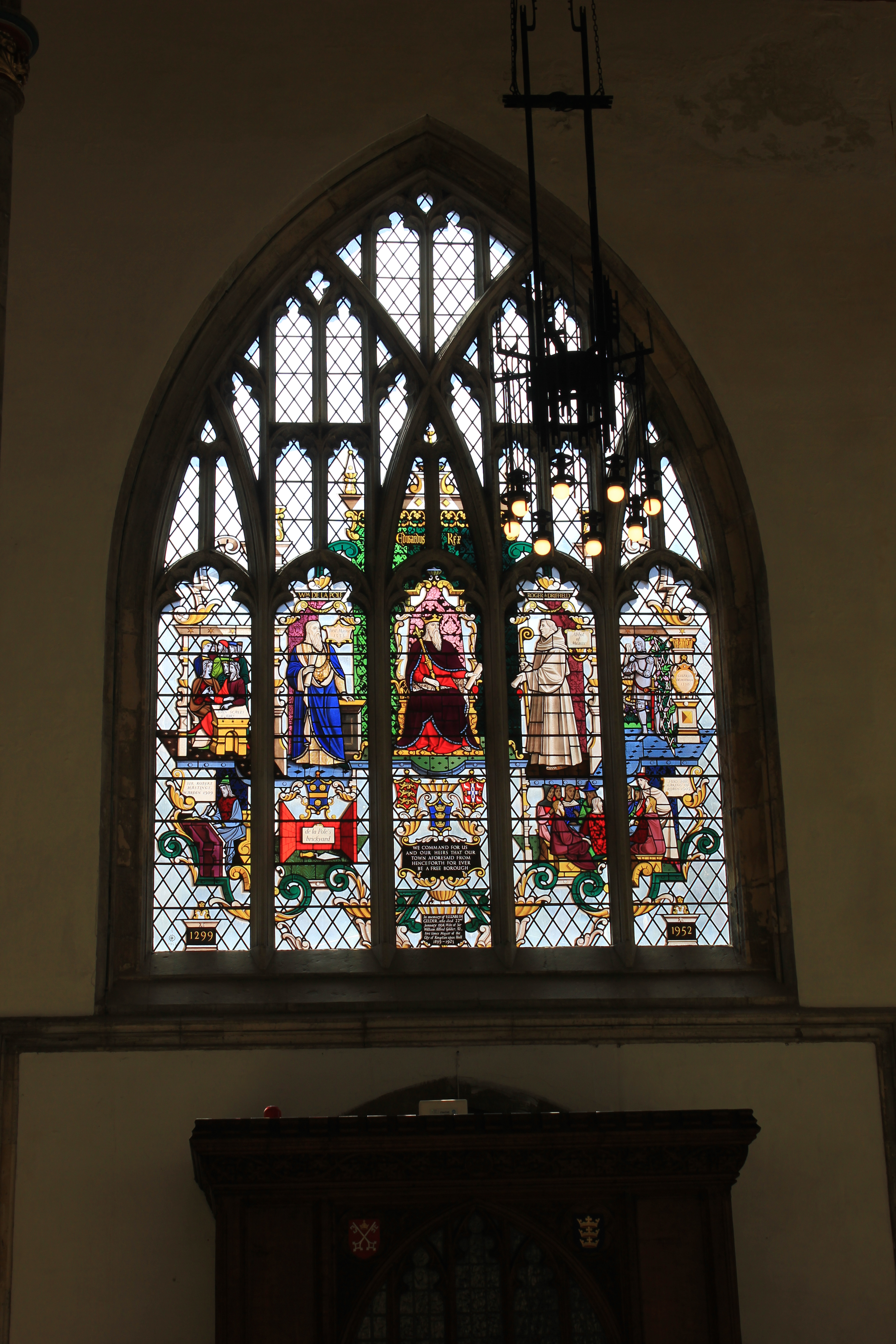
Hull Minster Inside

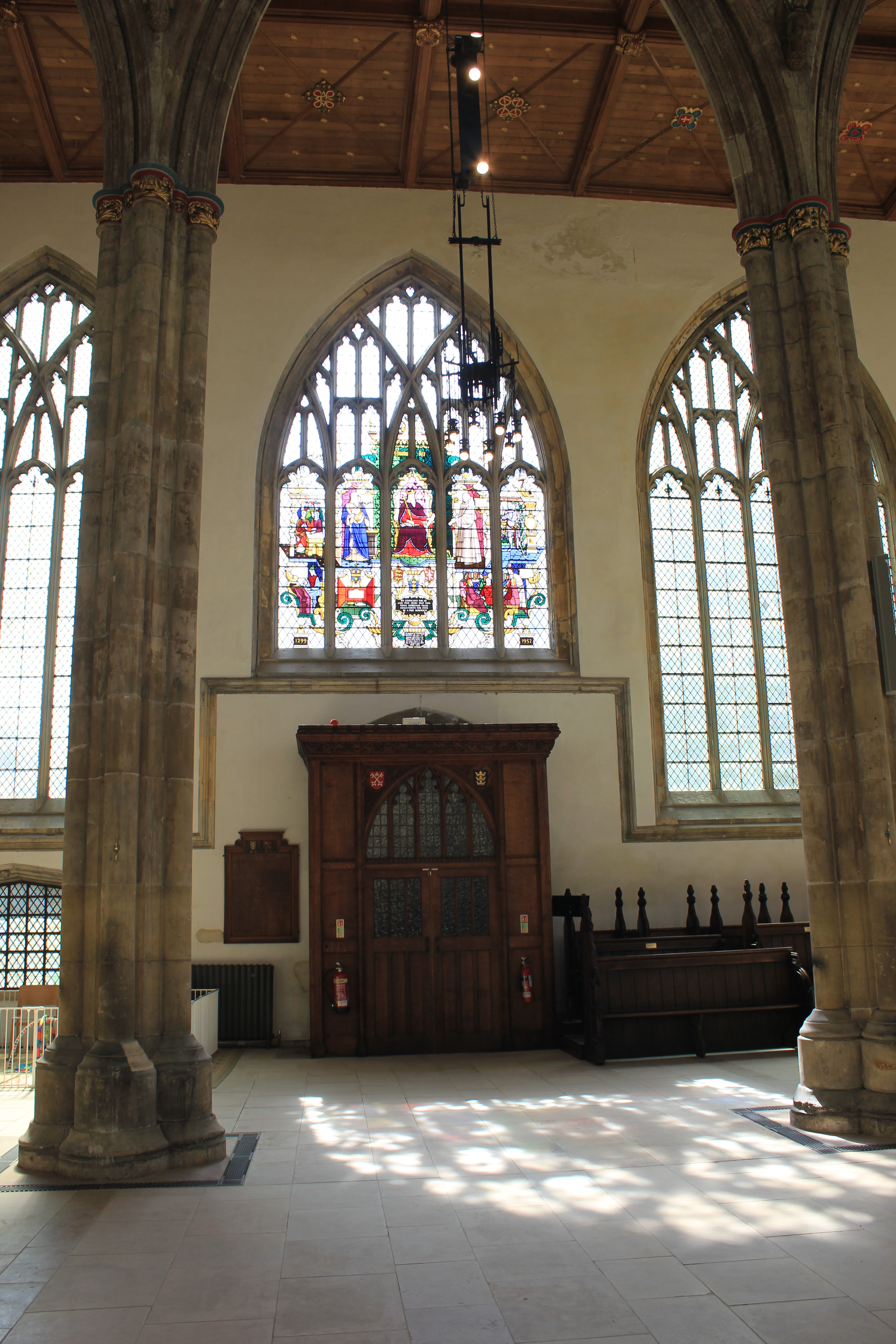
Hull Minster Inside

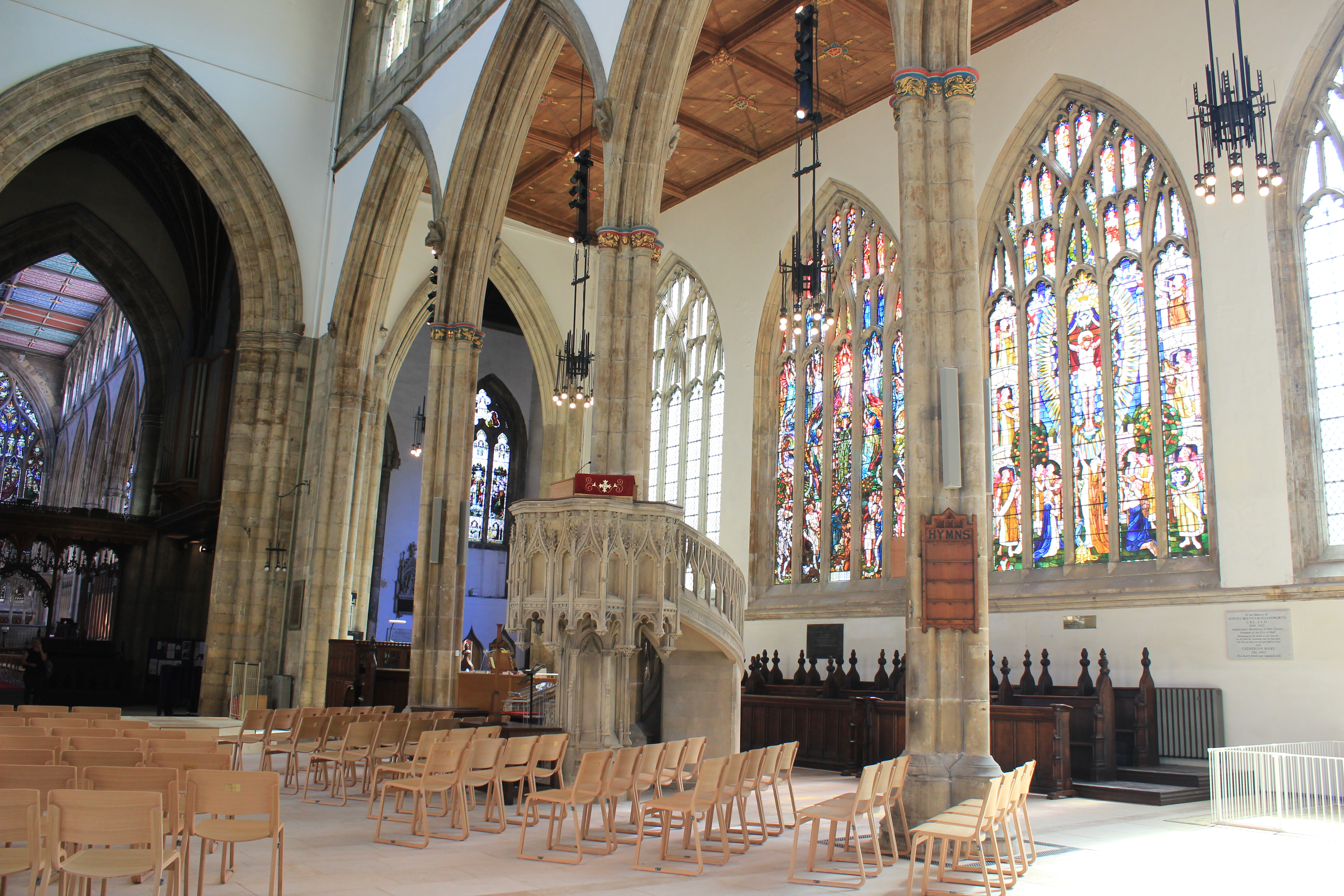
Hull Minster Inside

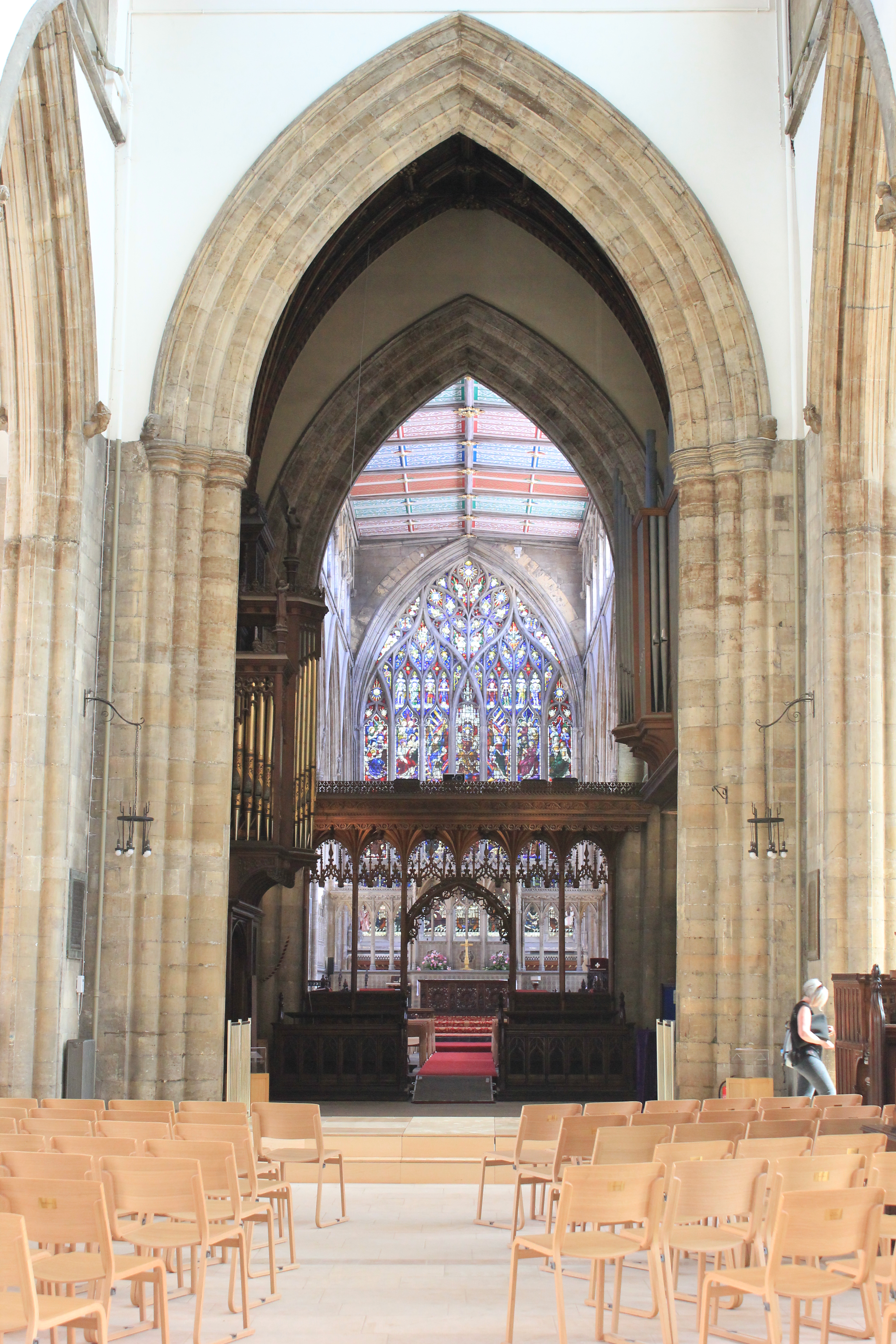
Hull Minster Inside

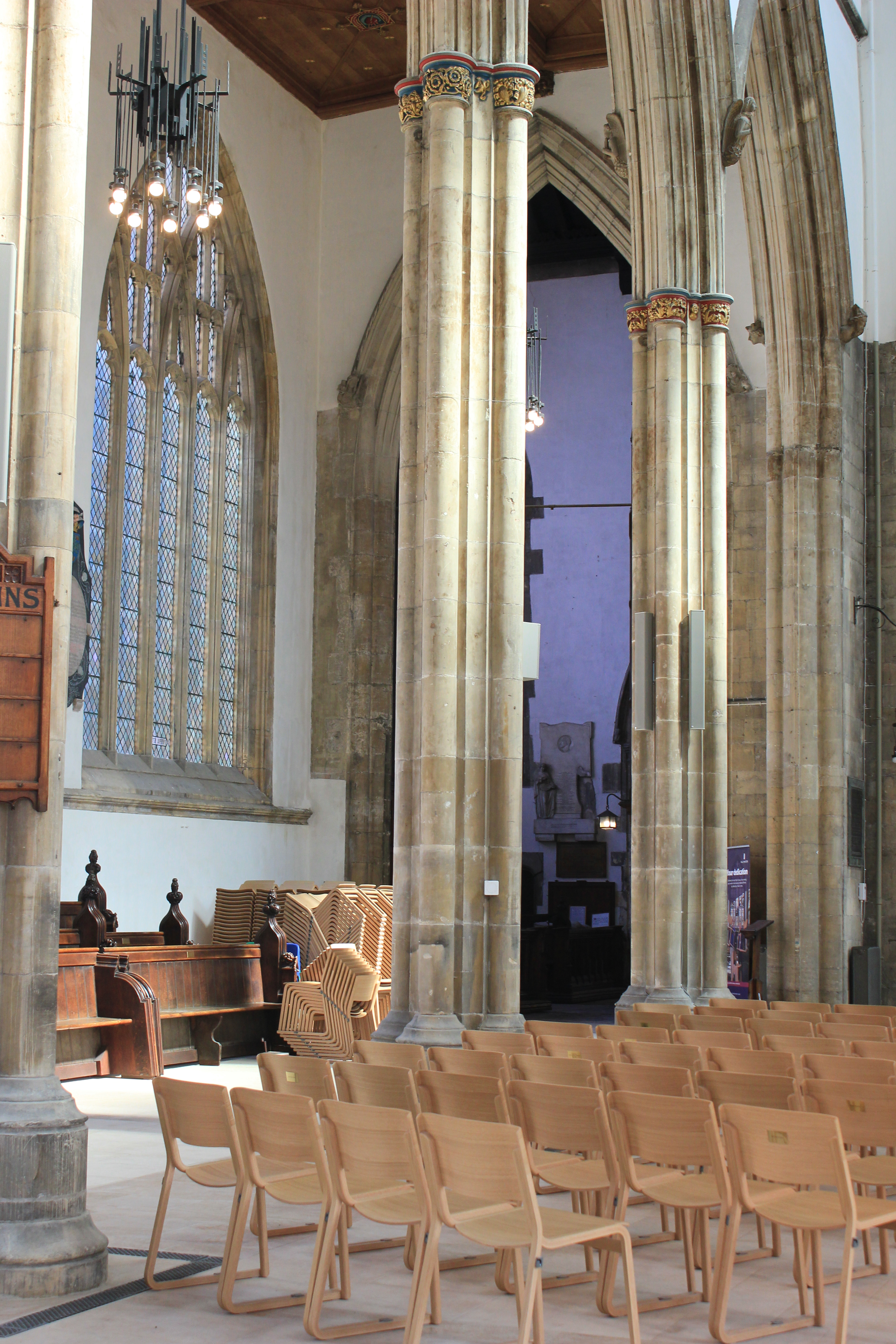
Hull Minster Inside

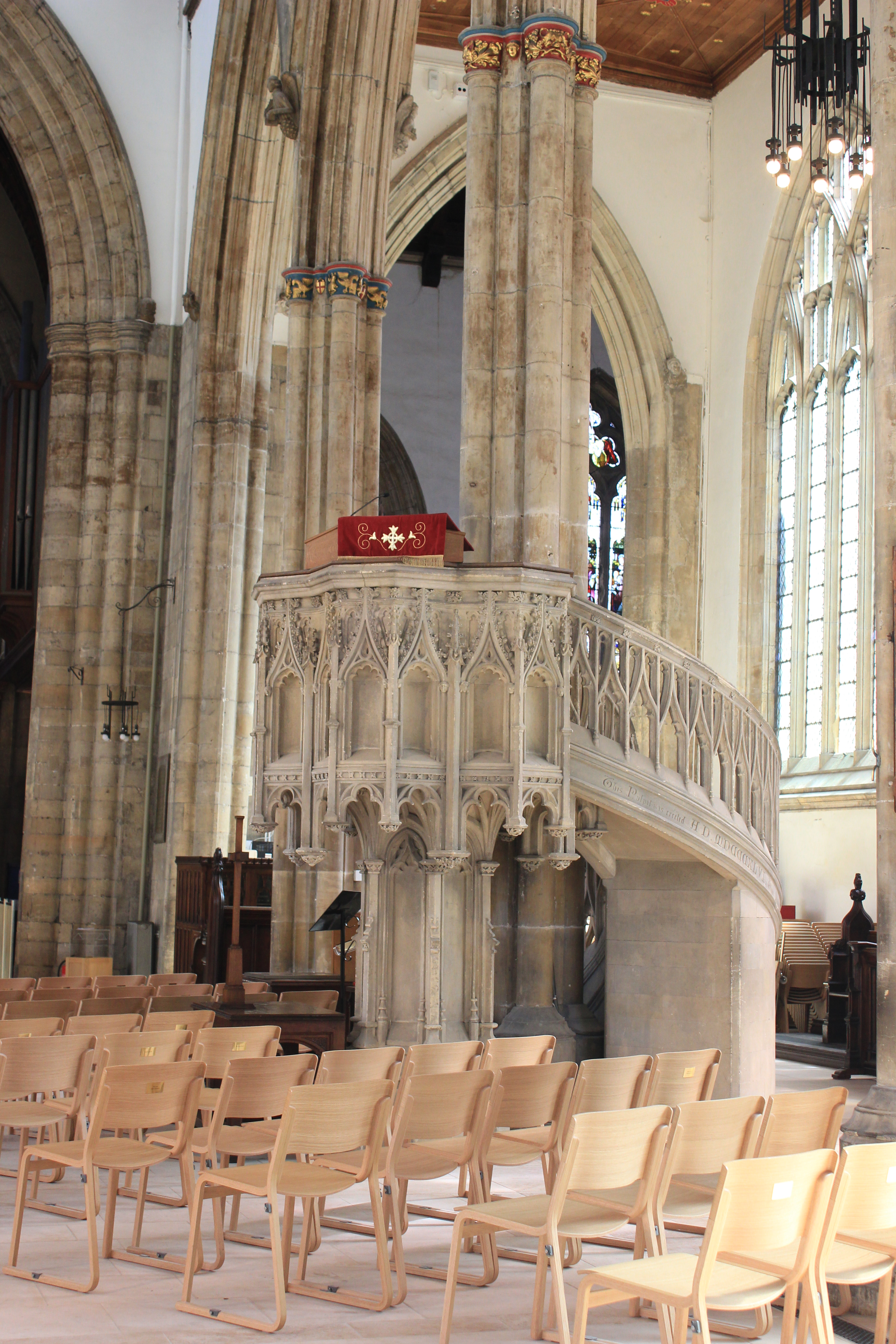
Hull Minster Inside

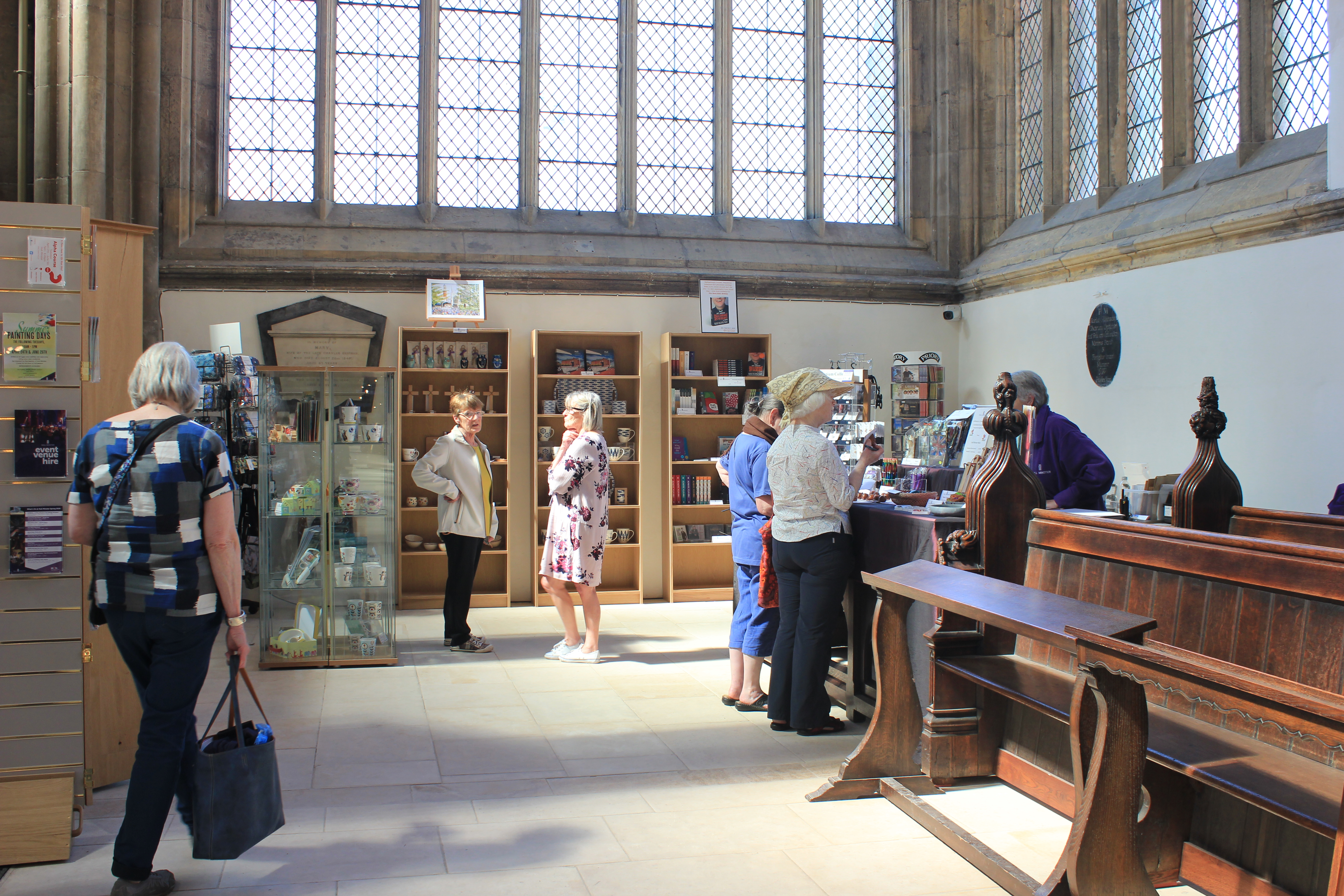
Hull Minster Inside

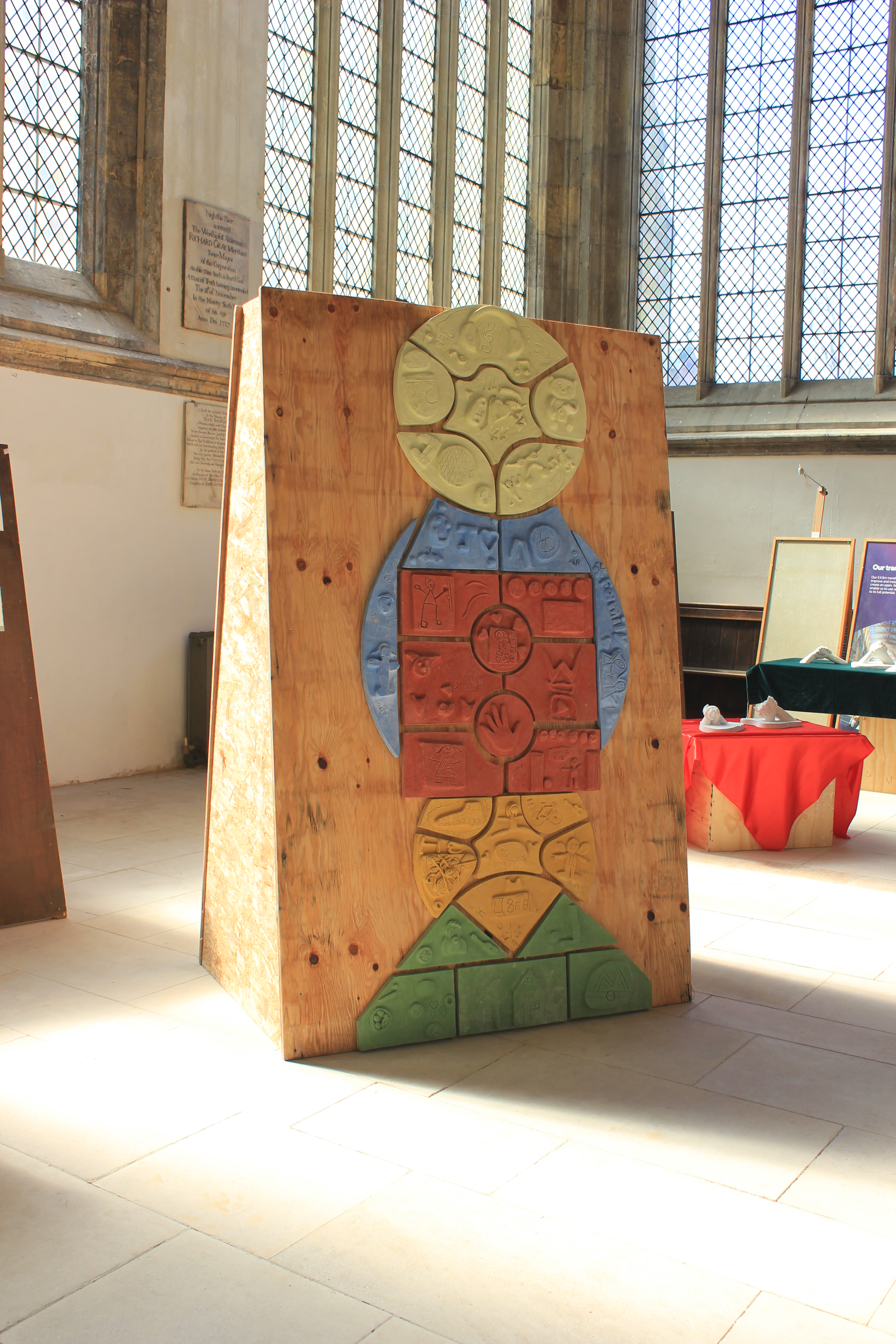
Hull Minster Inside

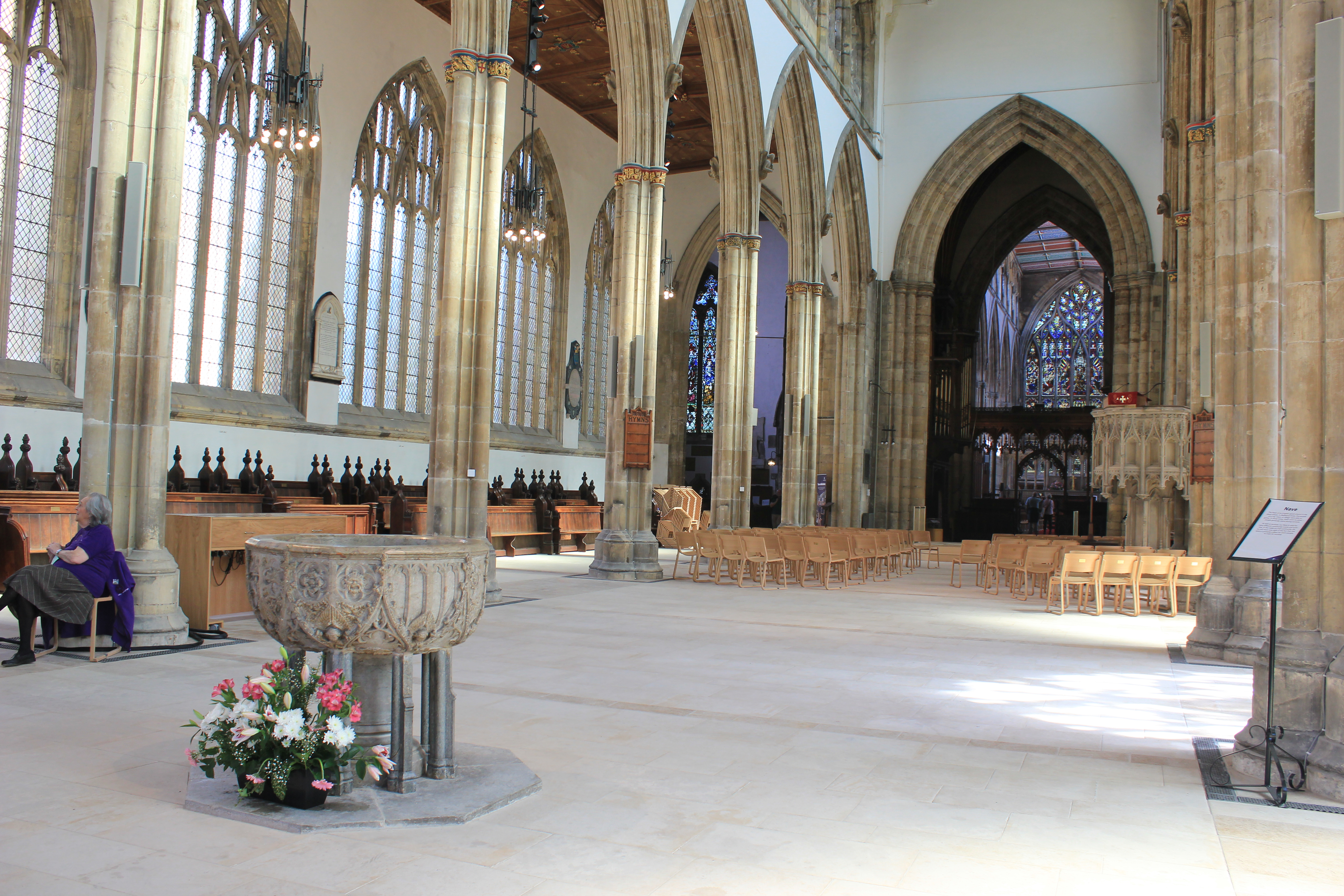
Hull Minster Inside

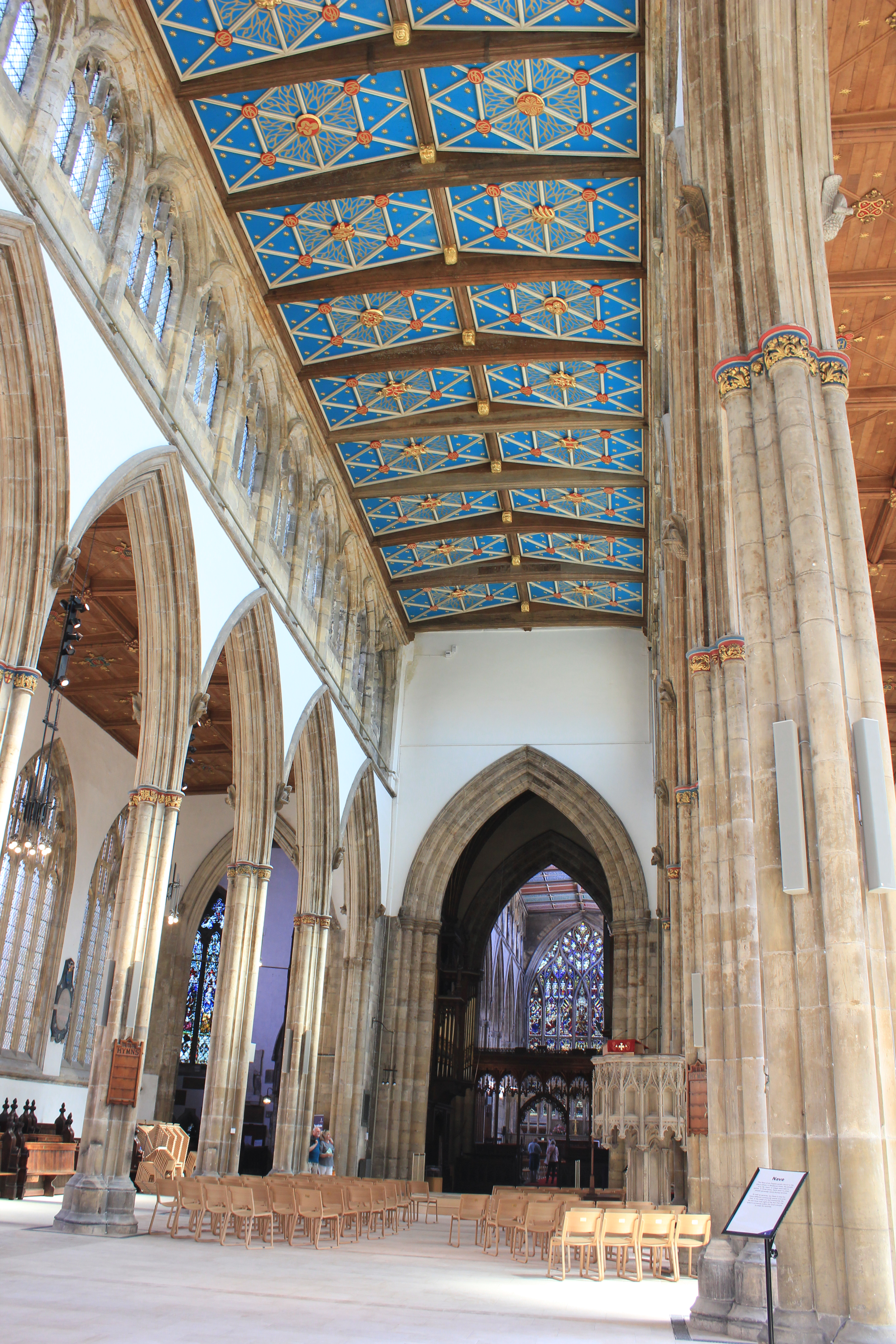
Hull Minster Inside

== See also ==
- Grade I listed churches in the East Riding of Yorkshire
- Listed buildings in Kingston upon Hull (Myton Ward)
- Hull Trinity House
