= 2020 Hong Kong Garrison helicopter crash =

Military helicopter crash in Hong Kong

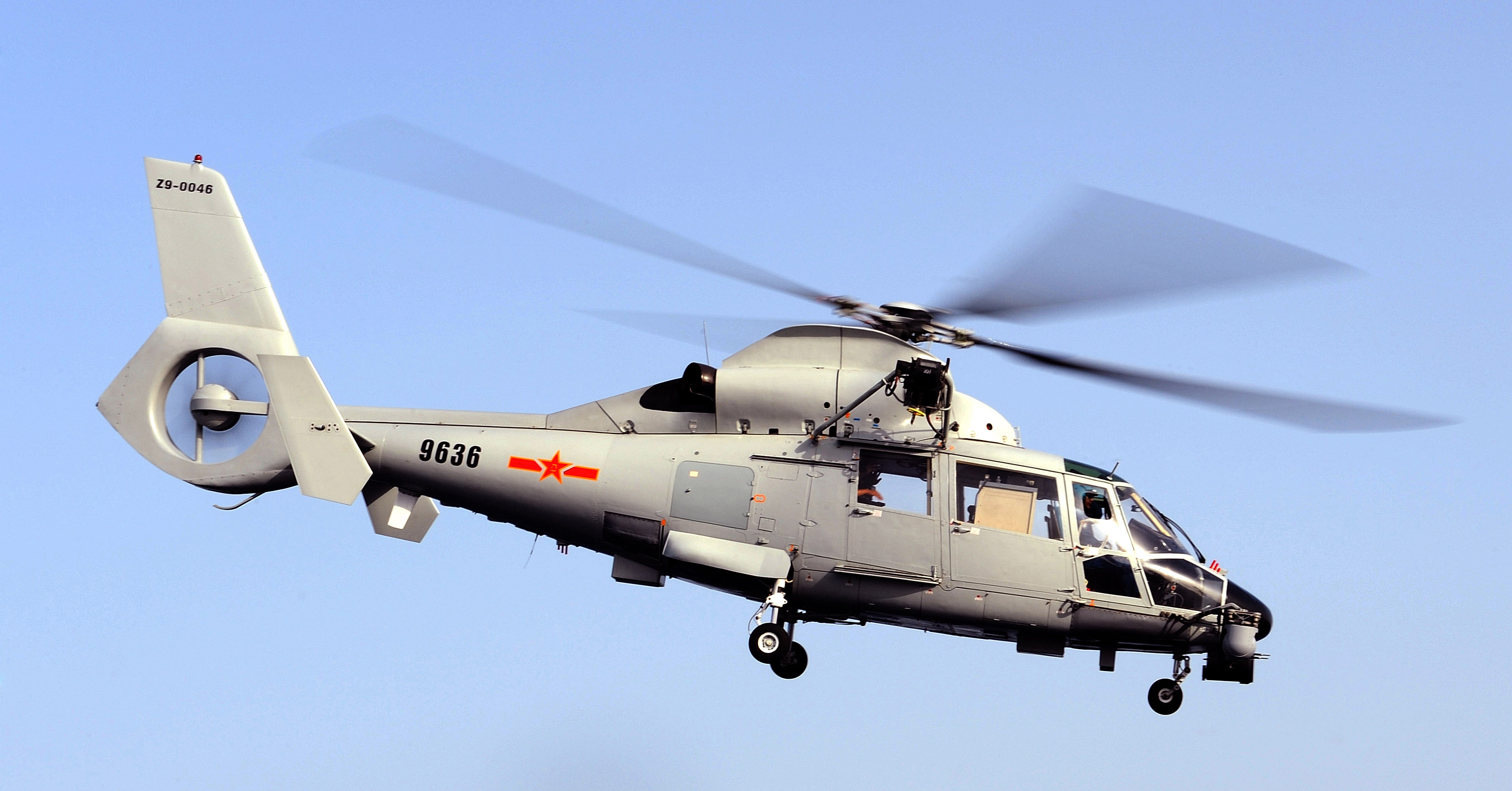
- A Chinese naval Z-9, same type of the helicopter involved in this incident, departs HMS Cornwall

Accident
- Date: 30 March 2020
- Summary: Controlled flight into terrain (likely)
- Site: Tai Lam Country Park, Hong Kong; 22.41492°N 114.09654°E (presumed)

Aircraft
- Aircraft type: Harbin Z-9
- Operator: Hong Kong Garrison of Chinese People's Liberation Army
- Crew: Undisclosed
- Fatalities: Undisclosed (possibly 4)
- Survivors: Undisclosed

A military helicopter of Hong Kong Garrison of Chinese People's Liberation Army crashed in Tai Lam Country Park, Hong Kong on 30 March 2020 during a flight training operation, reportedly killing four. The news was only confirmed a day later but no information was released regarding the crew. This is the first recorded aircraft accident involving the Chinese troops in Hong Kong since handover, and raised speculation on the details.

== Accident ==
According to the government, which received notification from the garrison, the helicopter was conducting flight training operation in the area of the Tai Lam Country Park in that afternoon. Villagers in Chuen Lung who witnessed the crash said there was heavy fog when the helicopter is believed to have crashed into an electricity transmission tower by accident. The chopper's noise stopped after explosions were heard, but no smoke or fire could be seen. The lost helicopter is believed to be a Harbin Z-9 (no. 6202).

CLP Group confirmed a voltage dip incident at 4:48 p.m. at a 400kV overhead line power cable connecting Lung Kwu Tan and Sha Tin which lasted for less than 0.1 seconds. The fire service received 42 reports of lift malfunction across the city within 15 minutes after the incident, while Chuen Lung residents also reported a sudden loss of electricity. Photos showed the tower and parts of the cable were damaged.

A dozen of military vehicles and large group of soldiers were spotted by nearby Lui Kung Tin villagers soon after the accident. A number of helicopter flew near the location but turned away likely because of the weather condition. According to the villagers and hikers, at 7 a.m. on the next day more than a hundred military personnel, along with many police officers, entered Tai Lam Country Park via Lui Kung Tin. Some had shovels and other tools in their hands. By 9 a.m. the site was sealed off by the police and the garrison. Witnesses said a senior soldier from Hong Kong Garrison claimed there was a military exercise for the large presence of soldiers. The officers stayed for hours and remained at the crash site after 2 p.m., while CLP maintenance vehicles also travelled uphill afterwards.

== Reaction ==
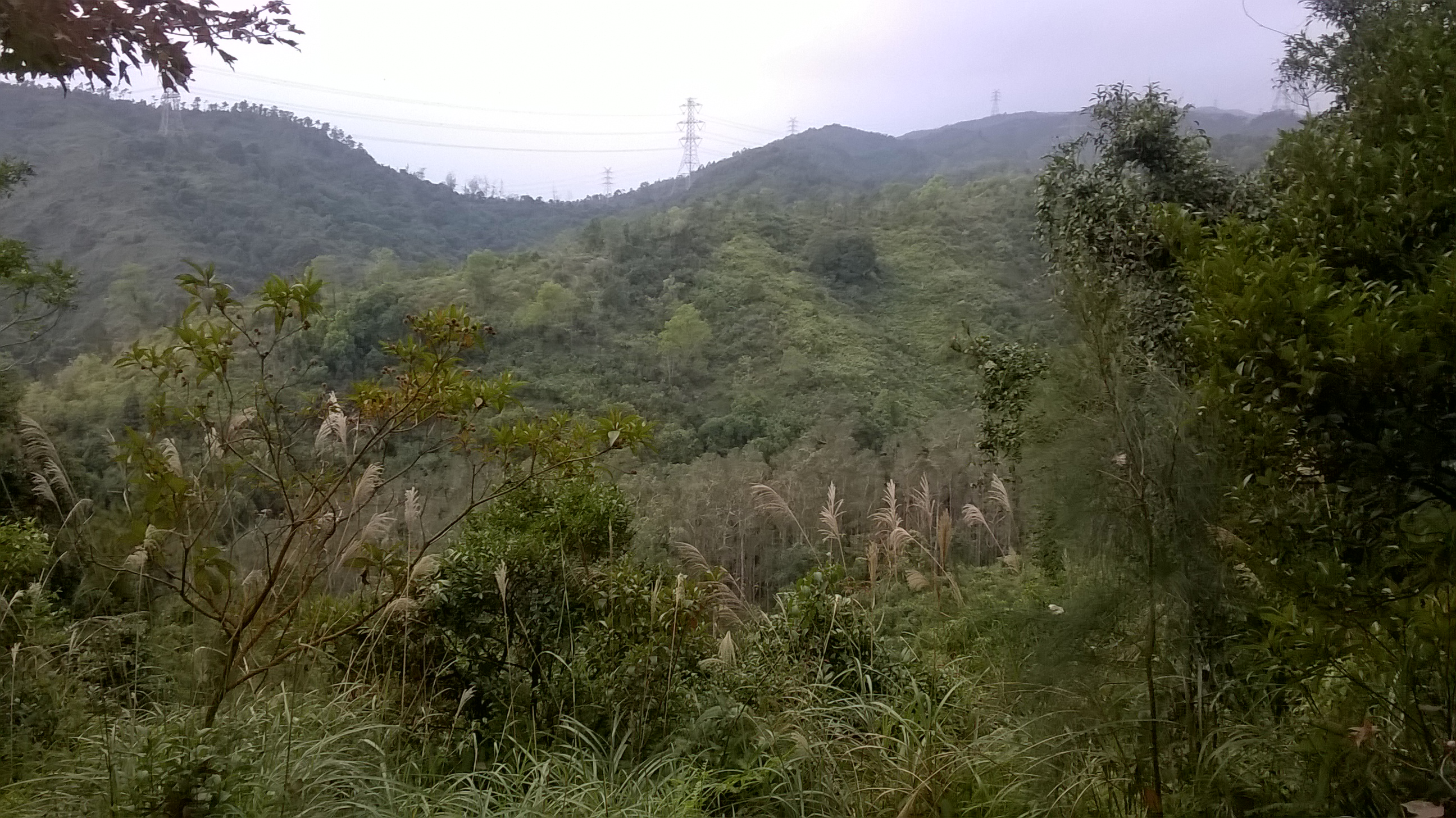
Tai Lam Country Park (transmission towers could be seen at the background)

The government confirmed the news after 8 p.m. through press release, more than 27 hours after the accident. The Chinese statement described it as a crash but the English version termed "accident". Neither provided details about what had happened apart from no ground injuries.

... A notification was received from the Chinese People's Liberation Army Hong Kong Garrison (the Garrison) today to inform the Security Bureau of an accident involving a helicopter of the Garrison which occurred in the afternoon of March 30 during the Garrison's flight training operation conducted in the area of the Tai Lam Country Park. The incident did not involve any injury to people or damage to residences. The Garrison is handling and investigating the incident in accordance with the Garrison Law. The Security Bureau will continue to liaise with the Garrison on the incident.

The fire service said they have no relevant record on handling a helicopter incident in Tai Lam.

The pro-democracy camp urged for transparency in this event. Eddie Chu, who was one of the first public figures to break the news, demanded the Security Bureau to reveal more details on the most serious accident involving the Hong Kong garrison since the handover, including the casualties and crew information. He also enquired the impact on the electricity supply by the crash and whether the garrison notified the authorities of the training in accordance with garrison law. MP James To said the crash may involve military confidential information and would not notify the government until the site was cleared. To added however that public safety could be harmed by bullets or wrecks if it was not announced immediately. Jeremy Tam, a former pilot and now a pro-democracy legislator, agreed the delay on announcement and cordoning off the area could worry hikers who had no knowledge on the event. He said Civil Aviation Department has no power to investigate and the crash would be dealt with by the garrison.

Journalists searched for the wreck near Tsing Tam reservoir. On 2 April, 25 square metres (270 sq ft) of flatted bushes with cracked trunk and cable was found on a slope near Kap Lung Forest Trail. Fuel could also be smelled from the area. Debris of the helicopter including suspected control panel, buttons of equipment were seen alongside pieces of military uniform, glucose injections, and flying manual of Harbin Z-9. However, no large pieces of wrecks or blood stain were seen. Lunchboxes and water bottles of Chinese brand Nongfu Spring were disposed on a nearby path that appears to be created recently. A day later, a group of men was seen carrying a suspected plane debris away. None told the journalists of their identity or the item they took away.
