= Muk Min Ha =

Village in Tsuen Wan District in Hong Kong

Coordinates: 22.376234°N 114.118212°E

Muk Min Ha (Chinese: 木棉下村) is a village in Tsuen Wan District, Hong Kong.

== Administration ==
Muk Min Ha is a recognized village under the New Territories Small House Policy.

== See also ==
- Chuen Lung
- Kap Lung
