= Yuen Tun Tsuen =

Village of Hong Kong

Coordinates: 22.36258°N 114.04629°E

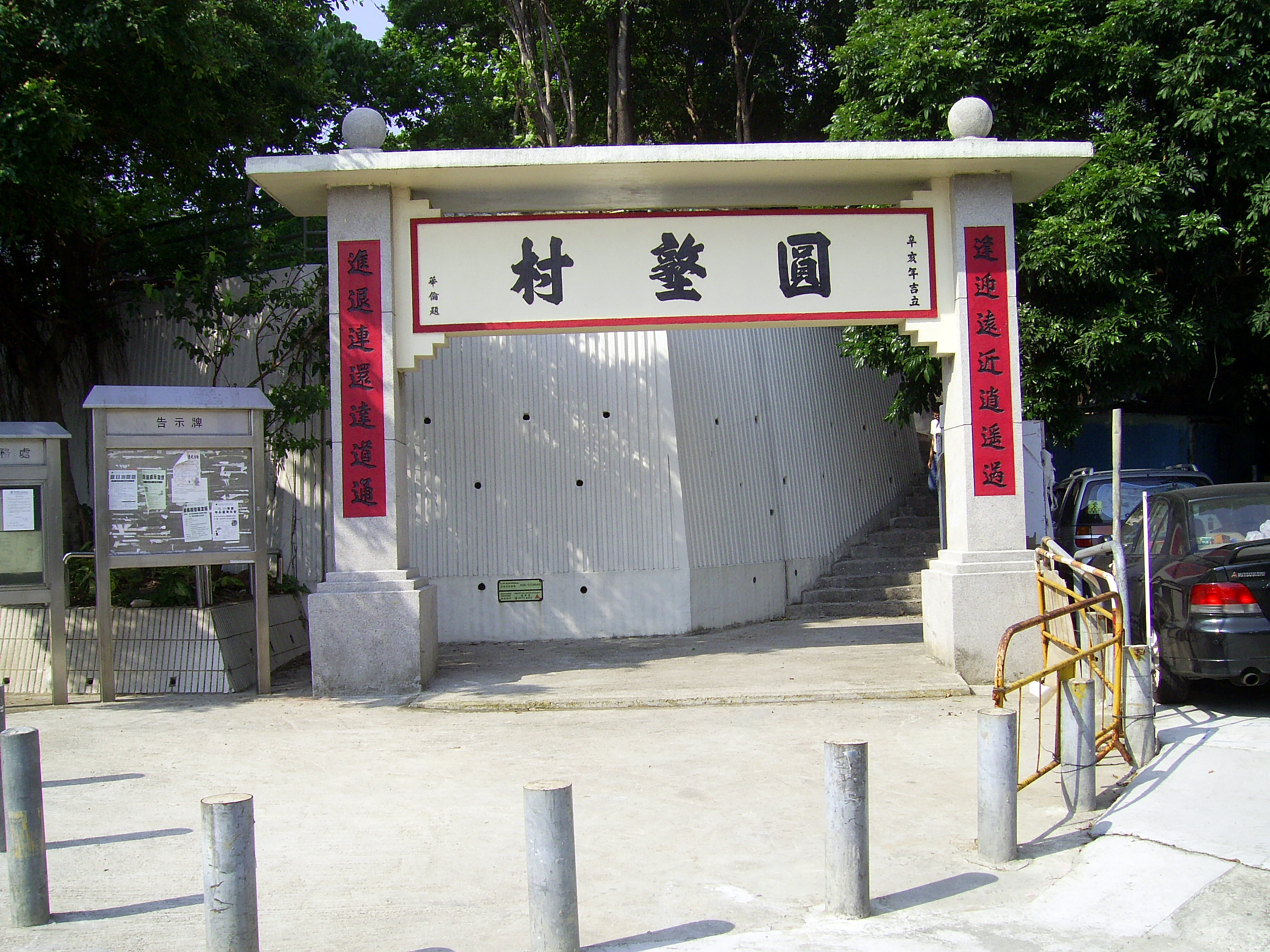
Gateway of Yuen Tun Village in May 2009.

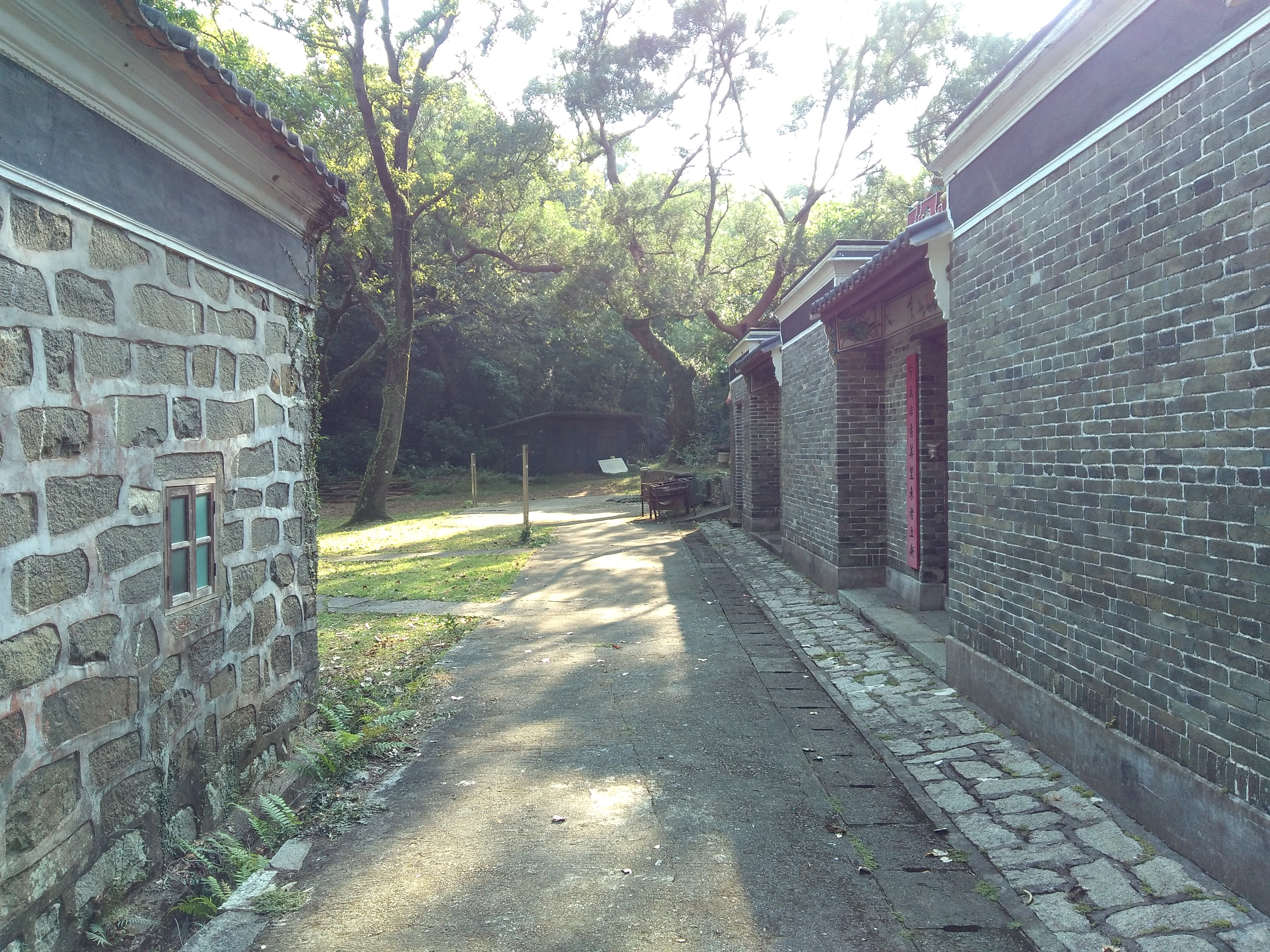
Houses and former Chung Ancestral Hall of the old Yuen Tun village, now part of the Yuen Tun Camp of the Civil Aid Service, within Tai Lam Country Park.

Yuen Tun Tsuen or Yuen Tun Village (Chinese: 圓墩村) is a village in Tsing Lung Tau, Tsuen Wan District, Hong Kong.

== History ==
Interviews conducted in 1982 mentioned that "When Tsing Yi villagers wanted to marry, they looked for partners from Tin Fu Tsai, Tsuen Wan and Yuen Tun."
