= Kap Lung =

Coordinates: 22.419789°N 114.104575°E

Kap Lung (Chinese: 甲龍) is a village in Pat Heung, Yuen Long District, Hong Kong.

== Administration ==
Kap Lung is a recognized village under the New Territories Small House Policy.

== History ==
Kap Lung has a history of over 200 years. The ancestors of its indigenous inhabitants originated from Shandong. One of their descendants' families moved to Muk Min Ha in Tsuen Wan during the Ming dynasty. Some later moved to Chuen Lung in the Tai Mo Shan area while some others moved to Kap Lung as a consequence of pirate invasion. Indigenous Kap Lung inhabitants with the surname Tsang had moved out from the 1950s.

The Kap Lung Ancient Trail, named after Kap Lung Village, was historically the main route taken by farmers in the vicinity of Pat Heung, Shek Kong and Lui Kung Tin for selling their produce in the markets in Tsuen Wan.
