= Sheung Tong =

Coordinates: 22.3887877°N 114.0818280°E

Sheung Tong (Chinese: 上塘) is a village in the Tsuen Wan District of Hong Kong.

== Administration ==
Sheung Tong is a recognized village under the New Territories Small House Policy.

== History ==
At the time of the 1911 census, the population of Sheung Tong was 77. The number of males was 36.

The former Lin Fa Shan Mine was located near Sheung Tong.

== See also ==
- Yuen Tsuen Ancient Trail
- Mining in Hong Kong
