= Tin Fu Tsai =

Coordinates: 22.394424°N 114.062365°E

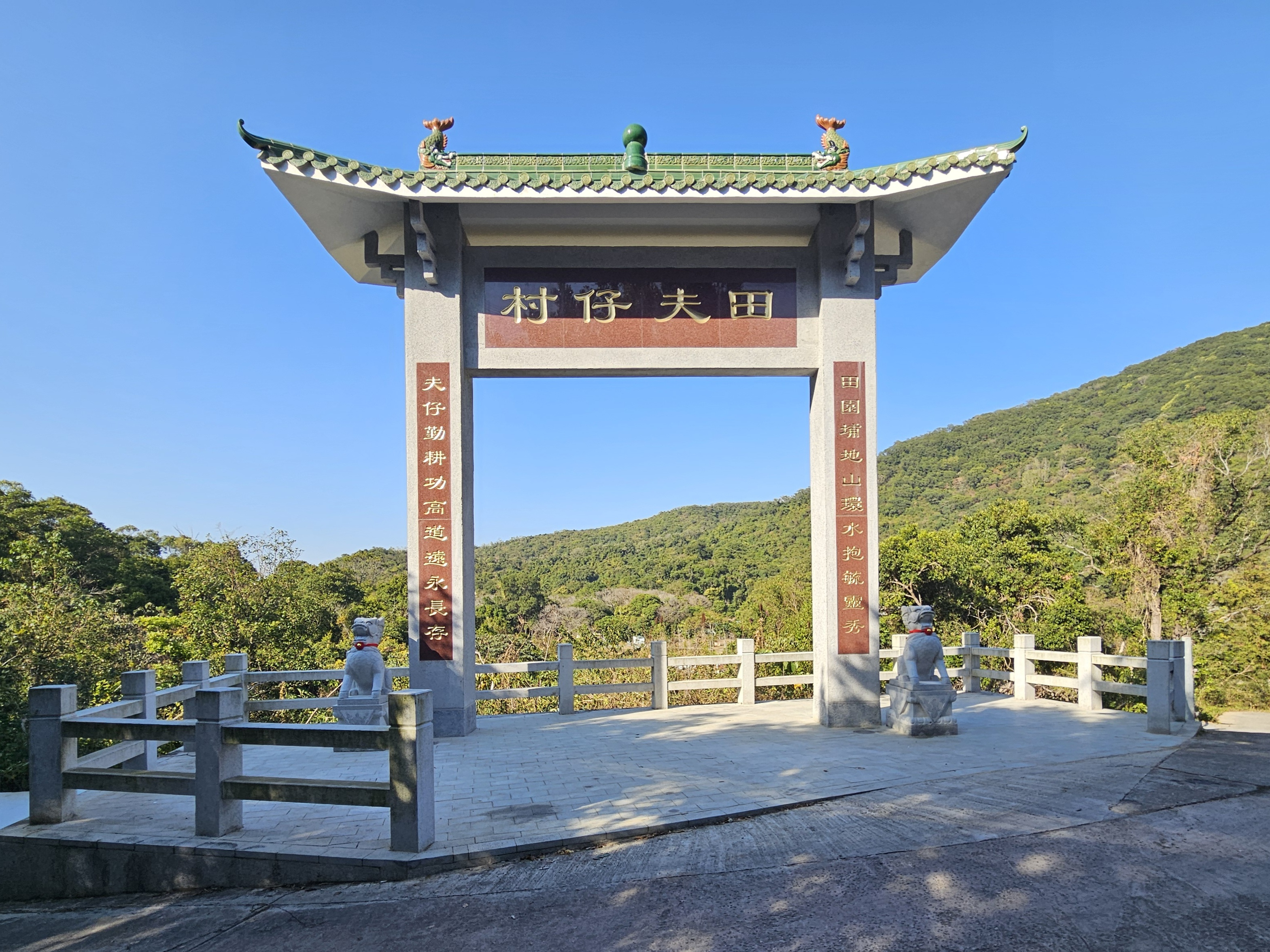
Entrance of Tin Fu Tsai

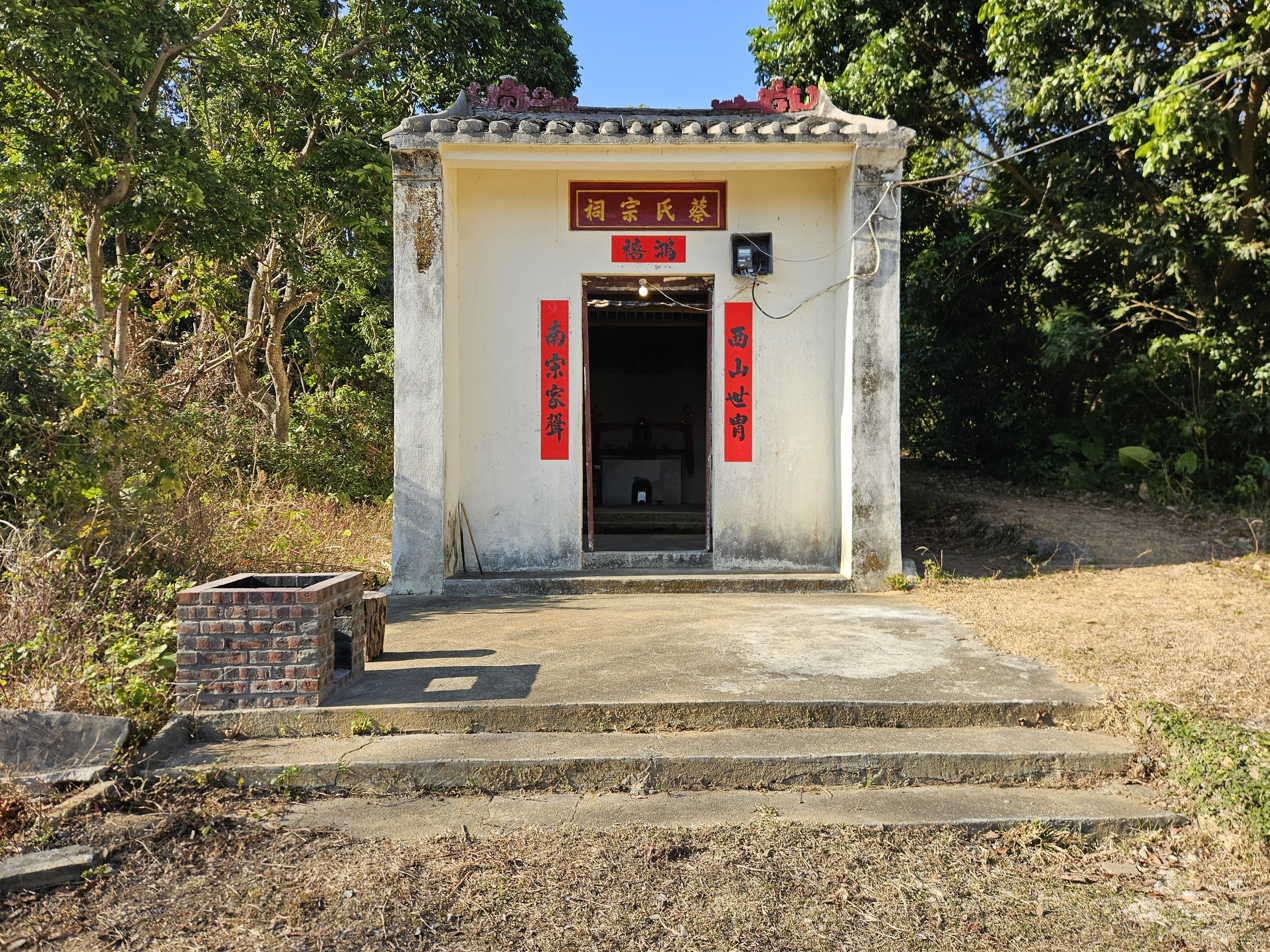
Choi Ancestral Hall in Tin Fu Tsai

Tin Fu Tsai, sometimes transliterated as Tin Fu Chai (Chinese: 田夫仔), is a village in Tuen Mun District, Hong Kong.

== Administration ==
Tin Fu Tsai is a recognized village under the New Territories Small House Policy. It is one of the 36 villages represented within the Tuen Mun Rural Committee.

== History ==
Tin Fu Tsai was founded 300 years ago by the Choi clan. It had a population of several hundred villagers during its peak time and was considered a large and influential village in the Pat Heung area. The village is still inhabited by some indigenous villagers.

Interviews conducted in 1982 mentioned that "When Tsing Yi villagers wanted to marry, they looked for partners from Tin Fu Tsai, Tsuen Wan and Yuen Tun."

== Features ==
The Tin Fu Tsai Campsite (Chinese: 田夫仔營地) is located near the village. The campsite is located within Tai Lam Country Park.

== Access ==
Tin Fu Tsai is located at the junction of Stage 9 and Stage 10 of the MacLehose Trail. It is also located along the Yuen Tsuen Ancient Trail.

== See also ==
- Ho Pui Reservoir
- Tai Lam Chung Reservoir
- Tsing Fai Tong
