= Nam Hang Tsuen =

Village in Hong Kong

Coordinates: 22.422955°N 114.036478°E

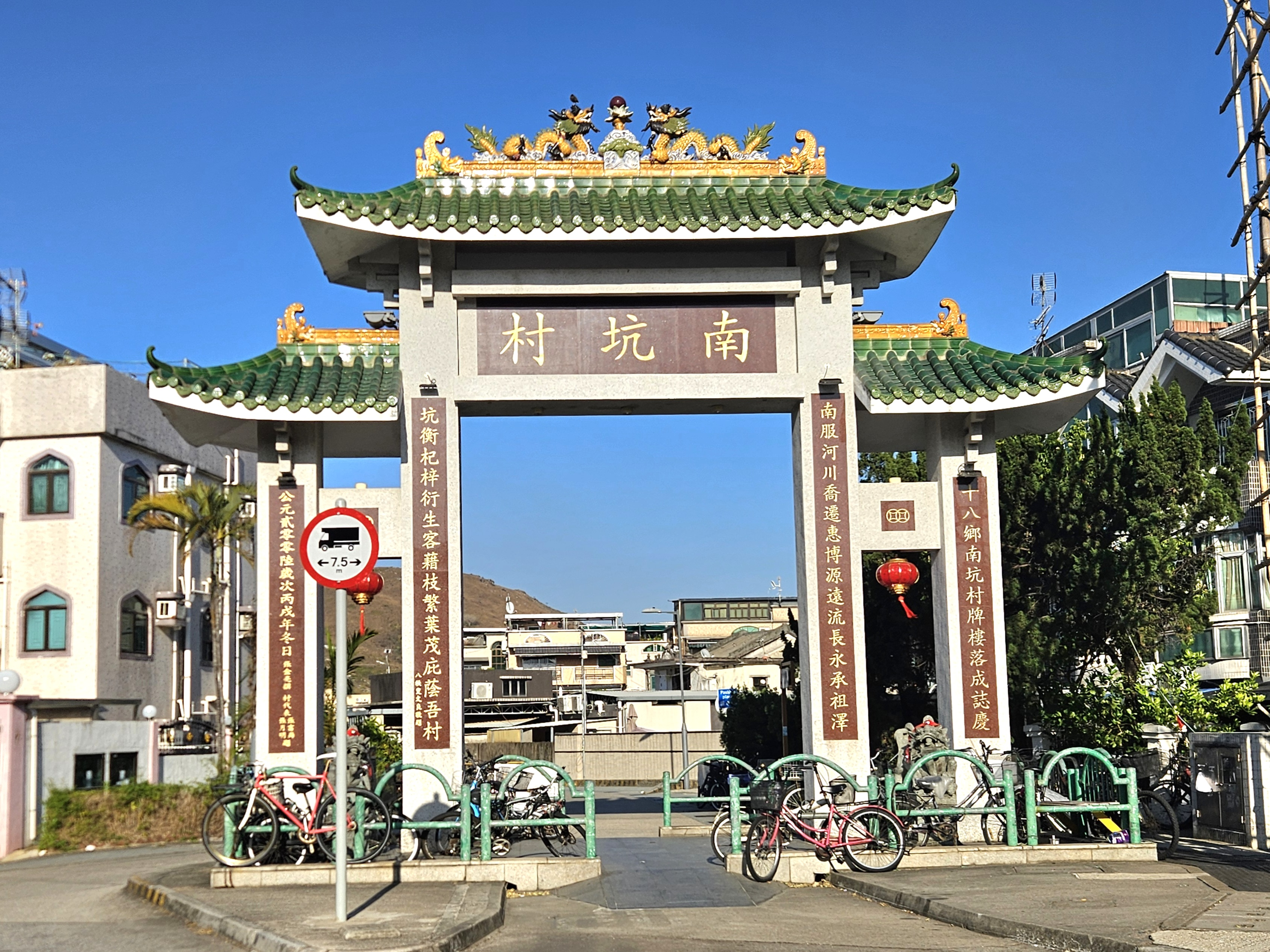
Paifang of Nam Hang Tsuen in March 2026.

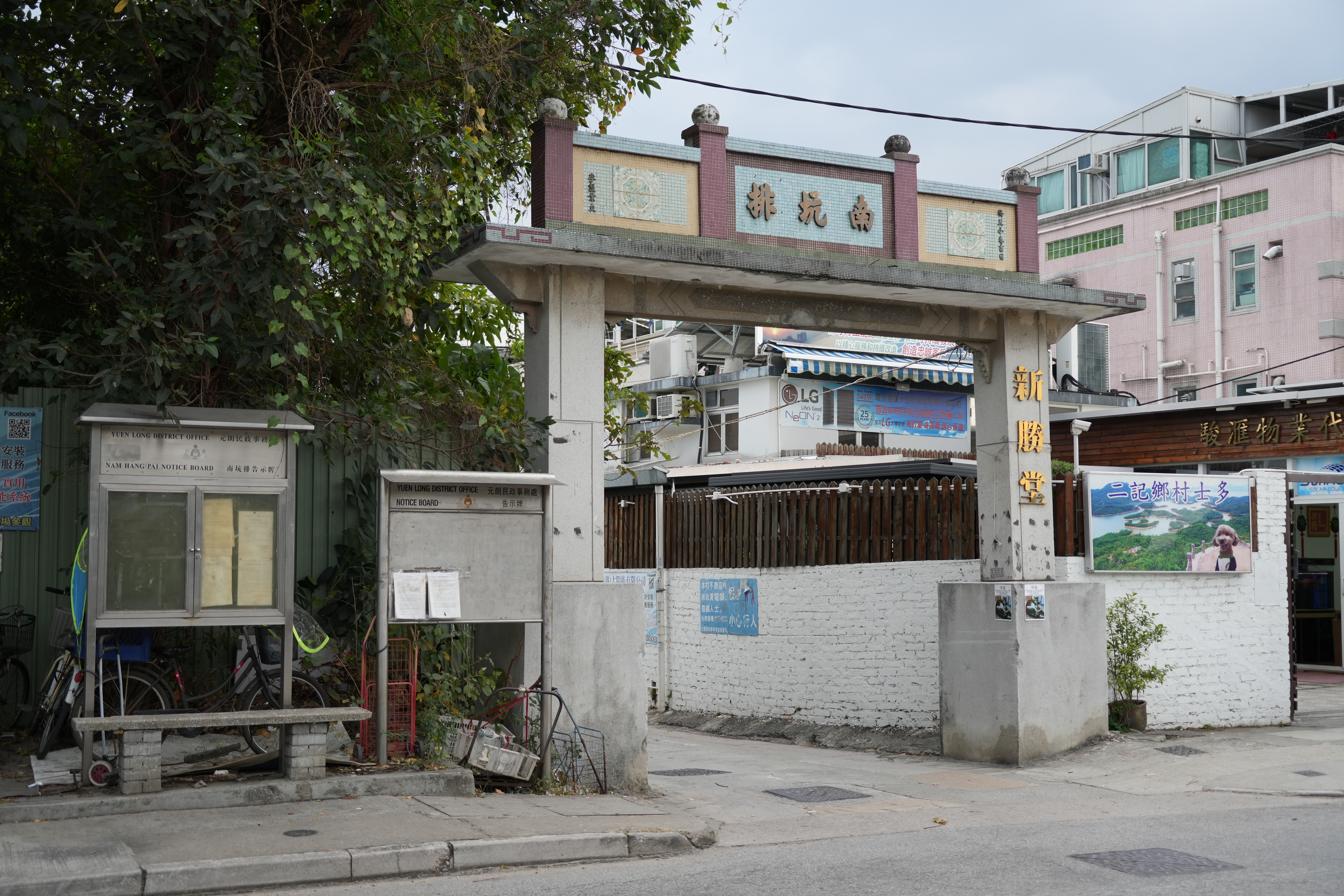
Paifang of Nam Hang Pai along Tai Tong Road.

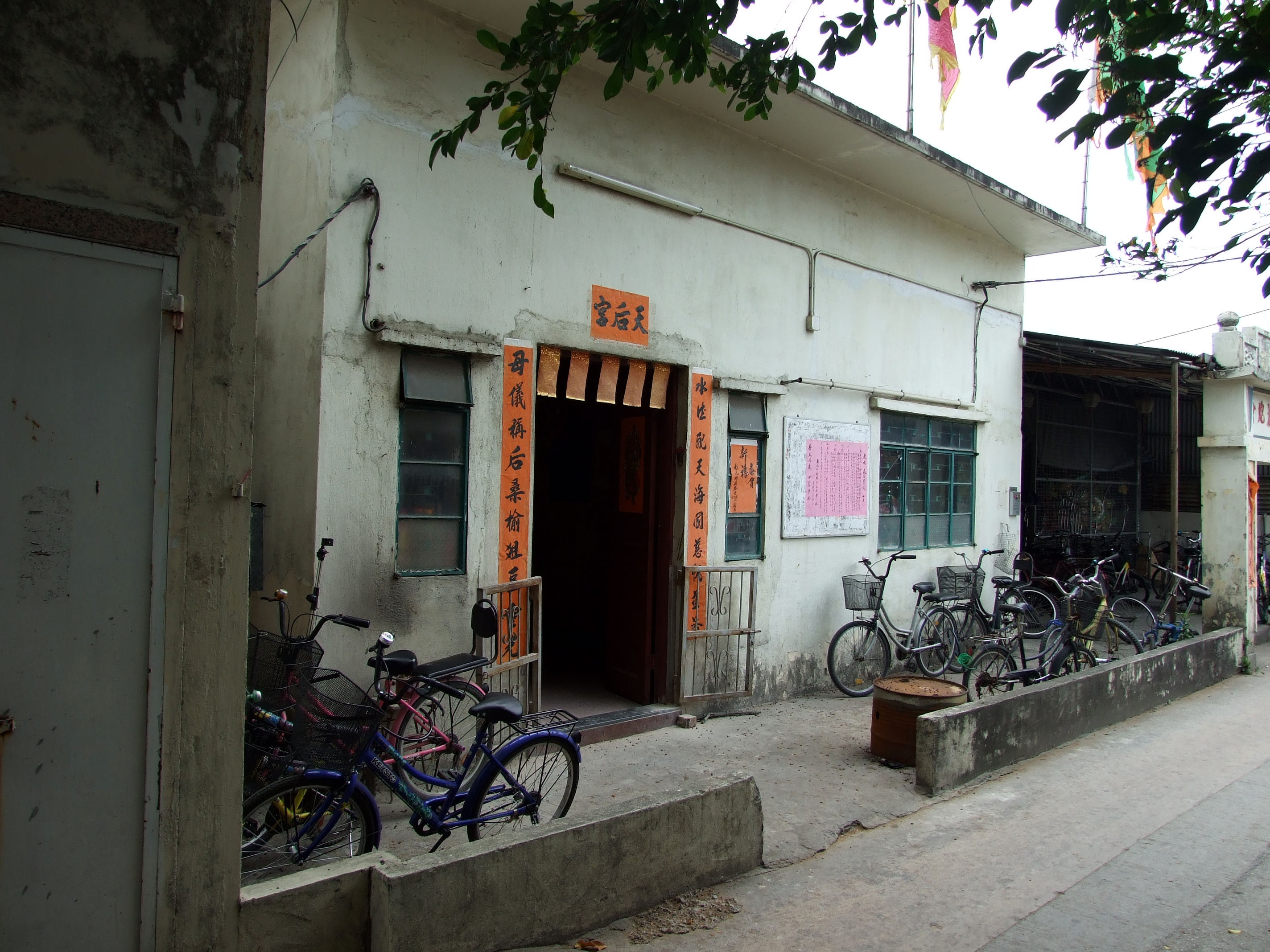
Tin Hau Temple in Nam Hang Pai, located along the located along the Yuen Tsuen Ancient Trail.

Nam Hang Tsuen (Chinese: 南坑村) is a village in the Shap Pat Heung area of Yuen Long District, Hong Kong.

The village of Nam Hang Pai (南坑排) is located directly to its west.

== Administration ==
Nam Hang Tsuen is a recognized village under the New Territories Small House Policy.

== History ==
At the time of the 1911 census, the population of Nam Hang was 104. The number of males was 44.

== Education ==
Nam Hang is in Primary One Admission (POA) School Net 74. Within the school net are multiple aided schools (operated independently but funded with government money) and one government school: Yuen Long Government Primary School (元朗官立小學).

== See also ==
- Yuen Tsuen Ancient Trail
