= Lin Fa Shan, Tsuen Wan =

Mountain in Tsuen Wan, Hong Kong

Coordinates: 22.398086°N 114.089372°E

Lin Fa Shan (Chinese: 蓮花山; lit. 'lotus flower hill') is mountain in Hong Kong. With a height of 1,896 ft (578 m) in Tsuen Wan District, it is situated within Tai Lam Country Park.

The former Lin Fa Shan Mine was located near Sheung Tong. Wolframite was mined there.

== See also ==
- List of mountains, peaks and hills in Hong Kong
- Mining in Hong Kong
