= Yuen Tsuen Ancient Trail =

Historic trail in Hong Kong

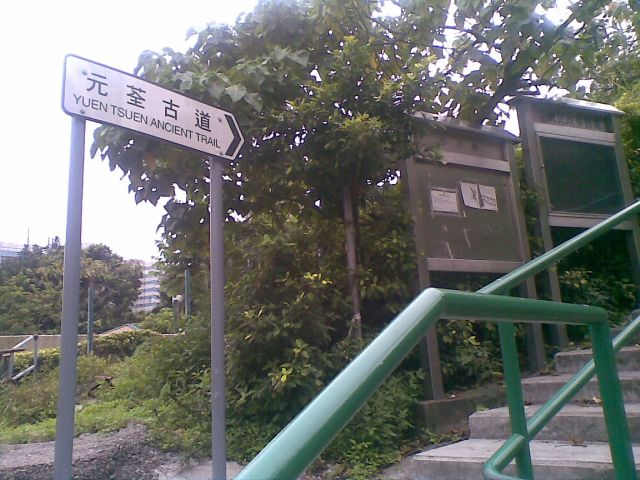
Yuen Tsuen Ancient Trail at Chai Wan Kok

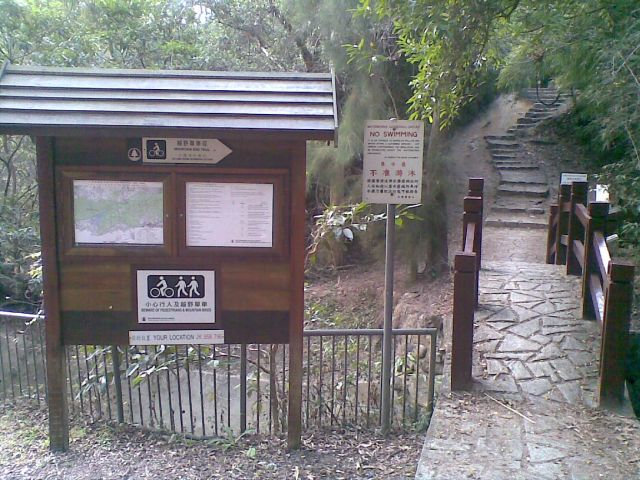
Yuen Tsuen Ancient Trail near Kat Hing Bridge, Tai Lam Chung

Yuen Tsuen Ancient Trail (Chinese: 元荃古道), also known as Yuen Tsuen Traditional Footpath, is a trail linking Yuen Long and Tsuen Wan in the New Territories of Hong Kong. The trail was the major trail for travelling between two major towns for villages trading their necessaries before the completion of Castle Peak Road.

== Map ==
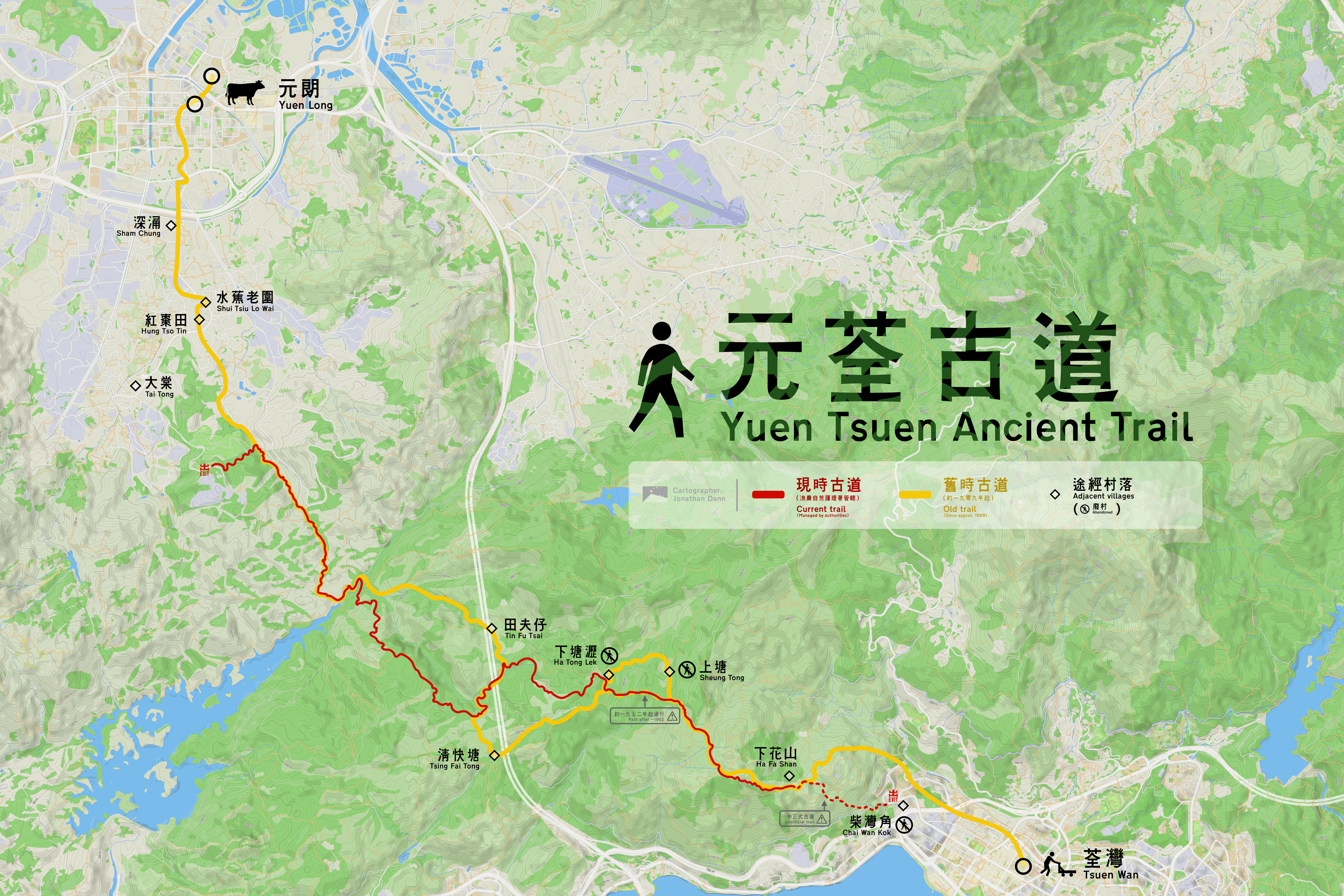
Yellow indicates the old Yuen Tsuen Ancient Trail as early as 1909, while the red indicates the current hiking path

The trail routes along Tsuen Wan, Tsuen King Circuit, Ha Fa Shan, Shek Lung Kung, Sheung Tong, Tin Fu Tsai, Tai Lam Chung, Nam Hang Pai and Yuen Long.

== Leisure ==
Part of the trail is designated as natural trail for hikers. Starting from Shek Lung Kung, it routes south to Sham Tseng instead of going to Yuen Long.

The starting of the stage 10 of MacLehose Trail meets the Yuen Tsuen Ancient Trail at Tin Fu Tsai, where a campsite is available for campers.
