= Harbin Z-9 =

Series of Chinese utility helicopters

Z-9
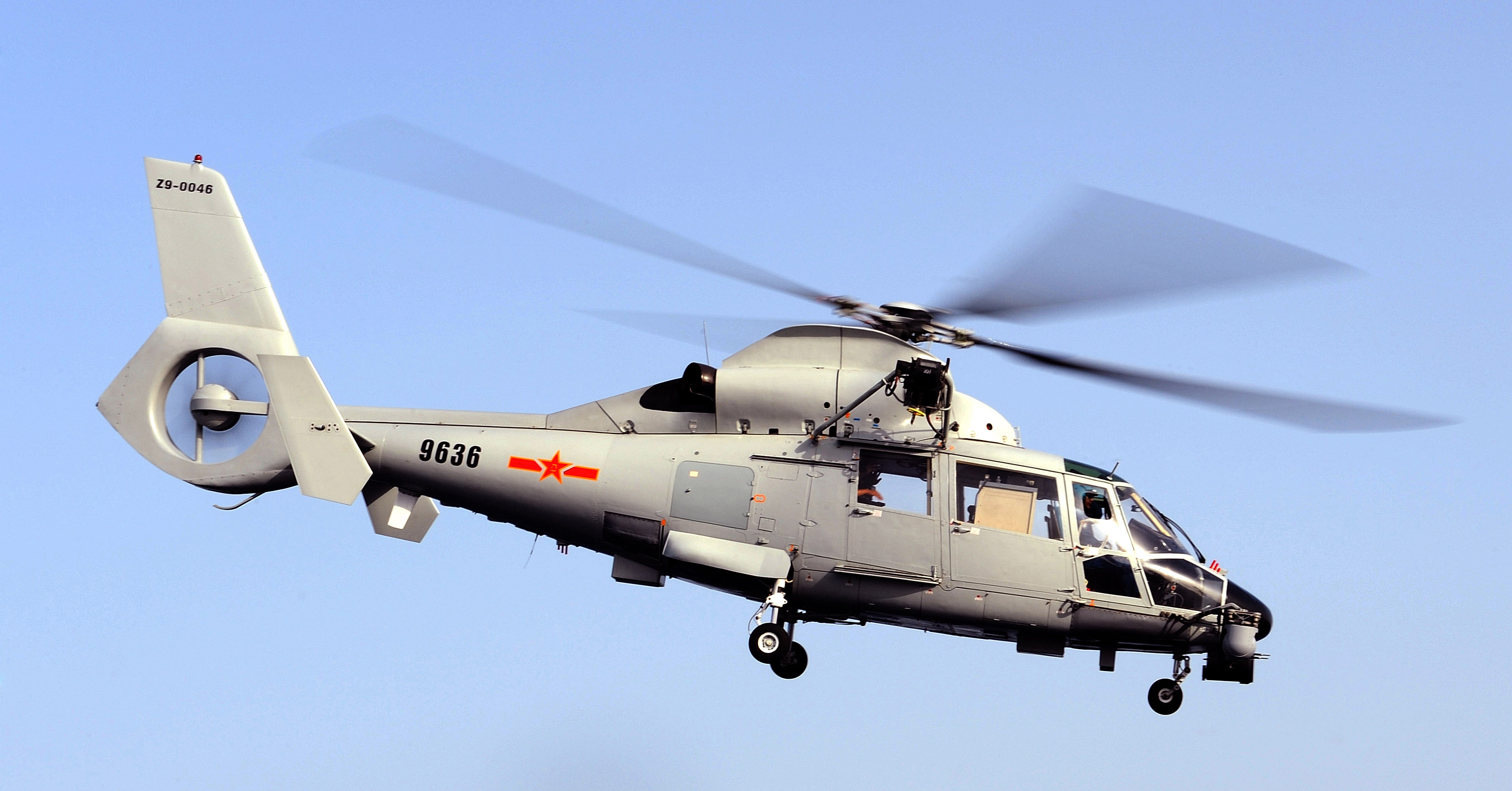
- A Chinese naval Z-9 departs HMS Cornwall

General information
- Type: Medium multi-purpose utility helicopter
- National origin: China
- Manufacturer: Harbin Aircraft Manufacturing Corporation
- Status: In service
- Primary users: People's Liberation Army Ground Force Pakistan Naval Air Arm
- Number built: 200+

History
- Manufactured: 1981–present
- Introduction date: 1994
- First flight: 1981
- Developed from: Eurocopter AS365 Dauphin
- Variant: Harbin Z-19

The Harbin Z-9 (NATO reporting name "Haitun", Chinese: 海豚; lit. 'Dolphin') is a Chinese military utility helicopter with armed variants, manufactured by Harbin Aircraft Manufacturing Corporation. It is a license-built variant of the French Eurocopter AS365 Dauphin.

== Design and development ==
The first Z-9 flew in 1981, and was built in China from components supplied by Aérospatiale as part of a production patent bought on 15 October 1980. On 16 January 1992, the indigenous variant Z-9B, constructed with 70% Chinese-made parts, flew successfully. The flight test was completed in November 1992 and the design was finalized a month later. Z-9B production began in 1993 and entered PLA service in 1994.

The Z-9B features an 11-blade Fenestron faired-in tail rotor with wider-chord, all-composite blades replacing the 13-blade used in the original AS365N. As a light tactical troop transport, the Z-9 has the capacity to transport 10 fully armed soldiers. Generally the Z-9 is identical to the AS365N Dauphin, though later variants of the Z-9 incorporate more composite materials to increase structural strength and lower radar signature.

The helicopter has a four-blade main rotor, with two turboshaft engines mounted side by side on top of the cabin with engine layout identical to the AS365N. The Z-9 teardrop-shaped body features a tapered boom to the tail fin, with rounded nose and stepped-up cockpit, retractable gear, and all flat bottom.

In 2002, Harbin obtained Chinese certification for the new H410A variant of the Z-9, which features more powerful Turbomeca Arriel 2C turboshaft engines; Eurocopter issued official objections to Harbin's decision to continue production in spite of the license-production agreement having expired, leading to a period of highly sensitive international negotiations to resolve the dispute.

== Variants ==
An armed variant has been fielded by the PLA since the early 1990s as the Z-9W, with pylons fitted for anti-tank missiles. These helicopters lack the maneuverability and survivability of a proper attack helicopter, and merely provide a stopgap during the development of the Z-10. The latest armed version, the Z-9W, was introduced in 2005 and has night attack capabilities, with an under-nose low-light TV and infra-red observing and tracking unit.

The naval version introduced in the 1990s is known as the Z-9C. As well as SAR and ASW duties, the Z-9C can be fitted with an X-band KLC-1 surface search radar to detect surface targets beyond the range of shipborne radar systems.

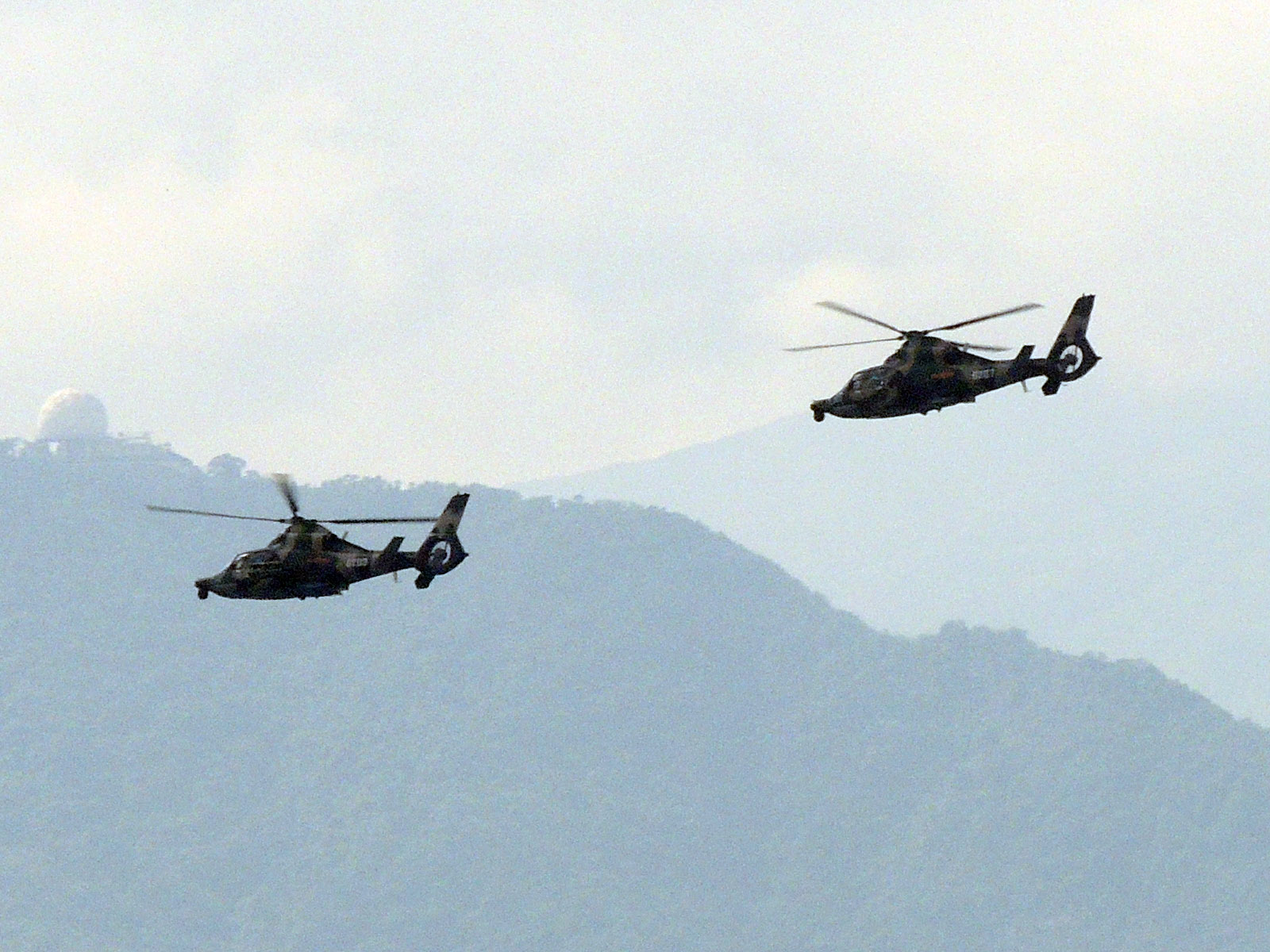
Harbin Z-9W

Z-9
License-produced variant of the French AS.365N1.

Z-9A
Kit-built variant of the AS.365N2.

Z-9A-100
Prototypes for domestic market versions with WZ8A engines. First flight 16 January 1992, approved 30 December 1992.

Z-9B
Production version based on Z-9A-100. Multi-role.

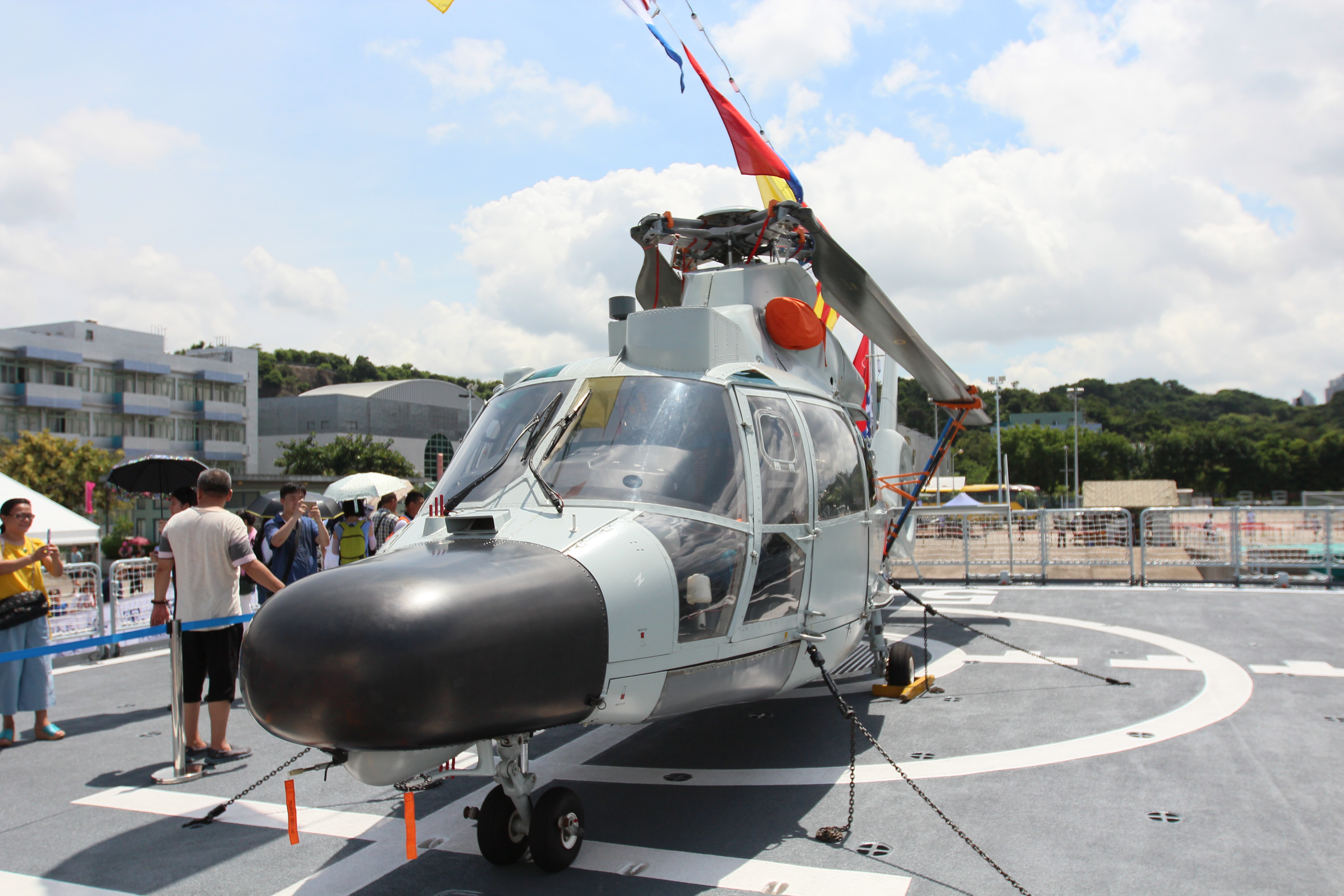
A PLAN Z-9C helicopter

Z-9C
License-produced variant of the Eurocopter AS.565 Panther for the PLA Naval Air Force.4

Z-9D
Naval helicopter.

Z-9EC
ASW variant produced for the Pakistan Naval Air Arm. Configured with pulse-compression radar, low frequency dipping sonar, radar warning receiver and doppler navigation system, it is also armed with torpedoes for use aboard Pakistan Navy's Zulfiquar-class frigates.

Z-9G
Export version of the WZ-9 gunship.

Z-9EH
Transport, emergency and/or passenger variant.

Z-9W
Also known as WZ-9. Armed version with optional pylon-mounted armament, gyro stabilization and roof-mounted optical sight. Export designation Z-9G, roof-mounted sight optional. First flown in 1987, with the first weapons tests in 1989.

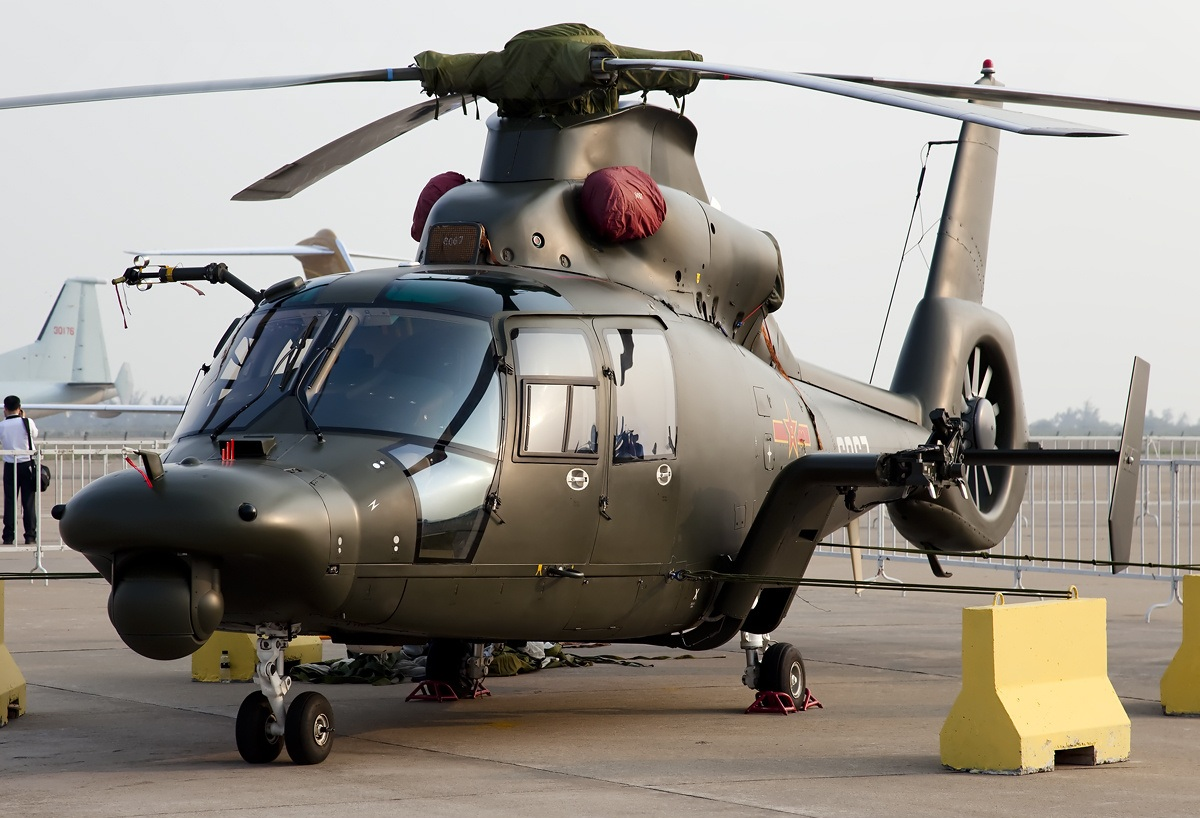
A Harbin Z-9WA

Z-9WA
A newer night-capable version has been built with nose-mounted FLIR. July 2011, Xinhua News Agency released a photo of Z-9WA firing AKD10 air-to-ground missile. Incorporates a domestic Chinese helmet mounted sight that is compatible with anti-tank missiles such as HJ-8 /9/ 10, as well as light anti-ship missiles such as C-701/703 and TL-1/ 10 when they are used as air-to-surface missiles, air-to-air missiles such as TY-90 and other MANPAD missiles for self-defense.

Z-9Z
Prototype reconnaissance version.

H410A
Version with 635 kW WZ8C turbo-shaft engines. First flight September 2001, CAAC certification 10 July 2002. One is currently being fitted with a new Mast-Mounted Sighting (MMS) system.

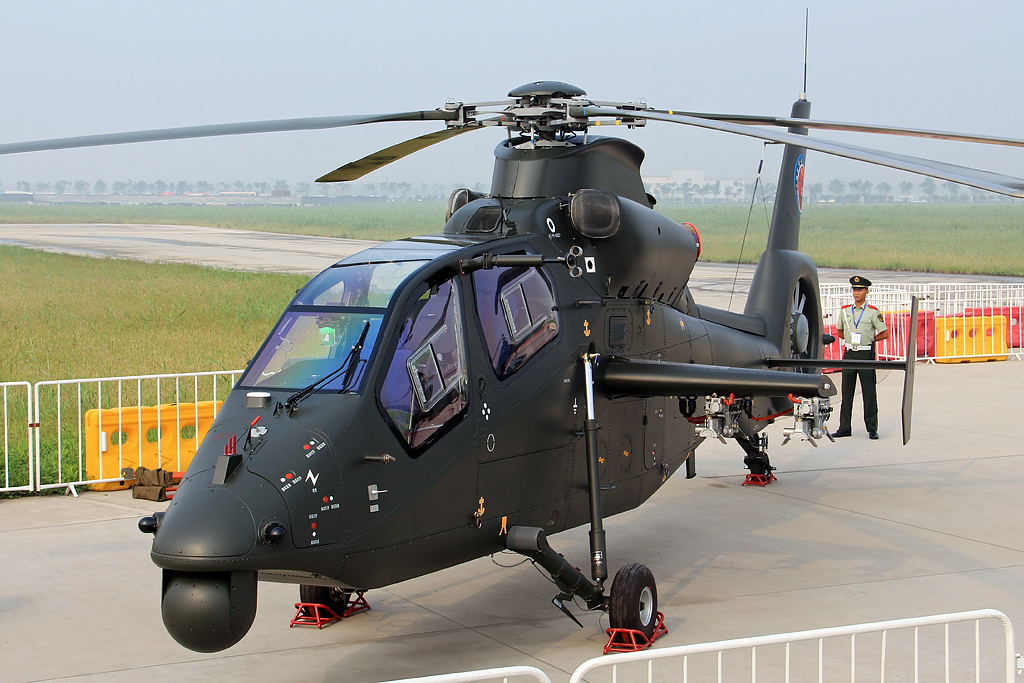
A Harbin Z-19 at the China Helicopter Exposition, Tianjin 2013

H425
Newest VIP version of the H410A.

H450
Projected development.

Z-19
Attack helicopter development with tandem seats. The Z-19 shares the same powerplant as the Z-9WA.

== Operators ==
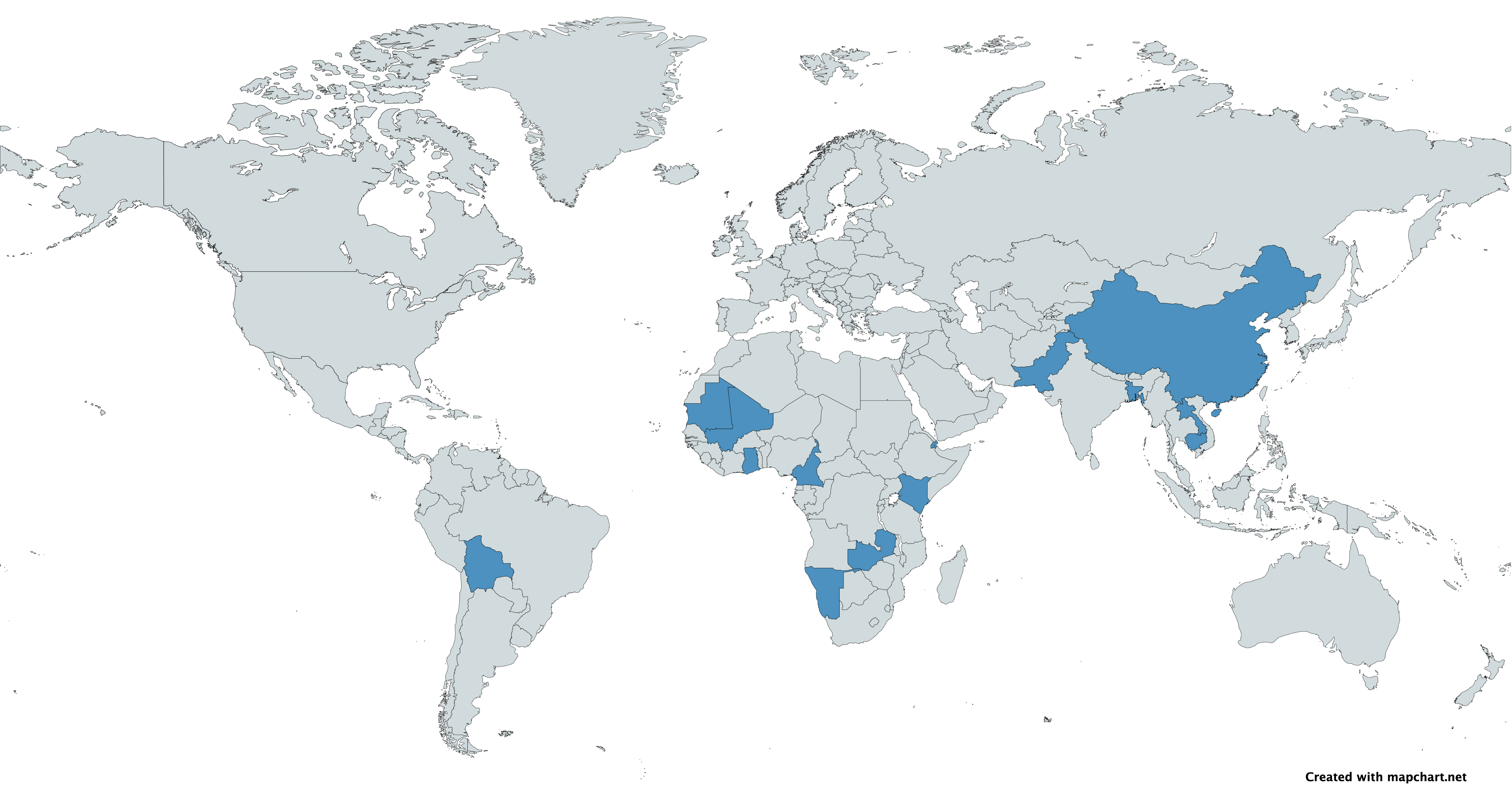
A map with users of the Harbin Z-9 in blue

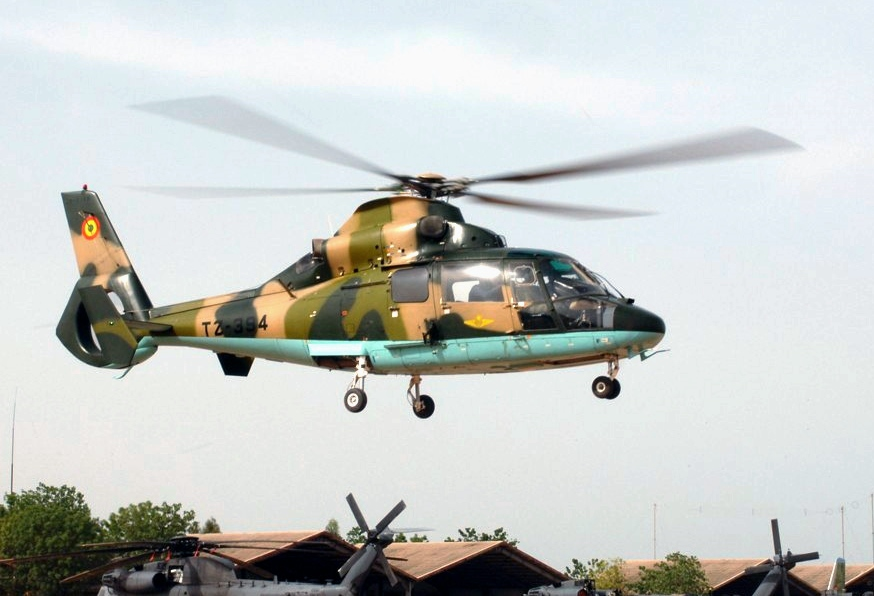
A Malian Air Force Z-9B coming in to land

Bolivia

- Bolivian Army

Cambodia

- Cambodian Air Force
- Cambodian Gendarmerie

Cameroon

- Cameroon Air Force

China

- People's Liberation Army Air Force
- People's Liberation Army Ground Air Force
- People's Liberation Army Naval Air Force
  - Type 052D destroyer
  - Type 053 frigate, Type 053H3 frigate, Type 054 frigate, Type 054A frigate (Z-9C)
  - Type 056 corvette (Z-9C)
- People's Armed Police
- Guizhou Public Security Department

Djibouti

- Djiboutian Air Force

Equatorial Guinea

- Armed Forces of Equatorial Guinea

Ghana

- Ghana Air Force

Kenya

- Kenya Defence Forces

Laos

- Laotian Air Force

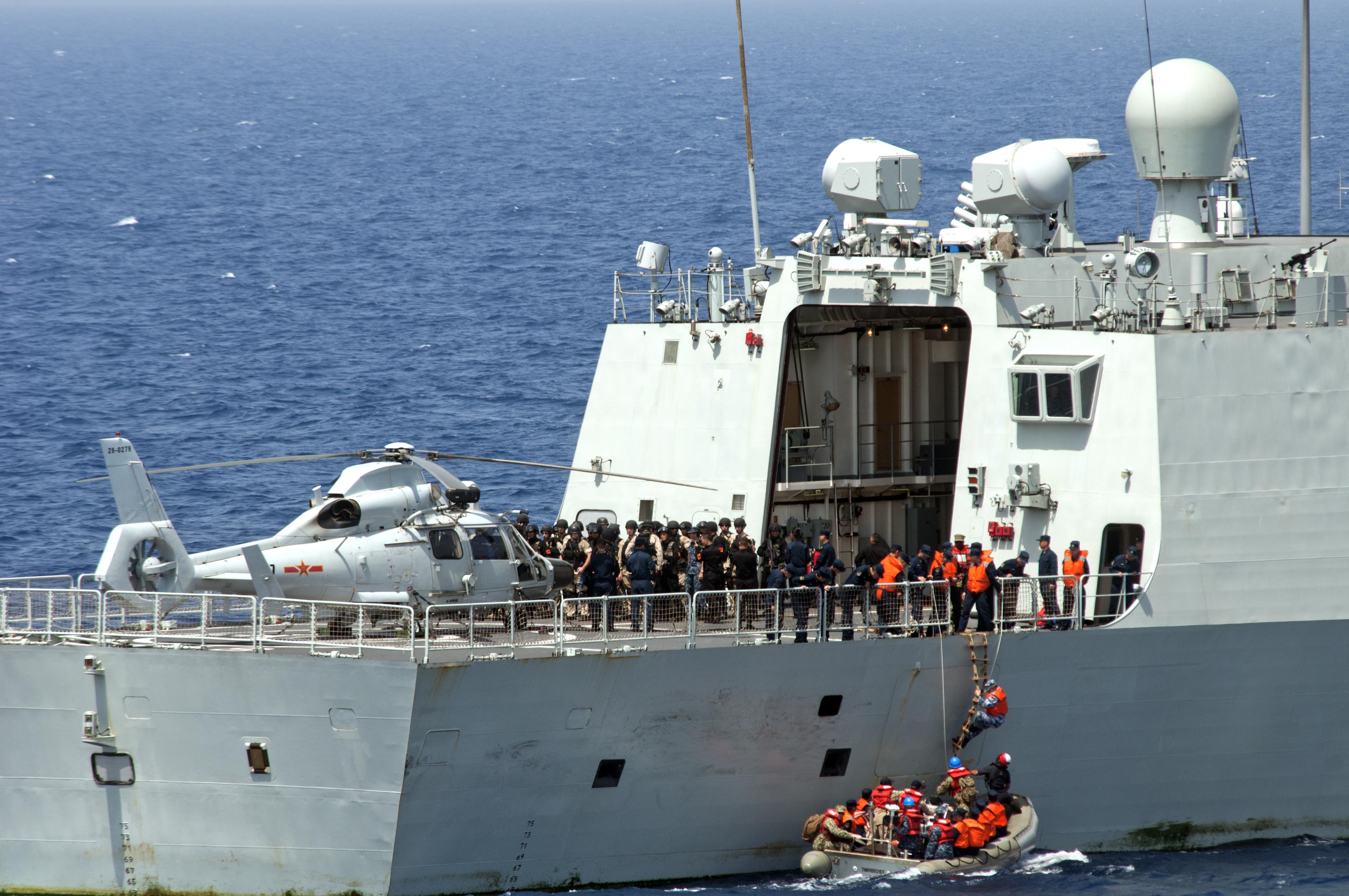
A Z-9 aboard the aft-deck of Type 054A frigate Yiyang during a bilateral counter-piracy exercise between China and the US in 2012

Mali

- Mali Air Force

Mauritania

- Mauritanian Air Force

Myanmar

- State Administration Council

Namibia

- Namibian Air Force

Pakistan

- Pakistan Naval Air Arm
  - Tughril-class frigate: Z-9D
  - Zulfiqar-class frigate: Z-9EC

Zambia

- Zambian Air Force

== Accidents and incidents ==
- On 11 April 2014: A Harbin Z-9 Helicopter operated by the Namibian Air Force crashed during takeoff at Grootfontein Air Force Base.
- 2020 Hong Kong Garrison helicopter crash
- On 6 August 2025, a Z-9 operated by the Ghana Air Force crashed in Ashanti Region in Ghana, killing all eight people on board including defence minister Edward Omane Boamah and environment minister Ibrahim Murtala Muhammed.
- On 19 June 2026, a Z-9 of the Armed Forces of Equatorial Guinea crahed into a mountain range located between the cities of Niefang and Evinayong. The four occupants on board died in the accident.

== Specifications (Z-9B) ==

Data from

General characteristics

- Crew: 1 or 2 pilots
- Capacity: 10 passengers or 1,900 kg (4,189 lb) payload internal, 1,600 kg (3,527 lb) payload slung
- Length: 12.11 m (39 ft 9 in)
- Height: 4.01 m (13 ft 2 in)
- Empty weight: 2,050 kg (4,519 lb)
- Max takeoff weight: 4,100 kg (9,039 lb)
- Powerplant: 2 × Zhuzhou Aeroengine Factory WZ-8A turboshaft, 632 kW (848 hp) each
- Main rotor diameter: 11.94 m (39 ft 2 in)
- Main rotor area: 111.98 m^{2} (1,205.3 sq ft) swept area

Performance

- Maximum speed: 305 km/h (190 mph, 165 kn)
- Cruise speed: 260 km/h (160 mph, 140 kn)
- Ferry range: 1,000 km (620 mi, 540 nmi) with internal auxiliary tank
- Endurance: 5 hours
- Service ceiling: 4,500 m (14,800 ft)
  Hovering ceiling in ground effect: 2,600 m (8,500 ft)
  Hovering ceiling out of ground effect: 1,600 m (5,200 ft)

Armament

- Guns: two fixed 23 mm Type 23-2 (AM-23) cannon on attack variants.
- Hardpoints: Pylons for rockets, gun pods, ET52 torpedo, HJ-8 anti-tank missiles, or TY-90 air-to-air missiles.

== See also ==
Related development

- Eurocopter AS365 Dauphin
- Eurocopter Panther
- Harbin Z-19

Aircraft of comparable role, configuration, and era

- Agusta A109
- AgustaWestland AW139
- Bell Huey family
- Bell 222/230/430
- Eurocopter HH-65 Dolphin
- HAL Dhruv
- Sikorsky SH-60 Seahawk
- Sikorsky S-76
- TAI T625

Related lists

- List of utility helicopters
