= Tsing Fai Tong =

Village of Hong Kong

Coordinates: 22.381642°N 114.062206°E

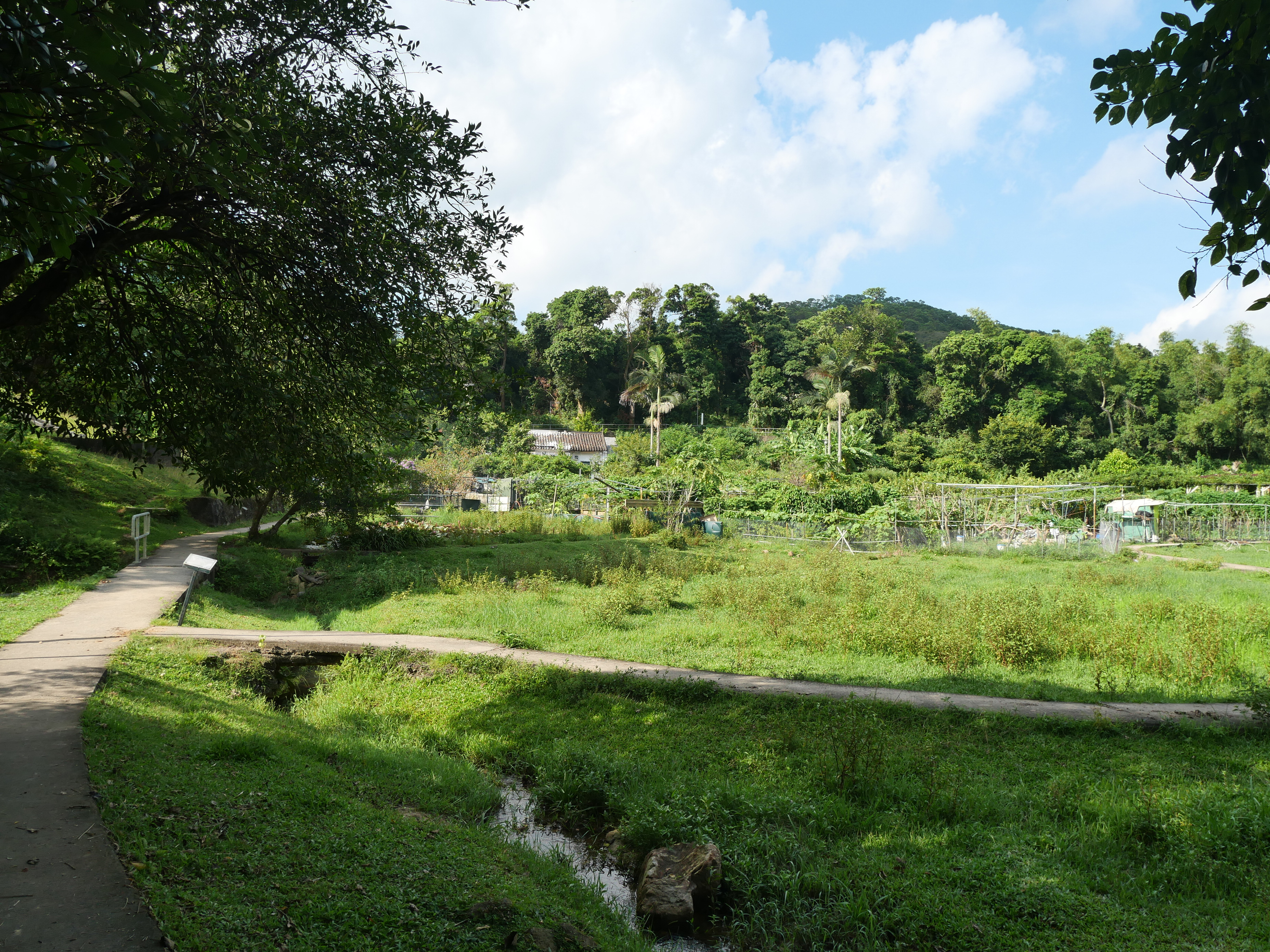
Tsing Fai Tong in August 2020.

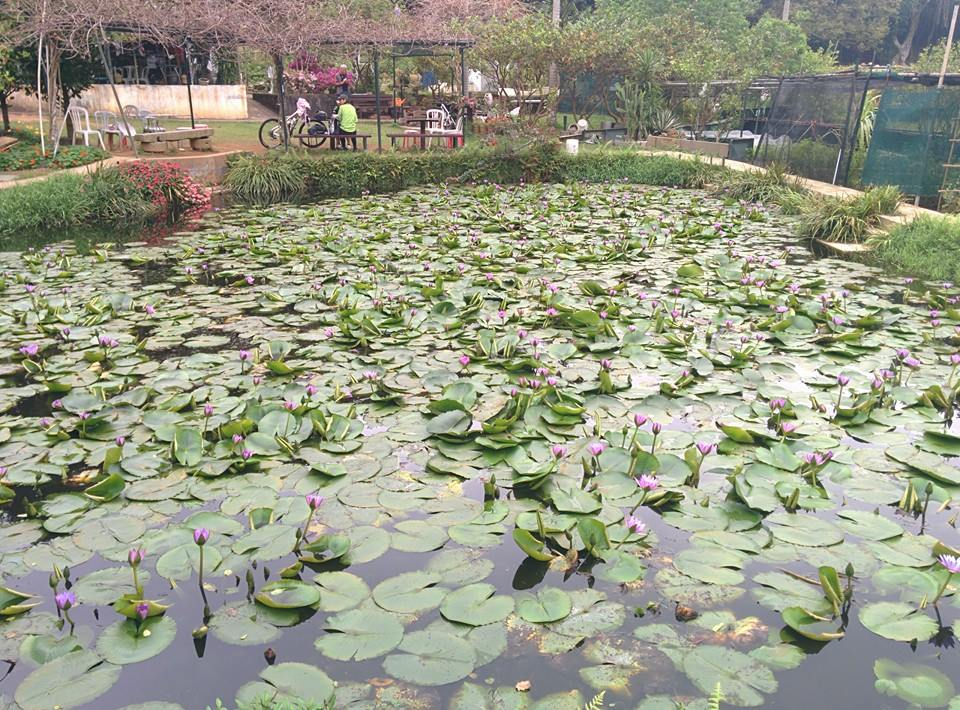
Lotus pool in Tsing Fai Tong.

Tsing Fai Tong (Chinese: 清快塘) is a village in Tsuen Wan District, Hong Kong.

== Administration ==
Tsing Fai Tong is a recognized village under the New Territories Small House Policy.

== See also ==
- Tin Fu Tsai
