= Ha Fa Shan =

Coordinates: 22.383107°N 114.095245°E

Ha Fa Shan (Chinese: 下花山) is a village in Tsuen Wan District, Hong Kong.

== Access ==
Ha Fa Shan is located along the Yuen Tsuen Ancient Trail.
