= Ta Chuen Ping =

Coordinates: 22.373921°N 114.133169°E

Ta Chuen Ping or Da Chuen Ping (Chinese: 打磚坪村) is a village in the Tsuen Wan District of Hong Kong.

== Administration ==
Ta Chuen Ping is a recognized village under the New Territories Small House Policy.
