= Chuen Lung =

Place in Tai Mo Shan, Tsuen Wan District, Hong Kong

Coordinates: 22.39297°N 114.1115°E

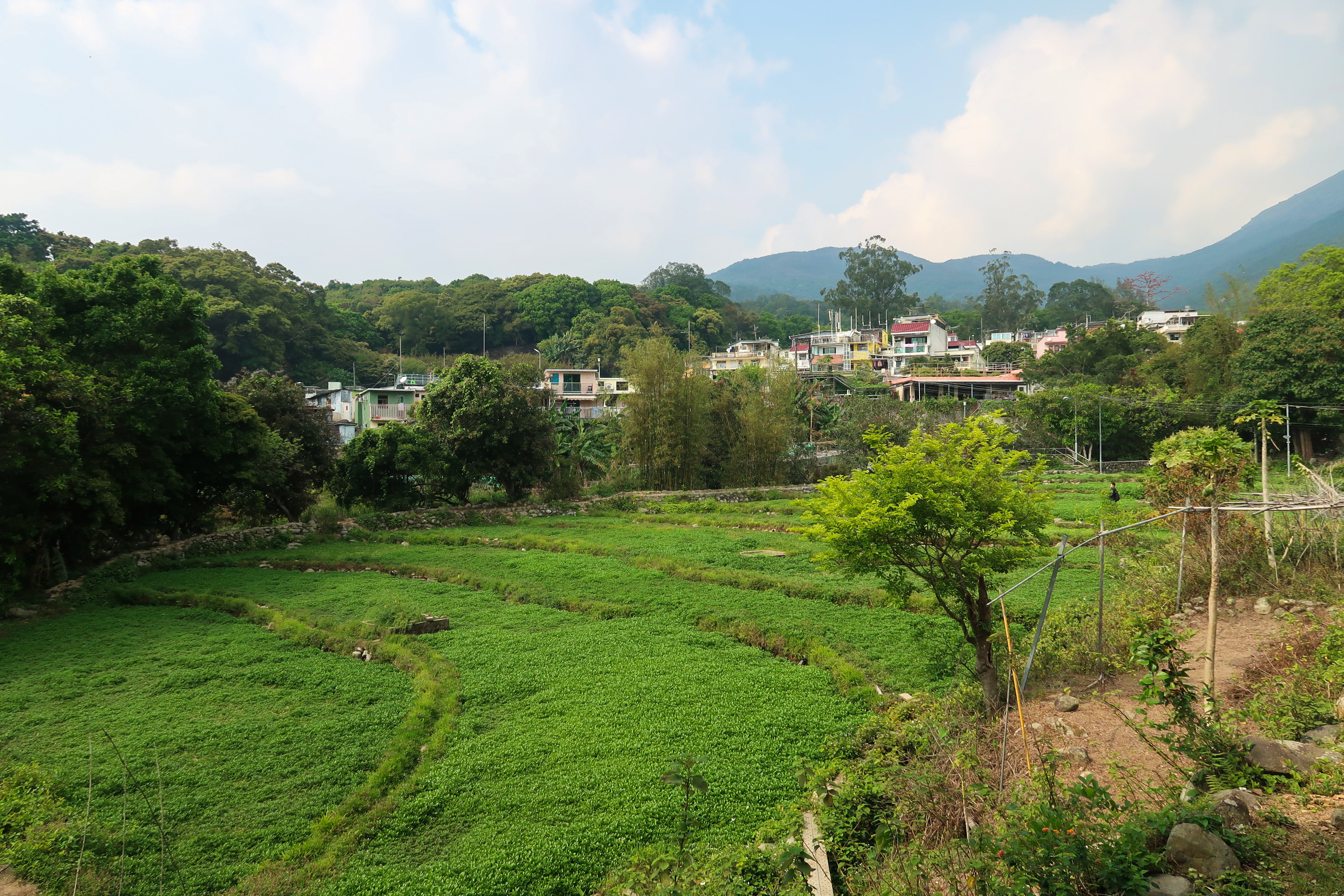
Chuen Lung

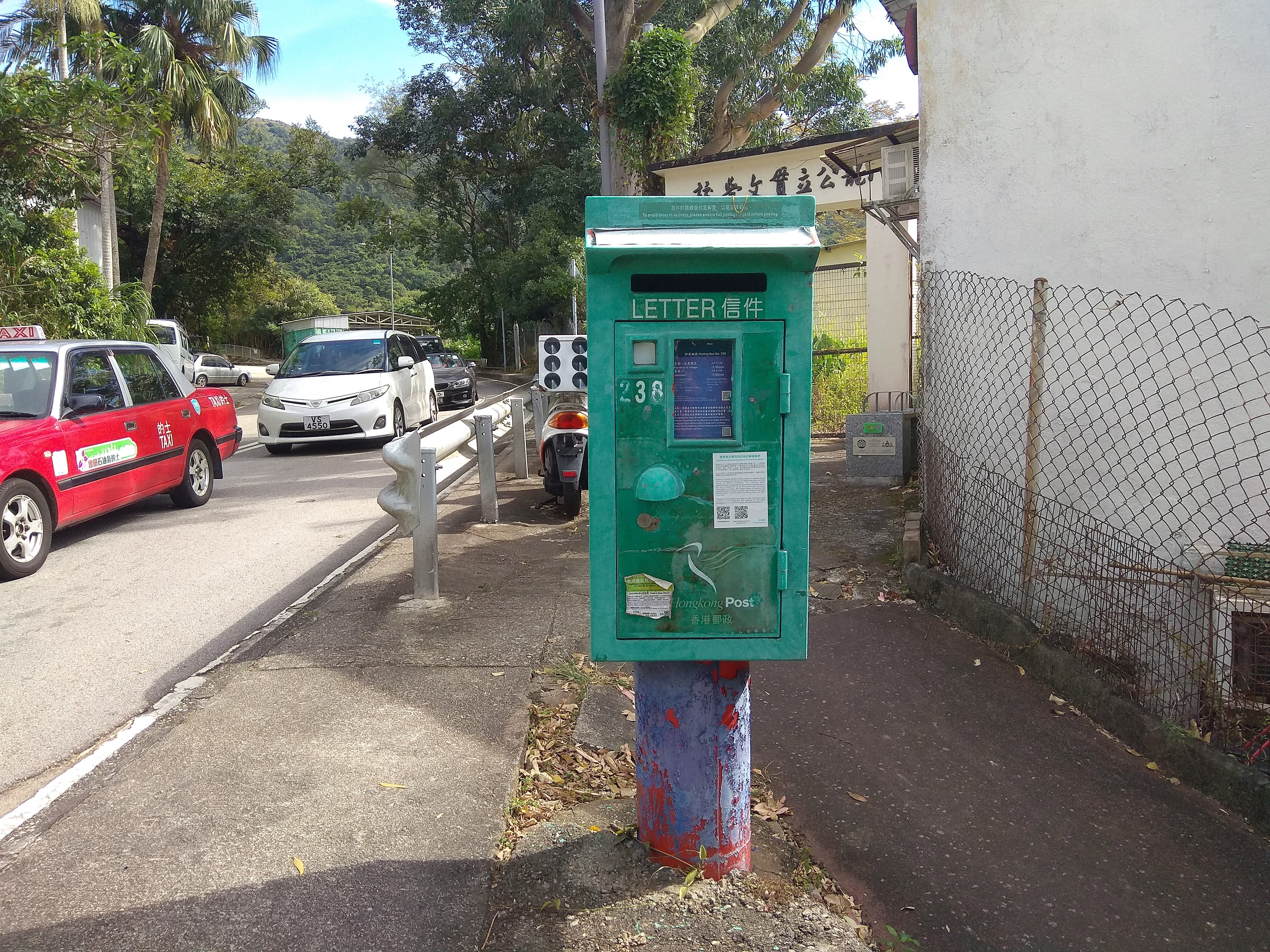
Route Twisk

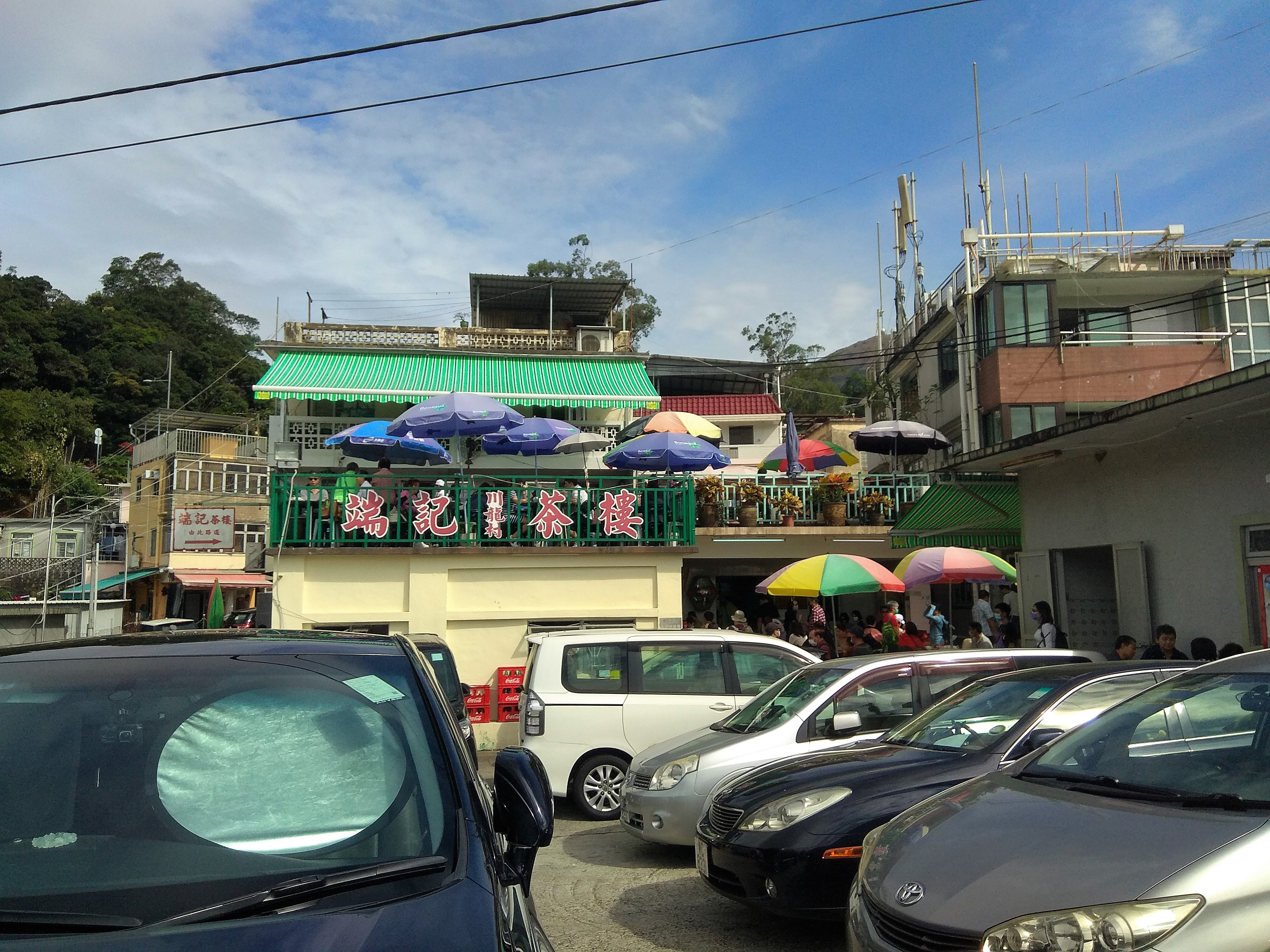
Duen Kee Chinese Restaurant, a dim sum restaurant in Chuen Lung

Chuen Lung (Chinese: 川龍) is a place in Tai Mo Shan, Tsuen Wan District, Hong Kong. The name comes from the local Hakka village Chuen Lung Village (Chinese: 川龍村).

== History ==
Located on the hillside of Tai Mo Shan, Chuen Lung Village is one of the oldest Hakka villages in the area. The village is mainly inhabited by the Tsang Clan (Chinese: 曾氏), the indigenous inhabitants of the New Territories, whose ancestry is from Longchuan County in Guangdong Province (west of Wuhua County today), and who migrated southwards to settle in the Tsuen Wan District (including Ta Chuen Ping) .

It is said to have been founded by Tsang Tai-cheung (曾大璋) during the Zhengtong period (1436–1449) of the Ming dynasty. Tsang Tai-cheung had moved, together with his two brothers, from Huizhou to Muk Min Ha Tsuen (木棉下村) in today's Tsuen Wan area, during the Yongle period (1403–1424). He then moved to Chuen Lung several decades later. It is rumored that the village move to the hillside of Tai Mo Shan to avoid pirates.

In the late 17th and early 20th centuries, as Hong Kong's latitude was similar to that of Yunnan, where tea is produced, and the climate of the high mountains was suitable for the cultivation of Camellia sinensis, large-scale commercially grown tea plantations were found in Plover Cove and the area around Shing Mun, Tai Mo Shan. The historian David Faure estimated that villagers in Chuen Lung used to make a living by growing tea in the early years, but the tea plantations were deserted after the 1920s.

In the post-war 1950s, the British Hong Kong Government banned the planting of watercress in urban areas such as Mongkok to prevent the spread of malaria. Some newly settled villagers in Chuen Lung tried to grow watercress in the area. Owing to the location of Chuan Lung, which has abundant water supply and favourable temperature on the hill, quality watercress started to be grown successfully in the 1960s. Nowadays, there are still a few villagers growing watercress in Chuan Lung. Around November after the Mid-Autumn Festival, watercress is harvested, attracting many diners to try the local fresh watercress. Compared with other New Territories vegetable species that have been lost, Chuan Lung's watercress has been preserved. However, according to the farmers, there is no one to continue the tradition and it is difficult to sustain it, so it is in danger of being lost.

== Features ==
The Tsang Ancestral Hall in Chuen Lung is believed to have been built in around the 17th century. It is listed as a Grade III historic building.

== Administration ==
Chuen Lung Village is a recognized village under the New Territories Small House Policy.
