= Yeung Uk Tsuen, Wang Chau =

Village in Yuen Long District, Hong Kong

Coordinates: 22.452508°N 114.026483°E

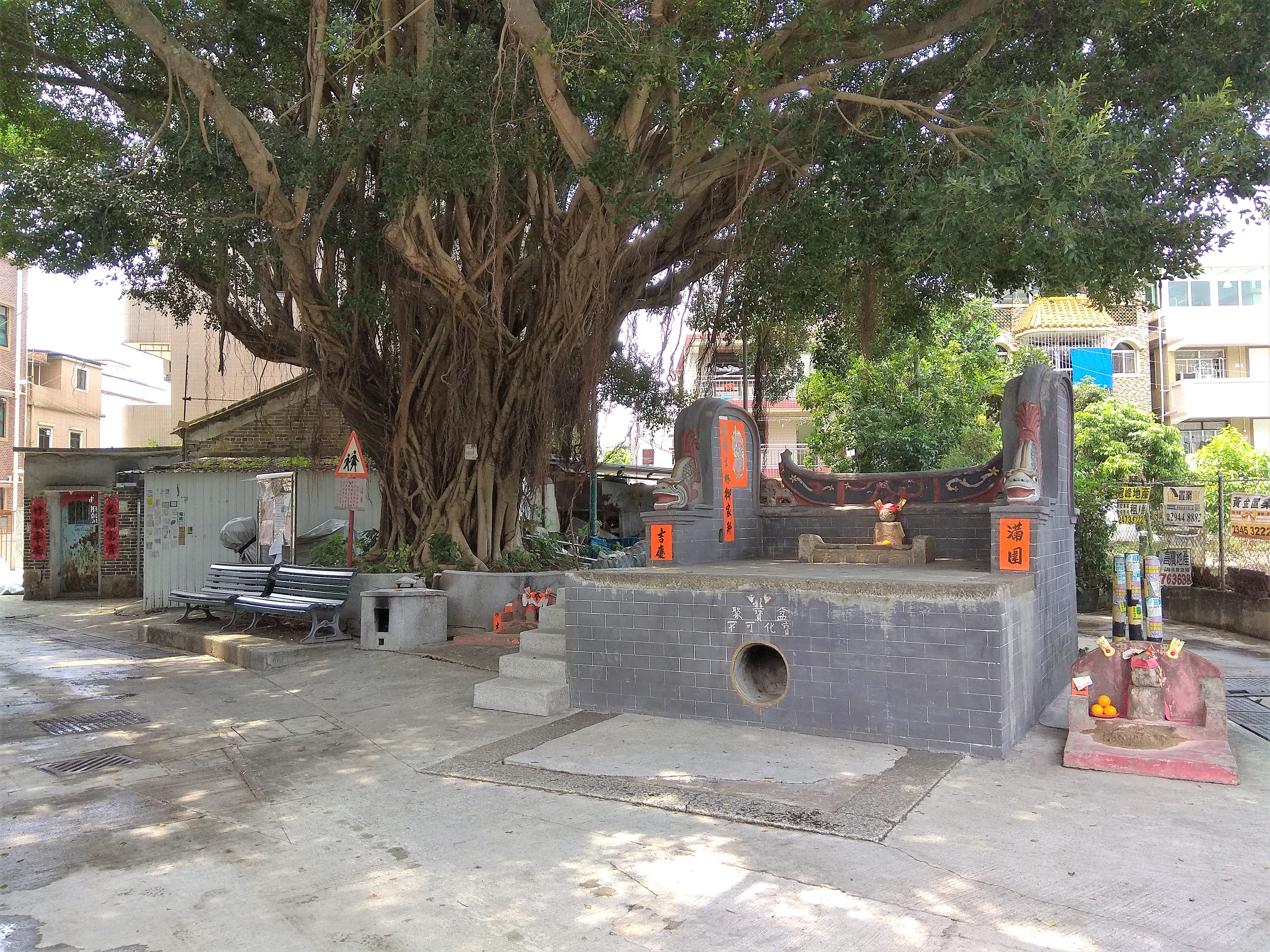
Shrines in Yeung Uk Tsuen.

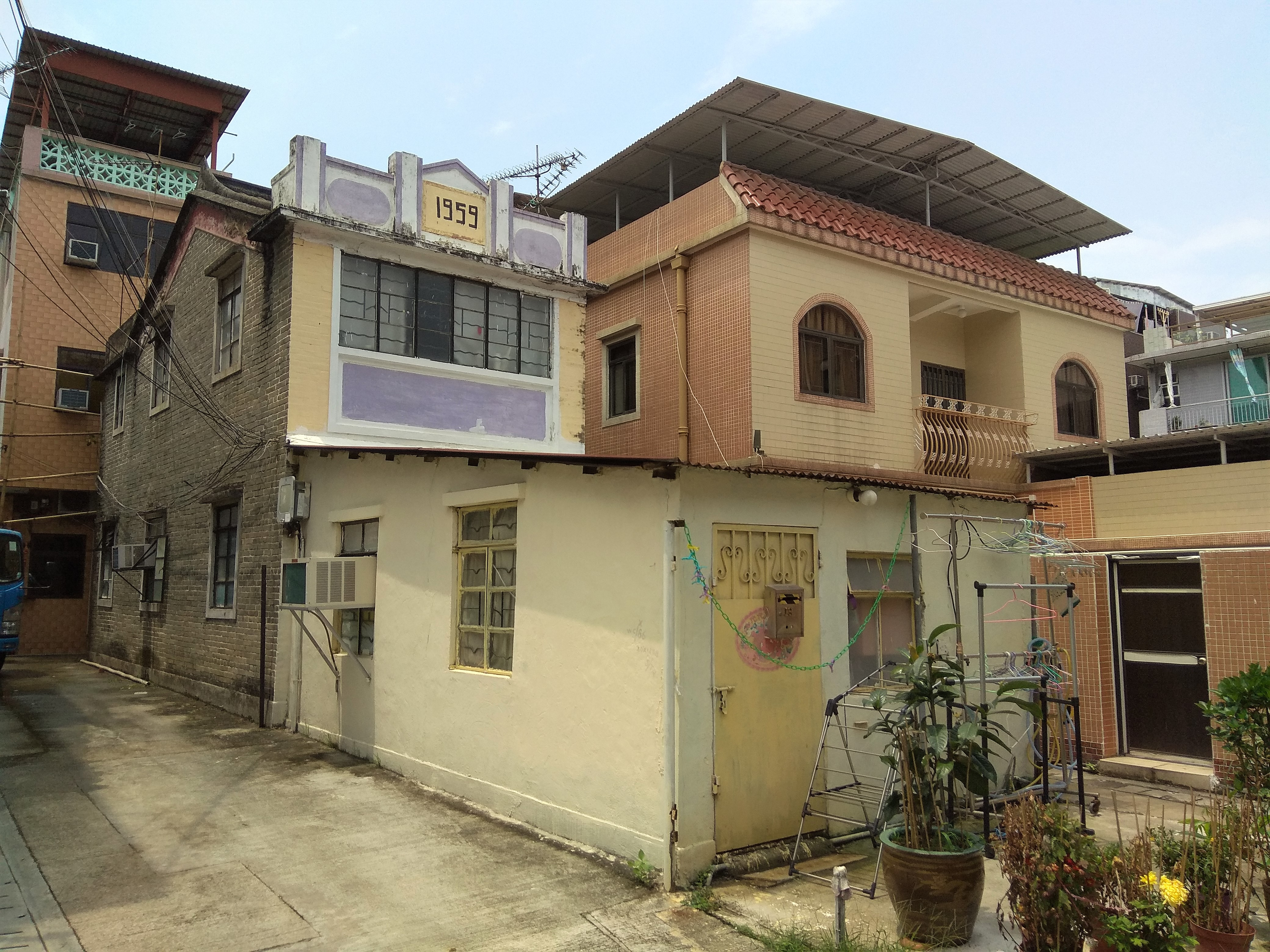
Houses in Yeung Uk Tsuen.

Yeung Uk Tsuen (Chinese: 楊屋村) is a village in Wang Chau, Yuen Long District, Hong Kong.

== Administration ==
Yeung Uk Tsuen is a recognized village under the New Territories Small House Policy. It is one of the 37 villages represented within the Ping Shan Rural Committee. For electoral purposes, Yeung Uk Tsuen is part of the Ping Shan North constituency.

== History ==
The nearby I Shing Temple was built in 1718 by the residents of six villages of Wang Chau: Sai Tau Wai, Tung Tau Wai, Lam Uk Tsuen, Chung Sum Wai, Fuk Hing Tsuen and Yeung Uk Tsuen.
