= Che Kung Temple =

Group of temples in Hong Kong

Coordinates: 22.3735°N 114.1829°E

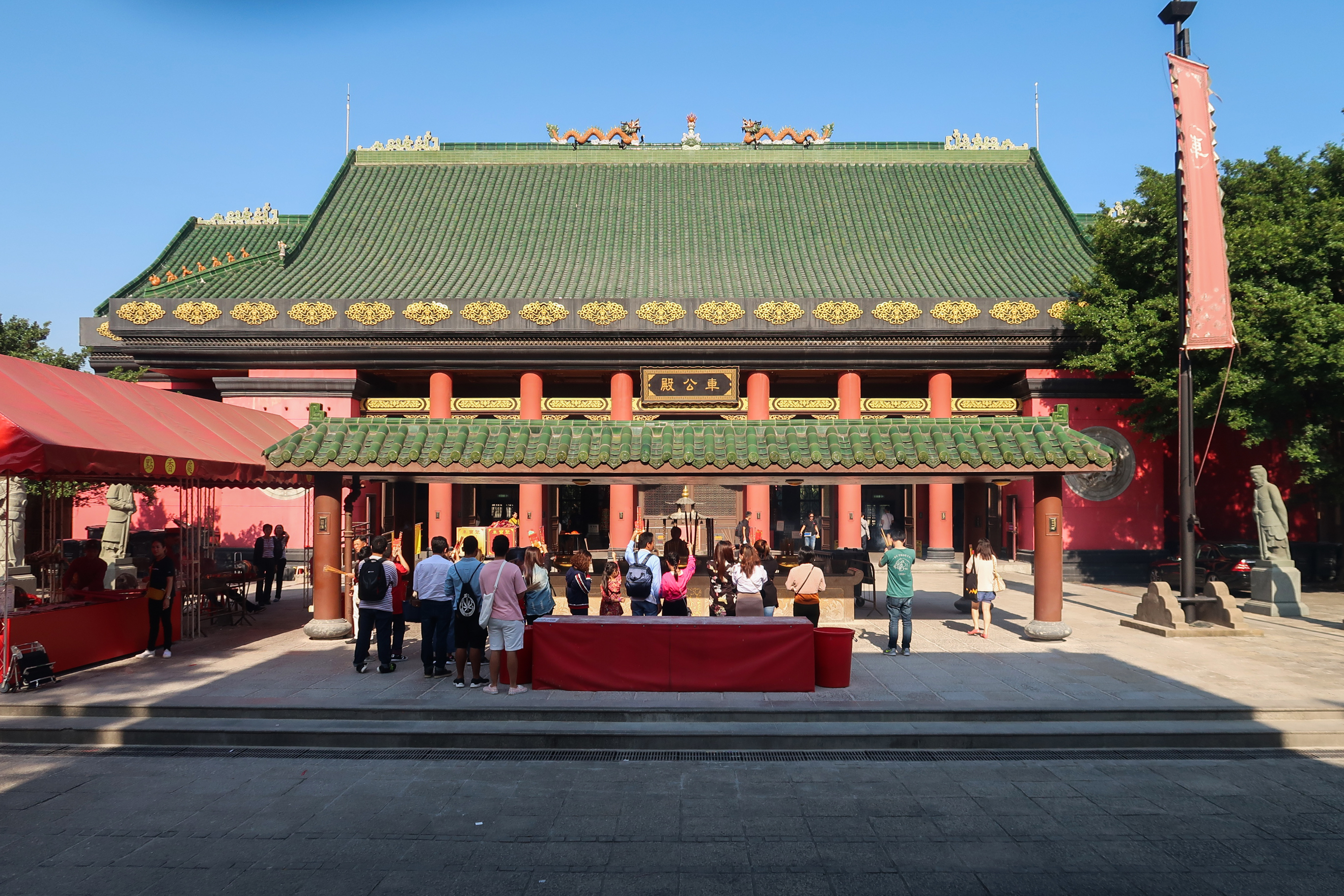
Courtyard of Che Kung Temple in Tai Wai.

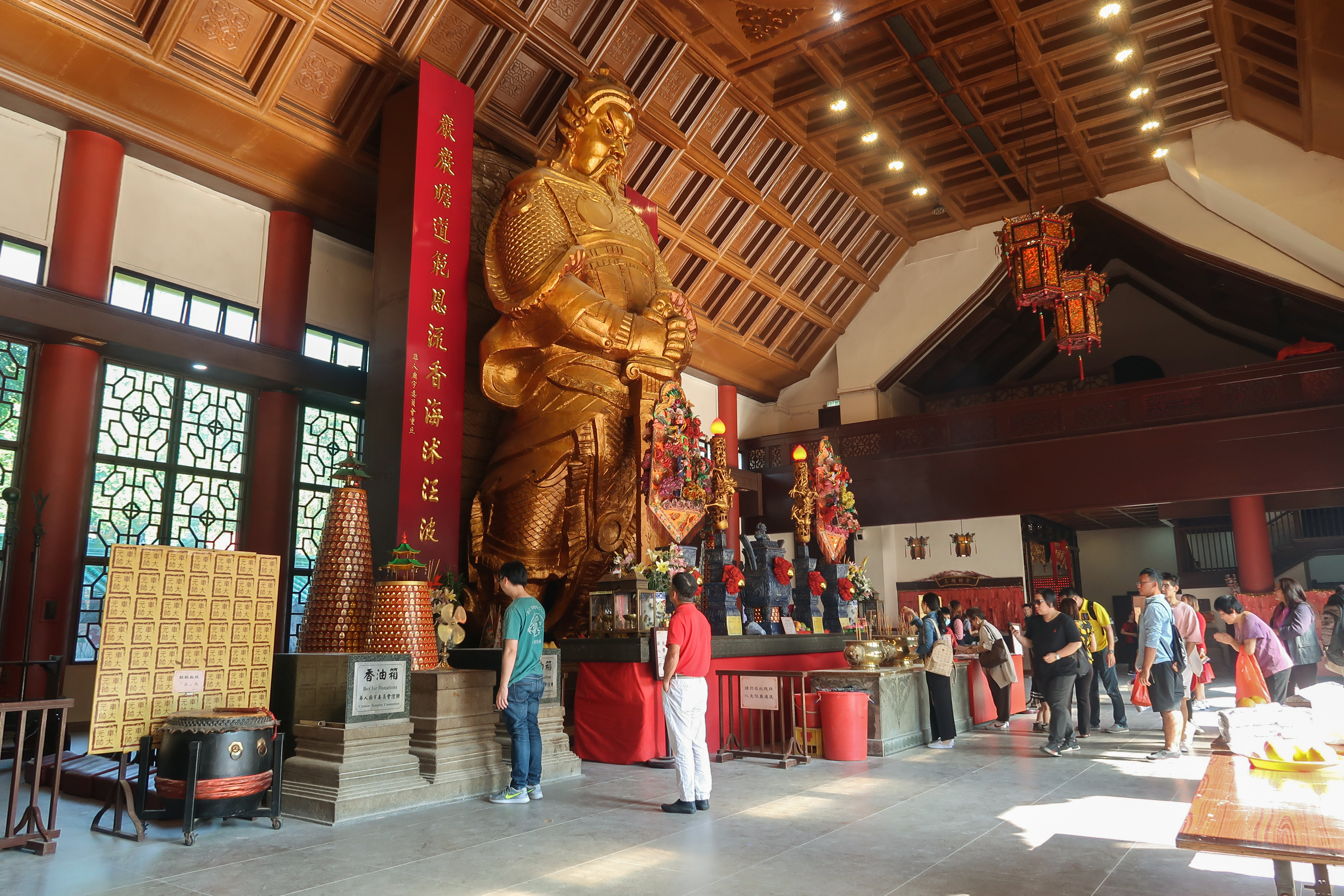
Statue of Che Kung in the main hall of Che Kung Miu in Tai Wai.

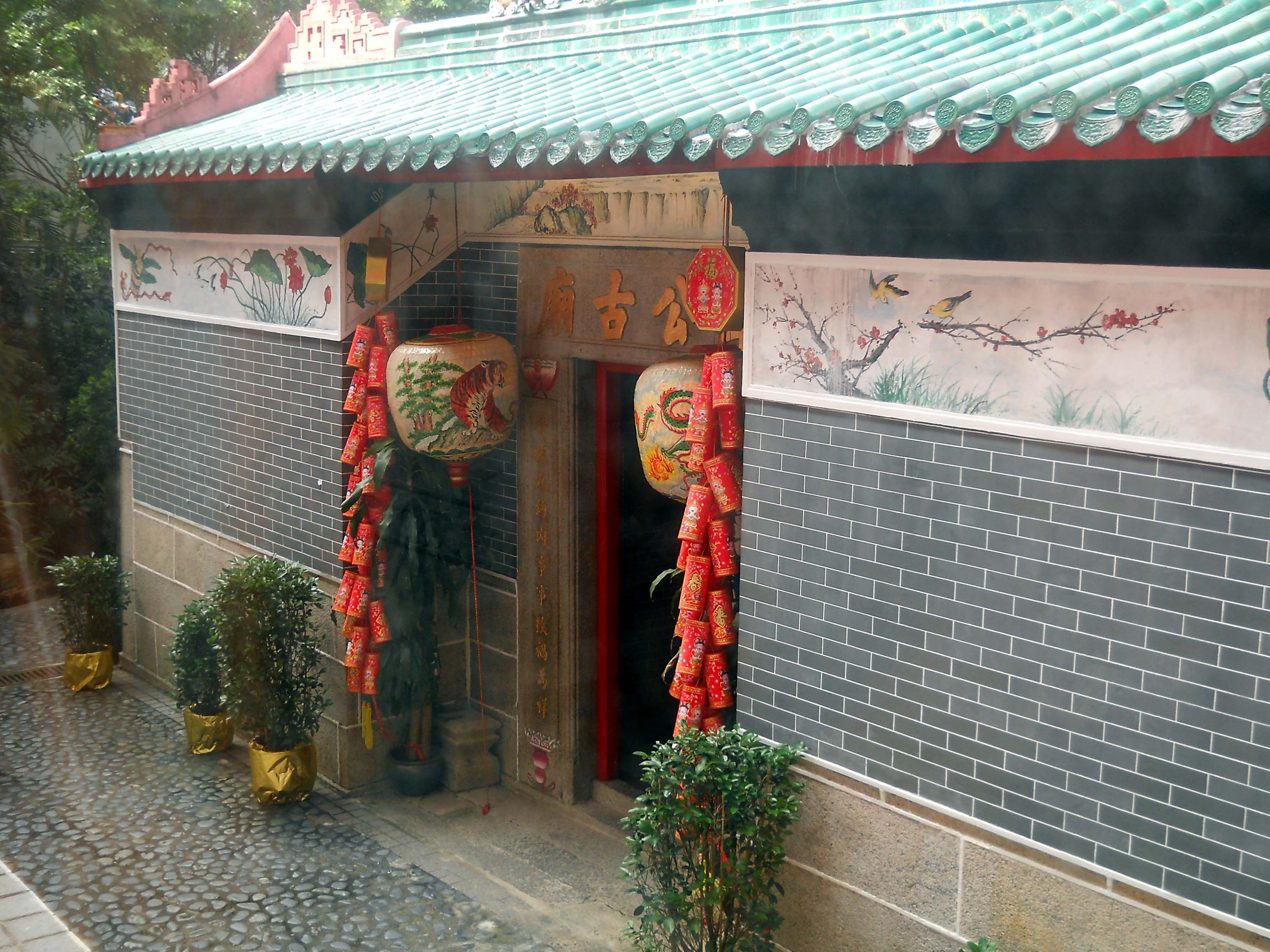
The original Che Kung Miu in Tai Wai, located behind the main hall of the complex.

Che Kung Miu (traditional Chinese: 車公廟; simplified Chinese: 车公庙; pinyin: Chēgōng Miào; Jyutping: ce1 gung1 miu6), also called Che Kung Temple, are temples dedicated to the Chinese deity Che Kung, who was a general during the Southern Song dynasty (1127–1279) in Imperial China. He is believed by some worshipers to have been involved in the attempt to keep the Song state alive by bringing Prince Ping and his brother to the South. There are two temples dedicated to Che Kung in Hong Kong: one in Sha Tin and one in Ho Chung. Other temples in Hong Kong are partly dedicated to Che Kung.

== Tai Wai, Sha Tin District ==
The Che Kung Miu in Tai Wai, in Sha Tin District, New Territories, is the best known example in Hong Kong. During the second and the third days of Lunar New Year, thousands of people go to this temple to worship, including many local Hong Kong government officials. This temple, on Che Kung Miu Road (車公廟路), is located midway between Tai Wai and Che Kung Temple stations of the MTR.

According to as story, during an epidemic that broke out in Sha Tin in the late Ming dynasty (1368–1644), possibly the epidemic of 1629, local residents found out from historical writings that Che Kung was not only merited for his successful suppression of uprisings, but was also known for clearing epidemics wherever he set foot in. People therefore built a temple to house Che Kung in Sha Tin, and the epidemic subsided on the day the construction of the temple was completed. According to oral traditions, the Che Kung Temple at Sha Tin was founded from Ho Chung, when the god was "invited" from the existing Che Kung Temple in Ho Chung to Sha Tin.

The original temple was first built at the end of the Ming Dynasty and was renovated in 1890, 1993 and 2004. The external walls are now plastered with false brick lines and the roofs with green glazed ceramic tiles. The recent renovation is considered to have "very much diminished the authenticity of temple". Due to the high number of worshipers during the Che Kung Festival following the Lunar New Year, a new temple was built in 1994 in front of the original one. The original temple has been preserved in-situ; it is only occasionally open to the public. It is classified as a Grade II historic building since 1987.

The current Che Kung temple, in Japanese-style, was built in 1993–1994 at a cost of HK$48 million. It is eight times the size of the old one. The main hall contains a giant statue of Che Kung. Next to it is a fan-bladed wheel of fortune, which, worshippers believe, will bring good luck when turned three times. Fortune-tellers can be found within the temple.

The Che Kung Temple in Tai Wai was built and initially managed by Tin Sam village of Tai Wai. The village lost its managerial rights in the late 19th century as a consequence of a dispute against the Kau Yeuk (九約, "Alliance of Nine" [villages]), a regional organisation of various groups in Sha Tin Valley, that was settled in a lawsuit at the yamen. The Kau Yeuk had provided evidence that it made significant contributions to the renovation of the temple. The Kau Yeuk could prove its case by referring to the rhymed couplets that were inscribed on both sides of the main entrance and that bore its name. The temple was subsequently jointly managed by nine villages of Sha Tin, while Tin Sam Village continued to enjoy some privileges in the worship of Che Kung. Since 1936, the temple has been administered by the Chinese Temples Committee. Admission to the temple is free, but it is customary for visitors to donate money to support the maintenance of the temple. Its opening hours are 7:00am to 6:00pm daily. Since 2013, the courtyard of the temple can be visited with Google Street View.

== Ho Chung ==
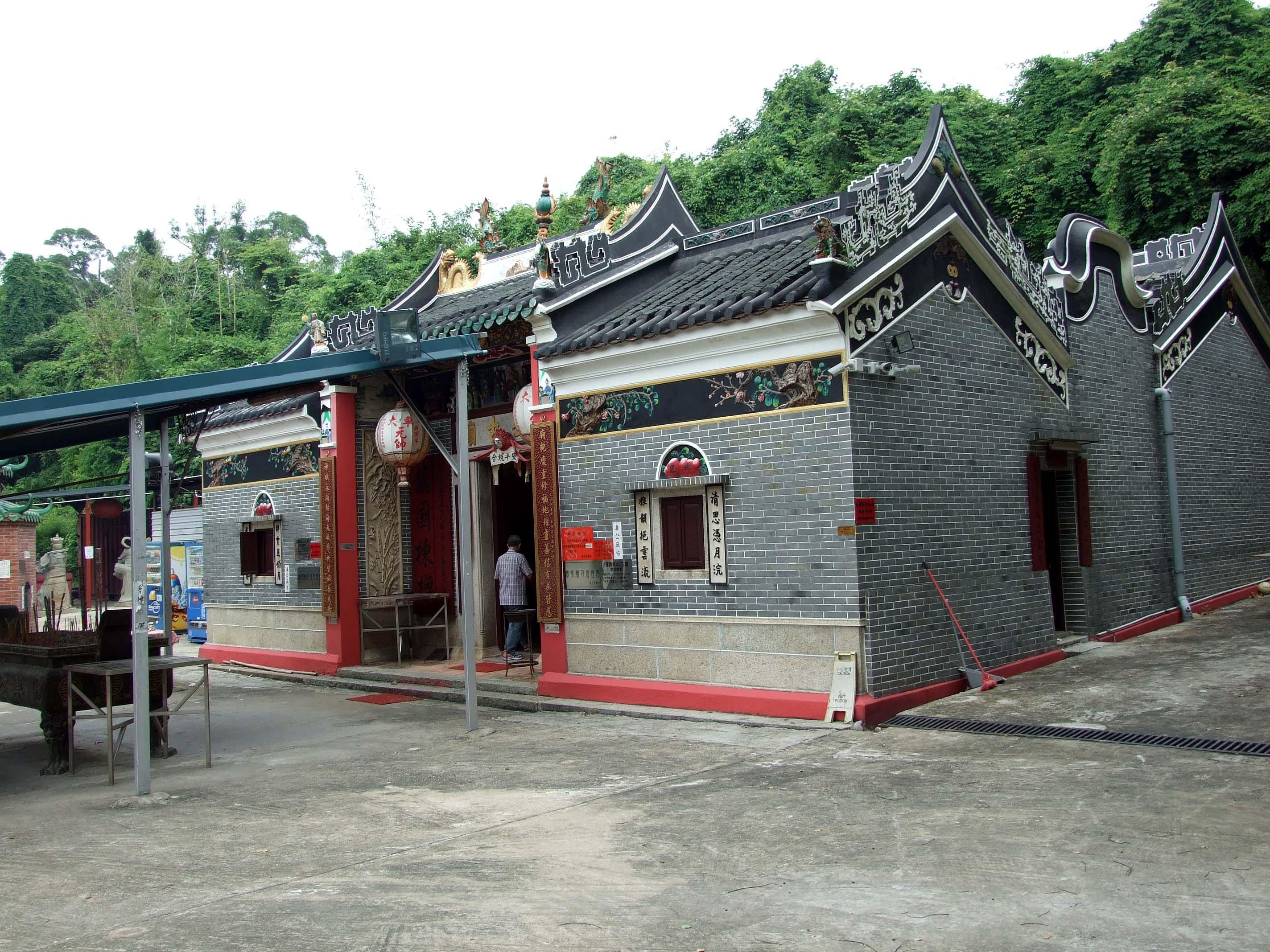
Che Kung Miu in Ho Chung.

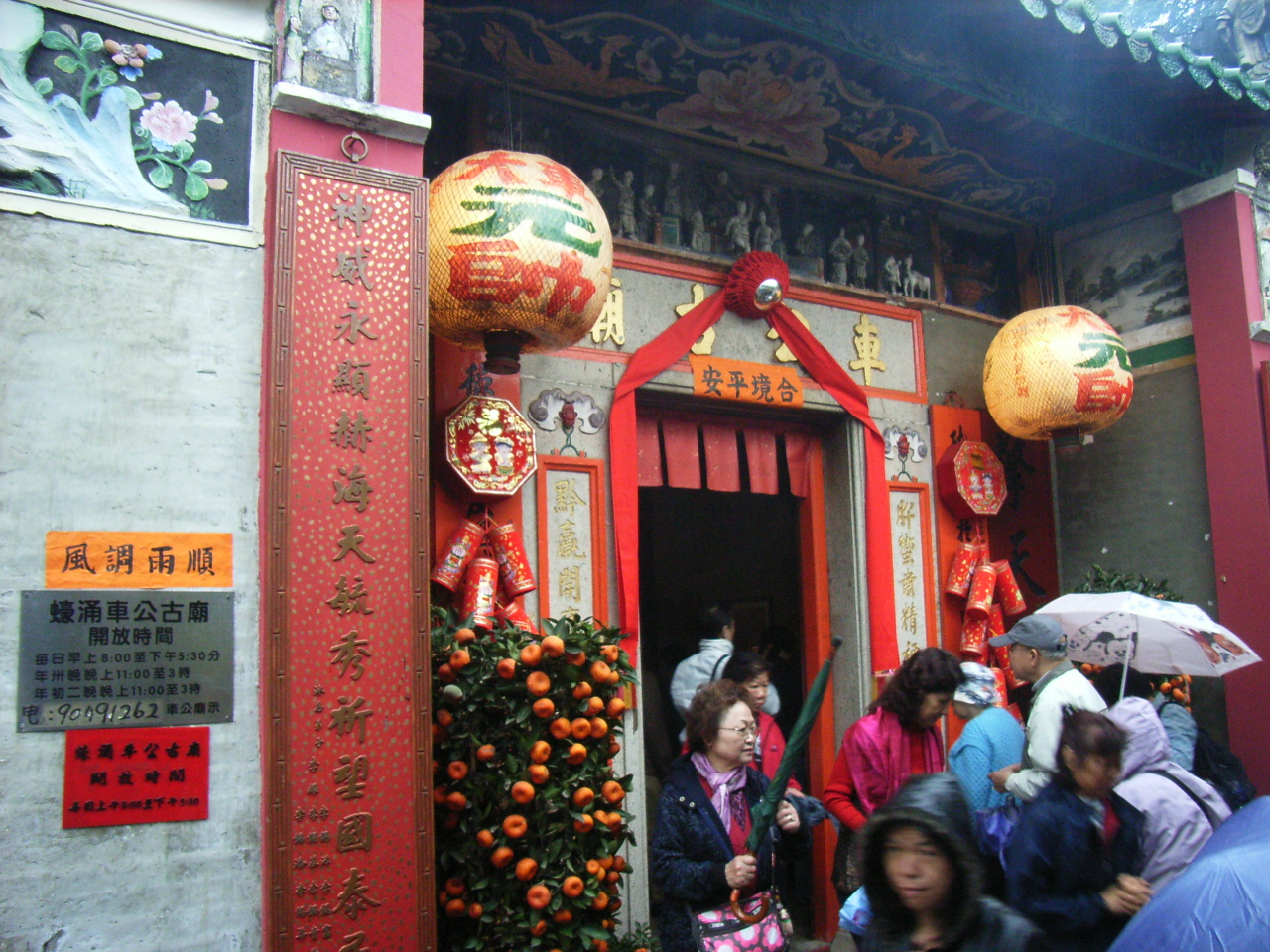
Che Kung Miu in Ho Chung.

Situated on the banks of the Ho Chung River, and half a mile from Ho Chung Village in Sai Kung District, the temple is one of the oldest in Hong Kong and worship General Che, his son and his grandson. Initially built in the mid-16th century, the temple predates its popular counterpart near Tai Wai in Sha Tin District, which is said to worship the grandson of General Che. The present temple structure probably dates largely from 1878, while the temple furniture probably dates from the Xianfeng era (1850–1861).

Residents visit it every Chinese New Year, as the spirit of Che Kung is celebrated alongside memories of family members that have passed to the next life.

Other deities worshipped at the temple include Hung Shing, Tin Hau and Choi Pak Shing Kun (財帛星君).

Run by villagers for over 300 years, the temple is now being kept by Wan Sai Cheung of the Wan family who have been residents in Ho Chung village for many generations. While the temple has been renovated several times, it is considered that "the authenticity [of the building] is in general kept". Known renovation dates include 1908, 1994 and 2002, while other sources also mention 1934 and 2000. It was listed as a Grade II historic building in 1996, and as a Grade I historic building in 2009.

== I Shing Temple ==
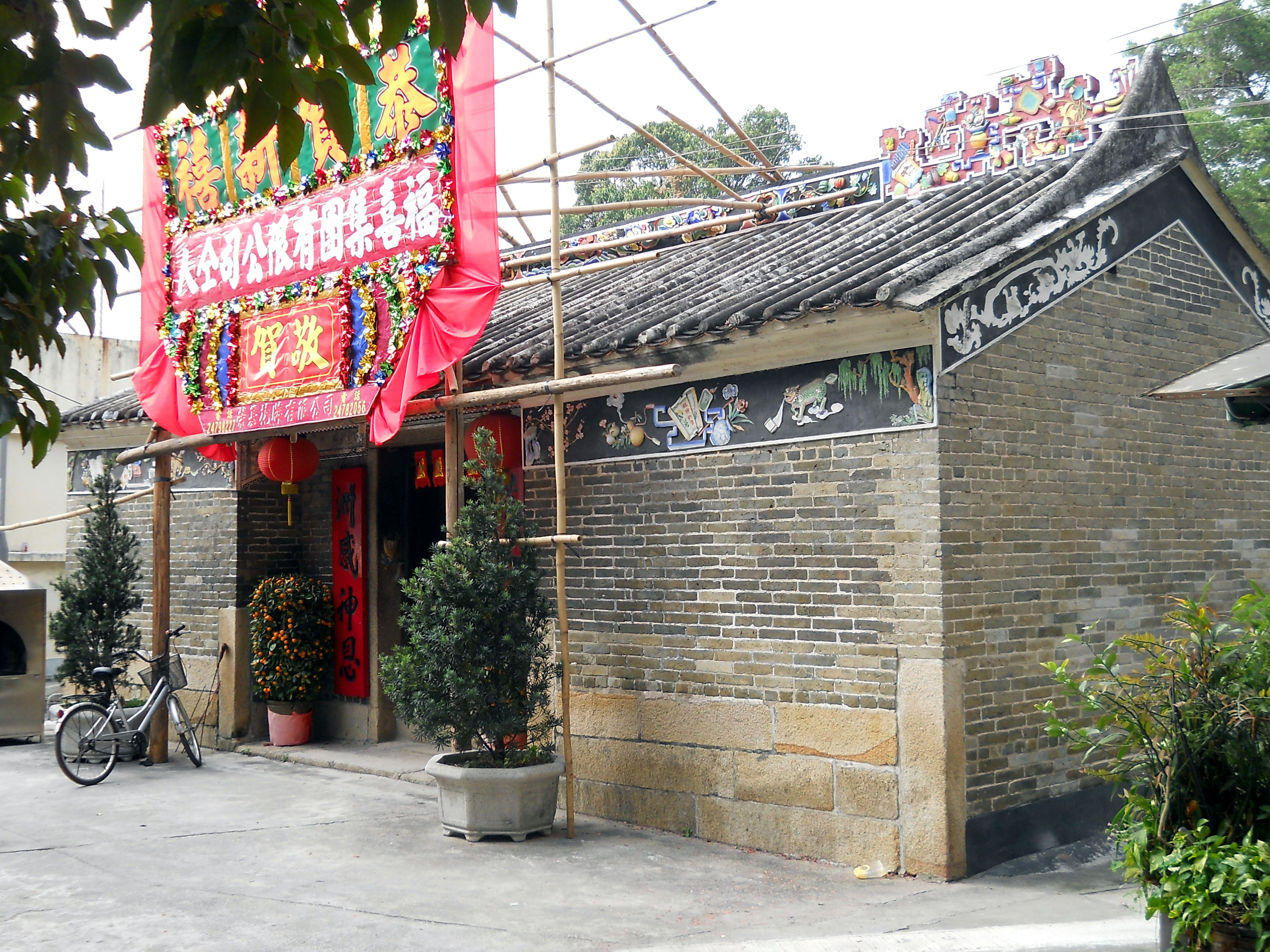
I Shing Temple in Wang Chau.

I Shing Temple (二聖宮; 'temple of two gods') in Tung Tau Wai, Wang Chau, is dedicated to Hung Shing and Che Kung. Built in 1718, it was declared a monument in 1996.

== Other temples ==
Other temples in Hong Kong are partly dedicated to Che Kung. These include:

- In the Chung Shing Temple (眾聖宮; 'Temple of All Saints'), the village shrine of Wing Lung Wai, Kam Tin, eleven deities are worshiped, including Kwun Yam, Hung Shing and Che Kung.

== Festivals ==
There are four annual Che Kung Festivals (車公誕):

- 2nd day of the first lunar month, the most popular, is Che Kung's birthday. People come to the temple to worship Che Kung, turn fan-bladed wheels of fortune and beat the drum to ensure good luck in the coming year. About 100,000 people visit the Tai Wai Temple at this time of the year. Crowd management and traffic arrangements are implemented each year during the festival.
- 27th day of the third lunar month
- 6th day of the sixth lunar month
- 16th day of the eighth lunar month

== Birthday of Che Kung ==
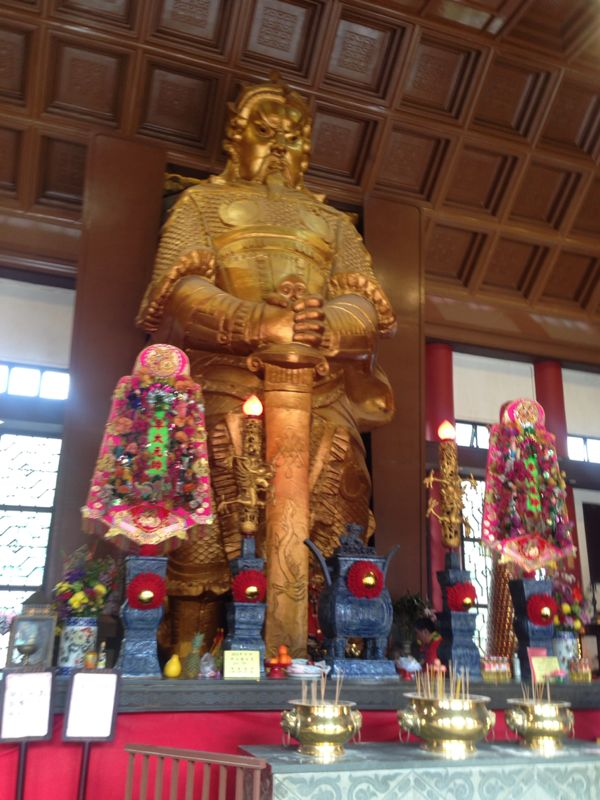
Statue of Che Kung in Che Kung Temple, Tai Wai, Sha Tin District.

Che Kung festival or the Birthday of Che Kung is the day when people celebrate the birth of Che Kung. On this day, people, especially Hong Kong residents, go to Che Kung Temple and worship Che Kung. Che Kung was a military commander in Southern Song dynasty. He protected the Emperor Bing of Song to escape Mongol invaders and is considered as loyal to the emperors.

The real birthday of Che Kung is 2 January in the Chinese lunar calendar. Nevertheless, people prefer the next day to celebrate his birthday.

=== Procedures of the festival celebration ===
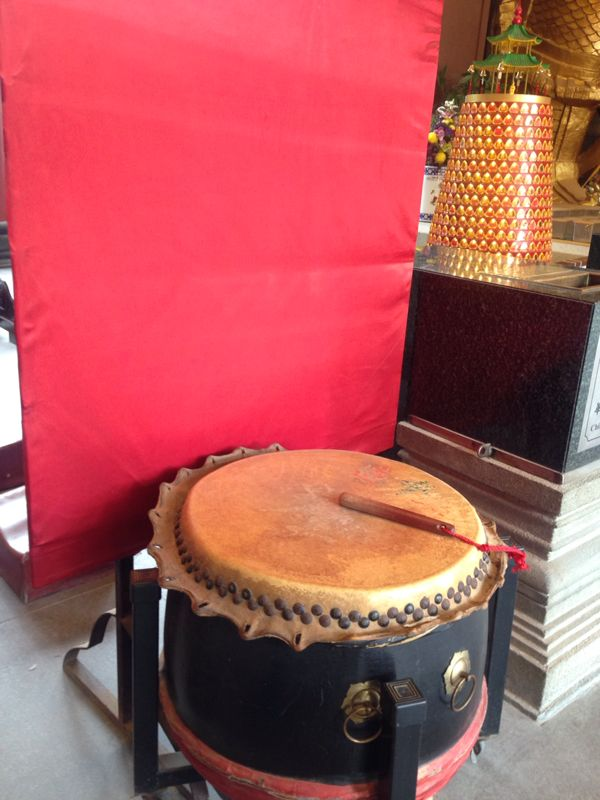
Drum of Heaven

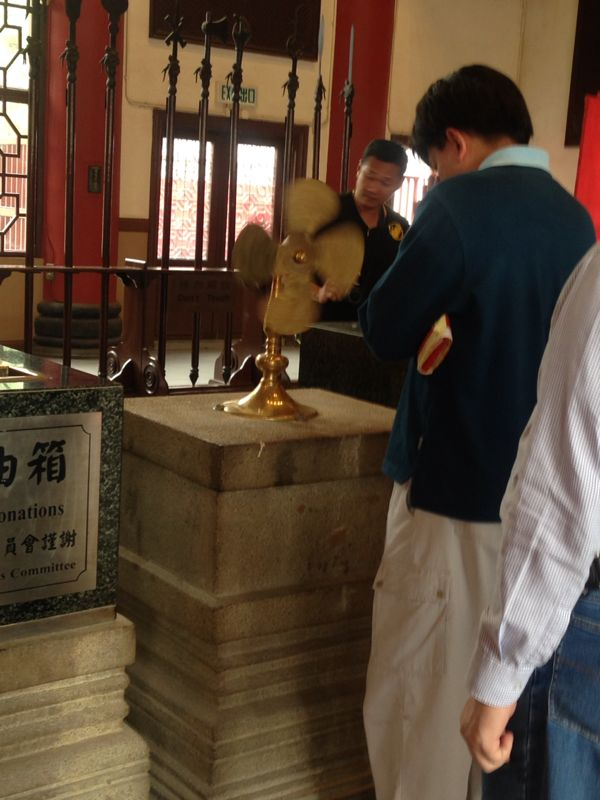
Wheeling the Golden Pinwheel

They are:

1. Preparing of the offerings, they may include: incense sticks, red candles, fresh fruits, flowers, meats and any other Chinese New Year food.
2. Hitting the ‘Drum of heaven’ (天鼓) to inform Che Kung the worshiper has come.
3. Placing the offerings in front of the statue of Che Kung, and then lighting up the candles and burning the incense sticks.
4. Telling Che Kung personal information and wishes while offering the incense in the main hall.
5. Burning the paper clothes, paper money and other paper offerings to Che Kung in the assigned area.
6. Spinning the golden pinwheel with the left hand outside the temple clockwise if to continue good luck from last year into the coming year; otherwise, to change bad luck last year into good luck for in the coming year, the pinwheel is spun counterclockwise.
7. Buying a personal pinwheel and placing it in a position that abides by the principles of Feng Shui.
8. Returning to the temple and giving offerings to Che Kung to thank him for his care in the prior year.

Apart from the ceremony carried in the above hall, there are other practices to be done in the subordinate halls e.g. Tai Sui (太歲), Cai Shen (財神). For believers who are students, they often write down their name and wishes on a praying paper, and stick it onto a board called Jinbang timing board (金榜題名板) to pray for better academic achievements. To express their respect to Che Kung, believers may donate to the temple (添香油). Divination (求籤) is also practised in Che Kung Temple as a way of fortune-telling.

=== Popularity and its believers ===
During the Che Kung festival in 2014, 65 thousand people went to Che Kung Temple. Followers believe practising divination in Che Kung temple has resulted in accurate predictions in the past. The first time was in 2003, Minister of Home Affairs Dr Patrick Ho Chi-Ping on behalf of the city pulled out the worst possible bamboo stick in the temple on the Birthday of Che Kung. In the same year, Hong Kong was hit by the severe acute respiratory syndrome (SARS) outbreak.

Therefore, the person on behalf of Hong Kong practising divination on the Birthday of Che Kung has changed to Lau Wong Fat, the minister of Heung Yee Kuk since 2004.

The Birthday of Che Kung also relates to some political controversy. In the event of Hong Kong Express Rail Link controversy, about 20 post-80s generation anti-rail representatives joined the Hong Kong Government Lunar New Year kau chim tradition at Che Kung temple, Sha Tin to draw three divination sticks as a way of demonstration to express their anger towards Hong Kong government.

=== Ritual meanings ===
==== Purpose of the ceremony and date selection ====
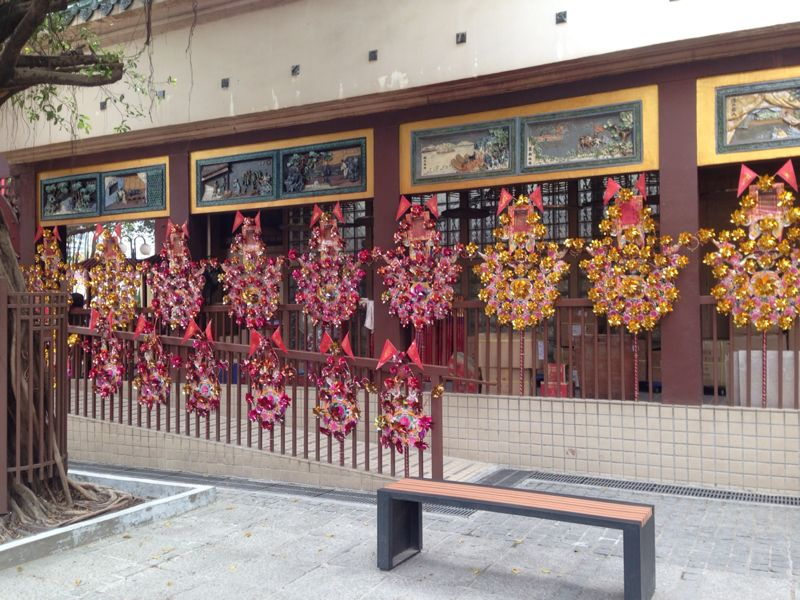
Pinwheels

Che Kung is famous for his power to suppress chaos and his supreme ability to cure diseases. Precisely because of the abilities of Che Kung, he was soon revered as a "God" and has been considered as a "God of protection". Consequently, his followers and worshipers constructed a temple specifically for Che Kung in order to praise his power and good deeds.

Moreover, there are four festival seasons of Che Kung’s birthday in Lunar Calendar (including 2/1, 27/3, 6/6 and 16/8). Since the first festival season falls on the Lunar New Year holiday, believers have dedicated the third day of the Lunar New Year as an annual event to worship Che Kung, and the celebration is known as "The Birthday of Che Kung" nowadays.

==== Meanings behind the objects used ====
Devotees choose to burn incense sticks. Burning incense sticks is a common practice during the festival, because the process of burning incense sticks and the rising smoke symbolizes the appreciation of the devotees to the blessing and protection from Che Kung of the previous year. Devotees would also tell their living problems to Che Kung and hope that he will fulfill their wish. It is believed that their wishes will be carried up to heaven to Che Kung by the smoke of the incense.

Pinwheels can always be found next to the effigy of Che Kung, and they are regarded as 'a wheel of fortune'. It is believed that the one who turns the pinwheel will be granted with prosperity and good luck for the entire year.

=== Reflection of Chinese cultures/values ===
In Chinese culture, worshiping Che Kung is similar to worshiping Guandi, a god widely worshiped within Chinese communities as they believe he protects the entire nation. Both of them were generals protecting their country and demonstrated the loyalty to the motherland and to the people. Hong Kong local residents believe that Che Kung would protect them and their villages as he protected the Song dynasty. Being deeply influenced by Confucianism, Chinese people admire the bravery and uprightness of Che Kung.

On the 3rd of First Month in Lunar Month, traditionally, Chinese people think it is easy to have an argument with other people and this will give them misfortune. To prevent this curse from happening, Chinese people would like to worship folk god(s). That is the reason why so many people choose this day to go to worship Che Kung and pray for their fortune in the following year.

== See also ==
- Che Kung
- Chinese folk religion
- Hong Kong Government Lunar New Year kau chim tradition
- I Shing Temple, dedicated to Hung Shing and Che Kung
- Places of worship in Hong Kong
- Taoism in Hong Kong
