= Shui Tin Tsuen =

Village in Hong Kong

Coordinates: 22.448275°N 114.020796°E

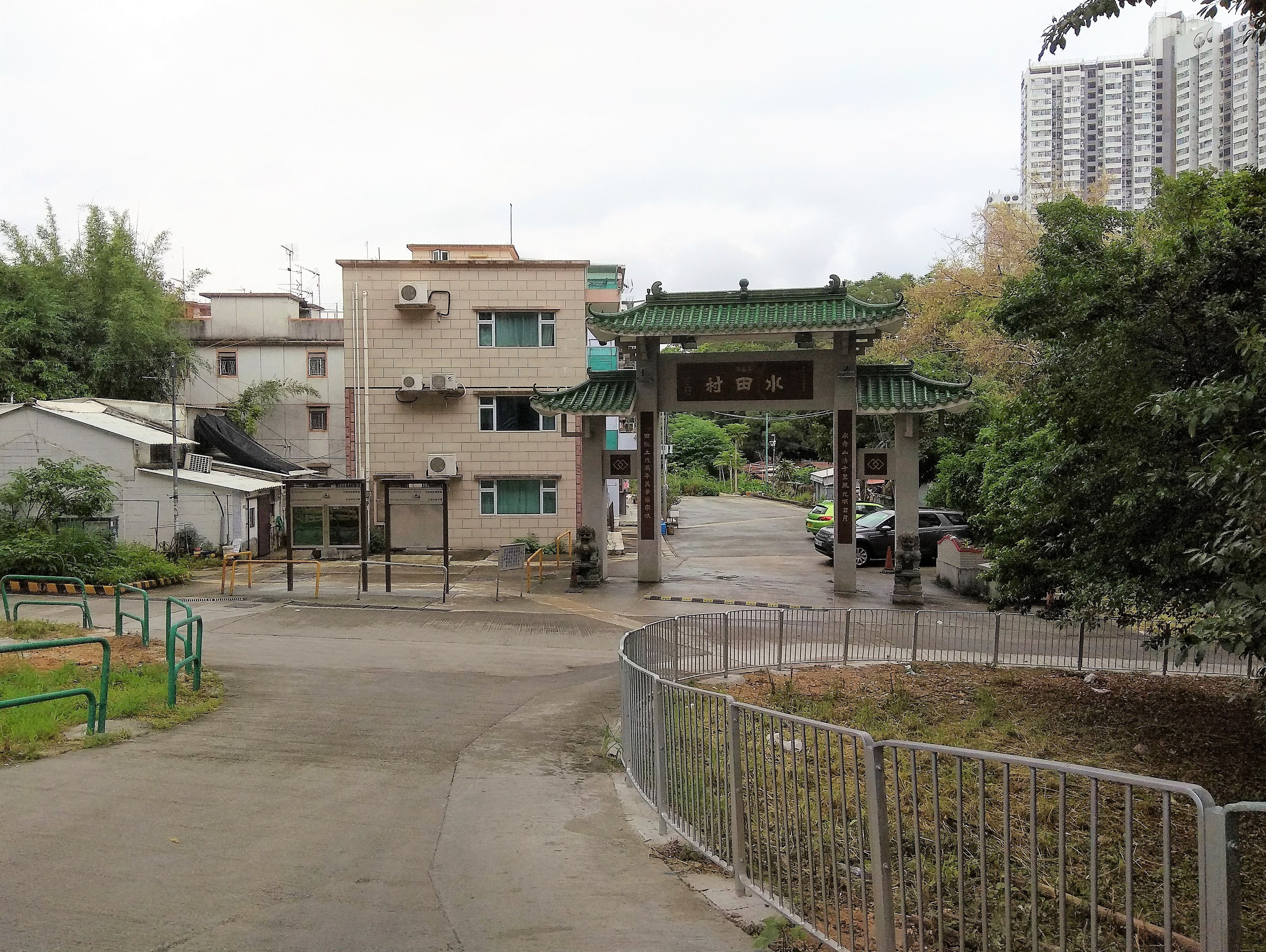
Shui Tin Tsuen in 2020

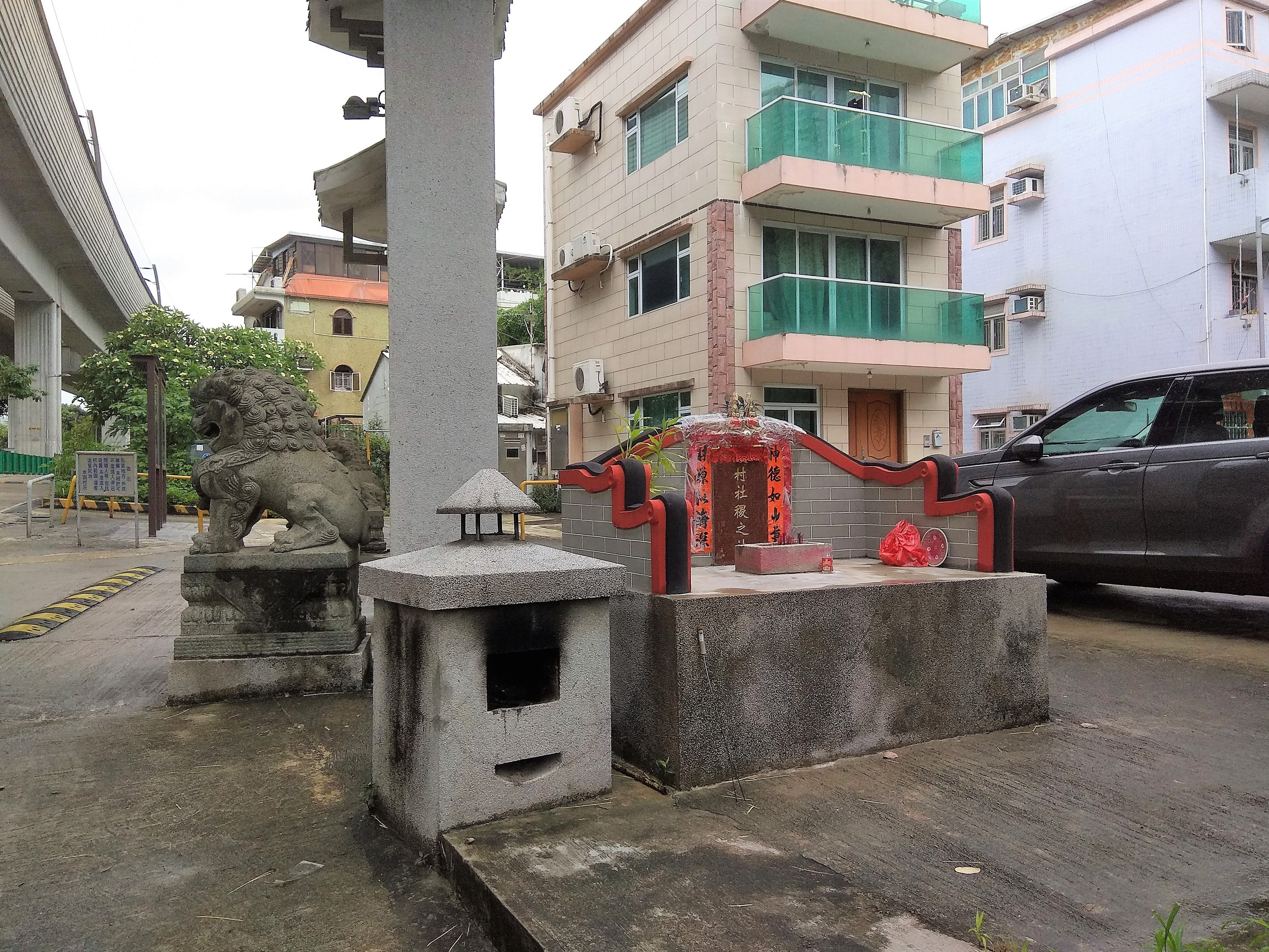
Shui Tin Tsuen in 2020

Shui Tin Tsuen (Chinese: 水田村) is a village in Wang Chau, Yuen Long District, Hong Kong.

== Administration ==
Shui Tin Tsuen is a recognized village under the New Territories Small House Policy. It is one of the 37 villages represented within the Ping Shan Rural Committee. For electoral purposes, Shui Tin Tsuen is part of the Ping Shan Central constituency, which is currently represented by Felix Cheung Chi-yeung.
