= Ha Mei San Tsuen =

Village in Hong Kong

Coordinates: 22.454059°N 114.010297°E

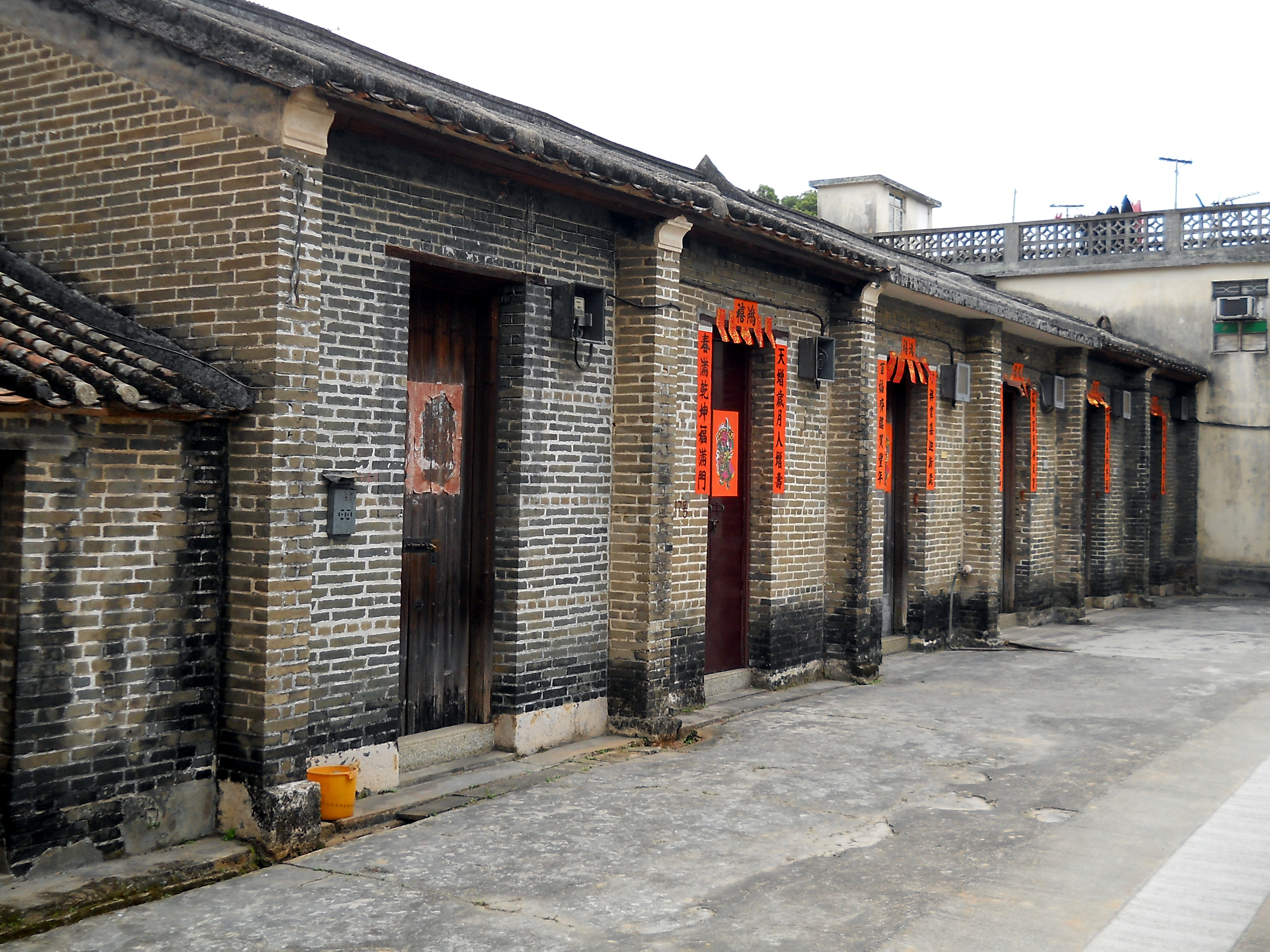
Nos. 13–19, Ha Mei San Tsuen in March 2013.

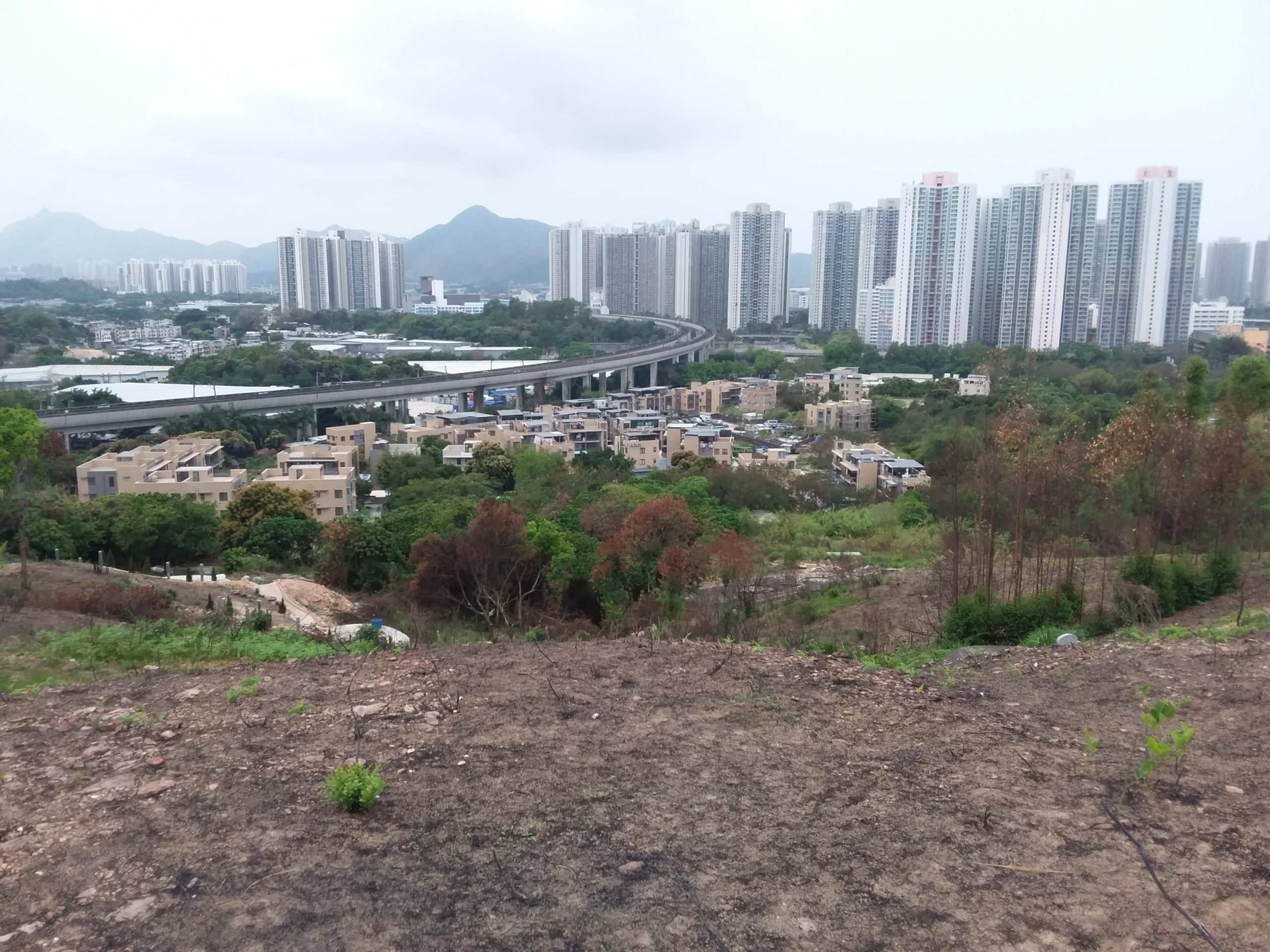
View of Ha Mei San Tsuen and Tin Shui Wai from Kai Shan.

Ha Mei San Tsuen (Chinese: 蝦尾新村) is a village in Wang Chau, Yuen Long District, Hong Kong.

== Administration ==
Ha Mei San Tsuen is a recognized village under the New Territories Small House Policy. It is one of the 37 villages represented within the Ping Shan Rural Committee. For electoral purposes, Ha Mei San Tsuen is part of the Ping Shan Central constituency.
