= Fung Ka Wai =

Village in Hong Kong

Coordinates: 22.457319°N 114.011971°E

Fung Ka Wai (Chinese: 馮家圍) is a village in Wang Chau, Yuen Long District, Hong Kong.

== Administration ==
Fung Ka Wai is a recognized village under the New Territories Small House Policy. It is one of the 37 villages represented within the Ping Shan Rural Committee. For electoral purposes, Fung Ka Wai is part of the Ping Shan Central constituency.

== History ==
Fung Ka Wai has historically been mainly occupied by members of the Fung family. The Fungs came from Huizhou in Guangdong province. They first settled in the village of Tong Fong Tsuen in the Ping Shan area, where they worked for the Tang Clan as farmers. They then moved to the present area which was previously called Kok Tsz Tau (角子頭) and established their own village in 1895 (or 1912) after having some savings. They started with mat-sheds and later built their houses with green bricks and mud bricks.

In 1985, the village was described as small, consisting of three rows of houses facing southwest and linked by lower structures to form an enclosed rectangle.
