= Wang Chau (Yuen Long) =

Area of Yuen Long District, Hong Kong

Coordinates: 22.452204°N 114.019068°E

- Traditional Chinese: 橫洲
- Simplified Chinese: 横洲
Transcriptions
Standard Mandarin
- Hanyu Pinyin: Héngzhōu
Yue: Cantonese
- Jyutping: waang4 zau1

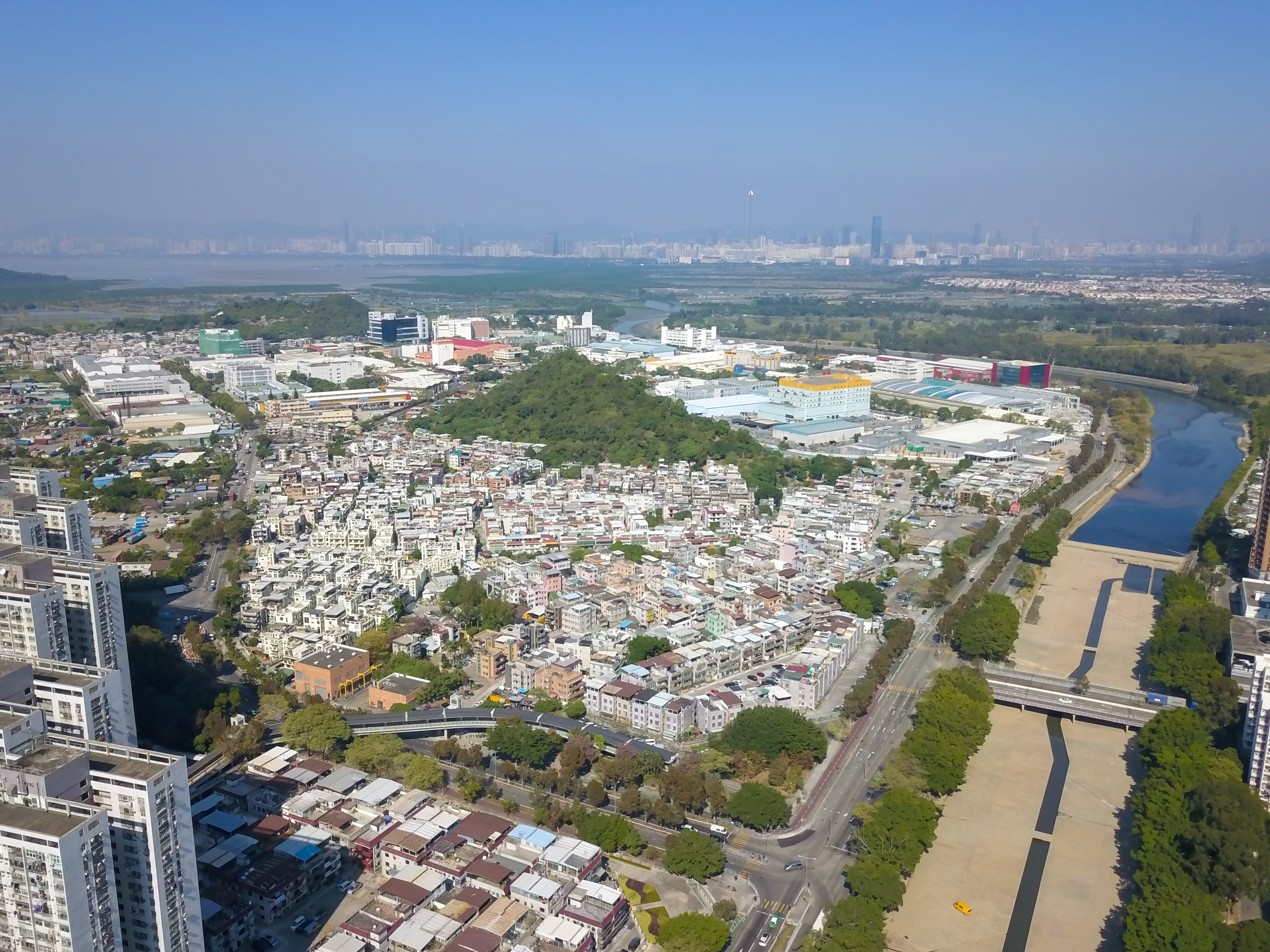
Wang Chau and Yuen Long Industrial Estate.

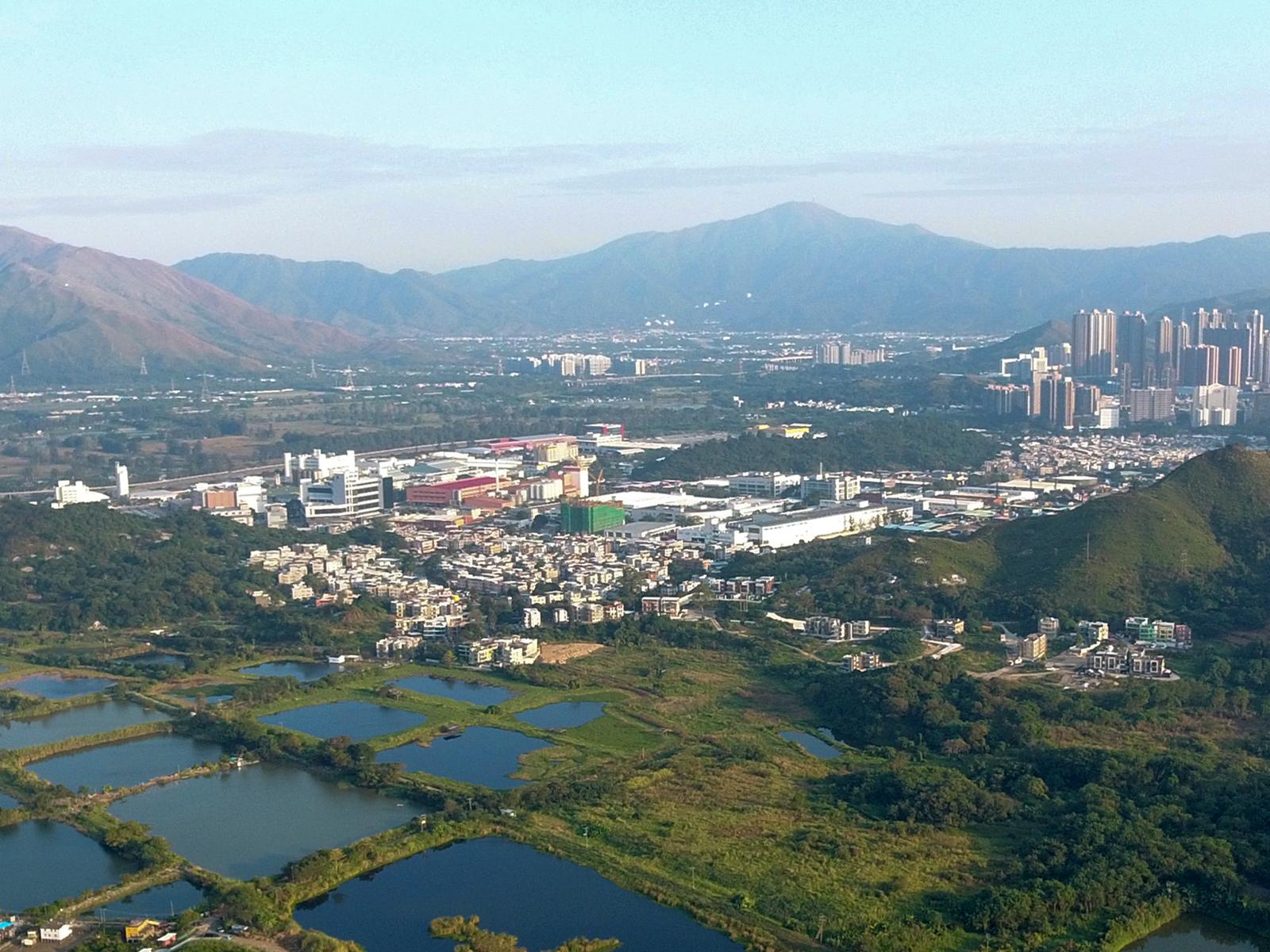
Wang Chau. The ponds in the foreground are part of Fung Lok Wai.

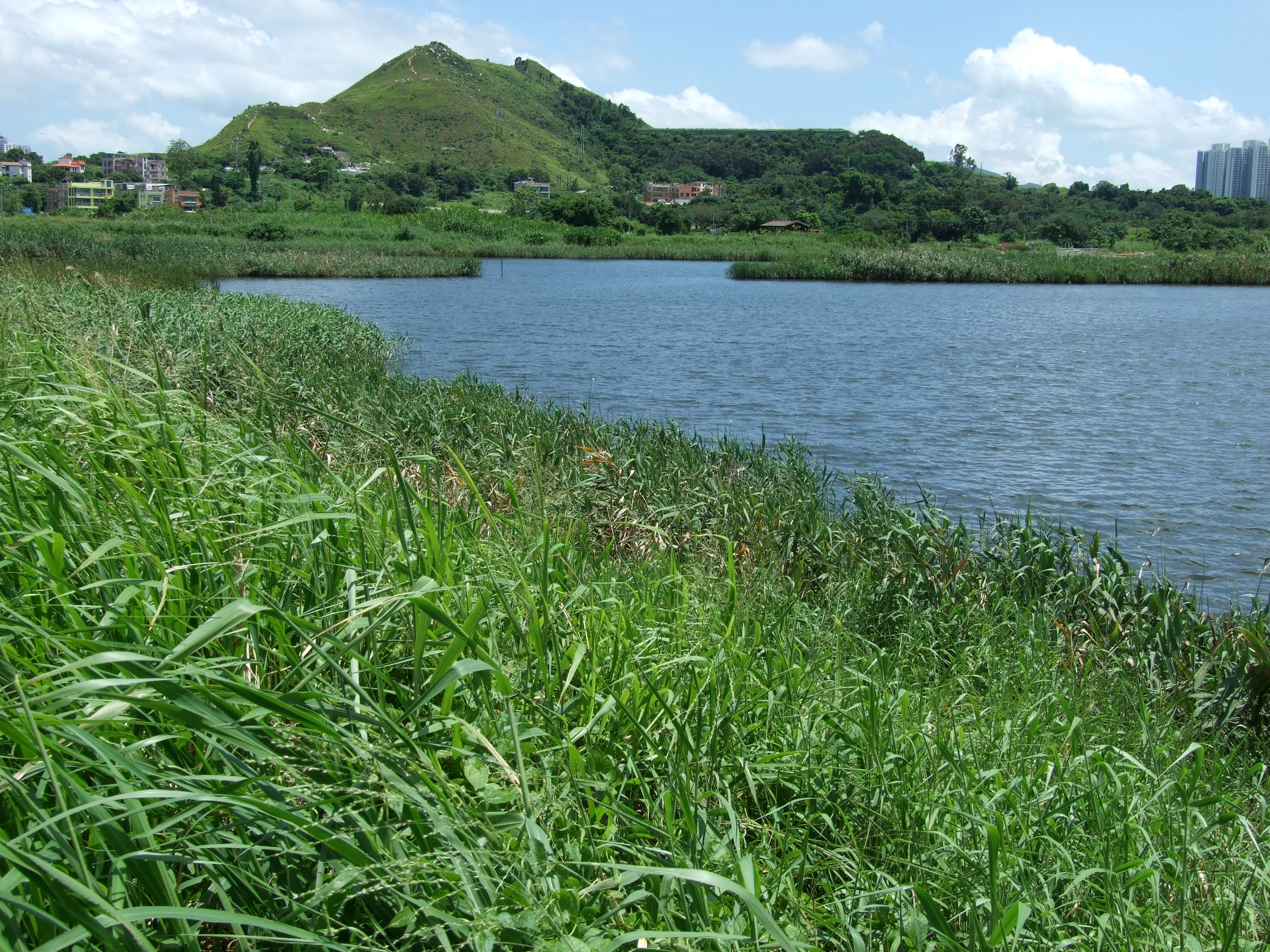
Kai Shan (髻山), a hill in Wang Chau, viewed from the fish ponds of Fung Lok Wai.

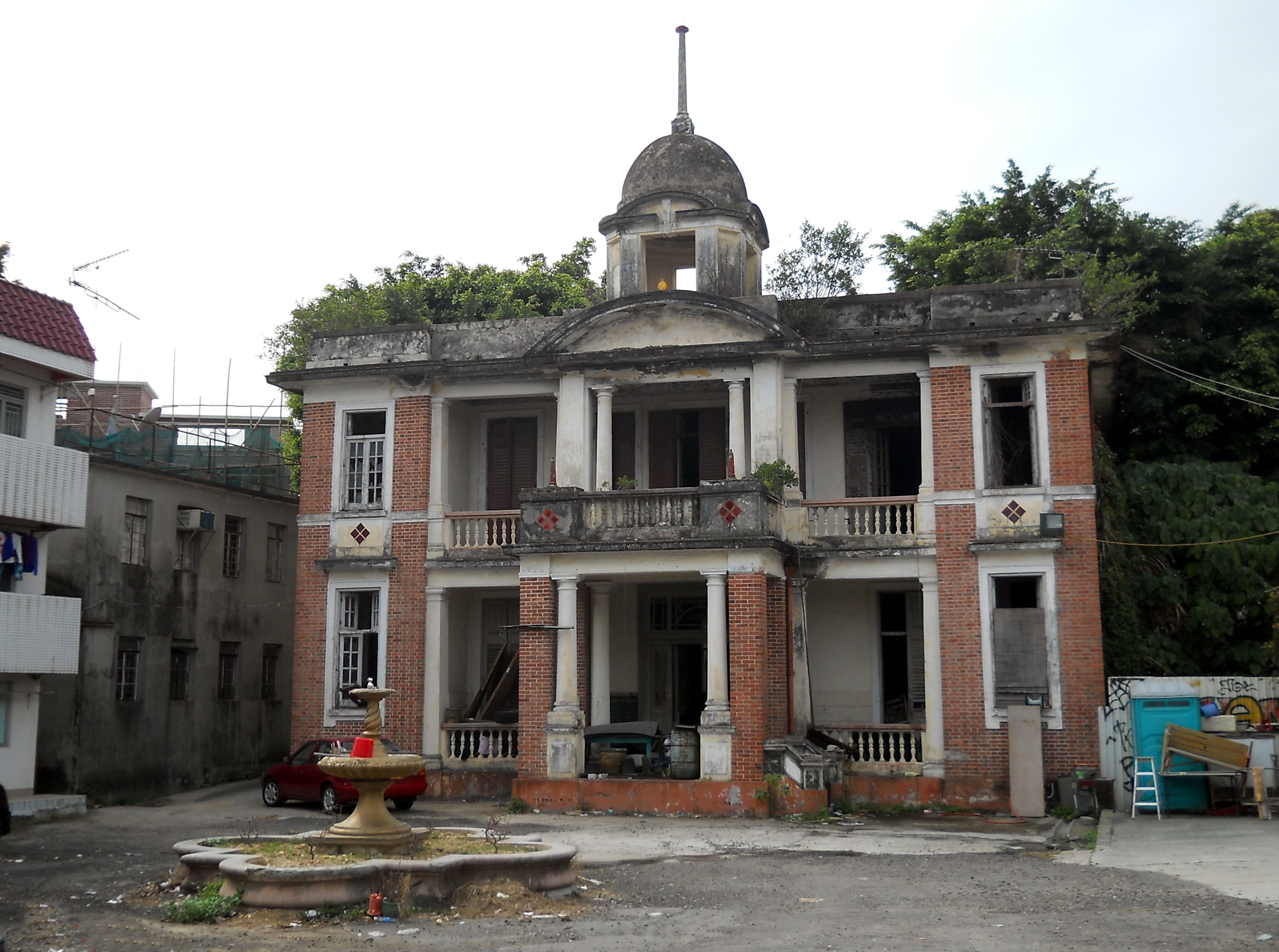
Yu Yuen, in Tung Tau Wai, Wang Chau

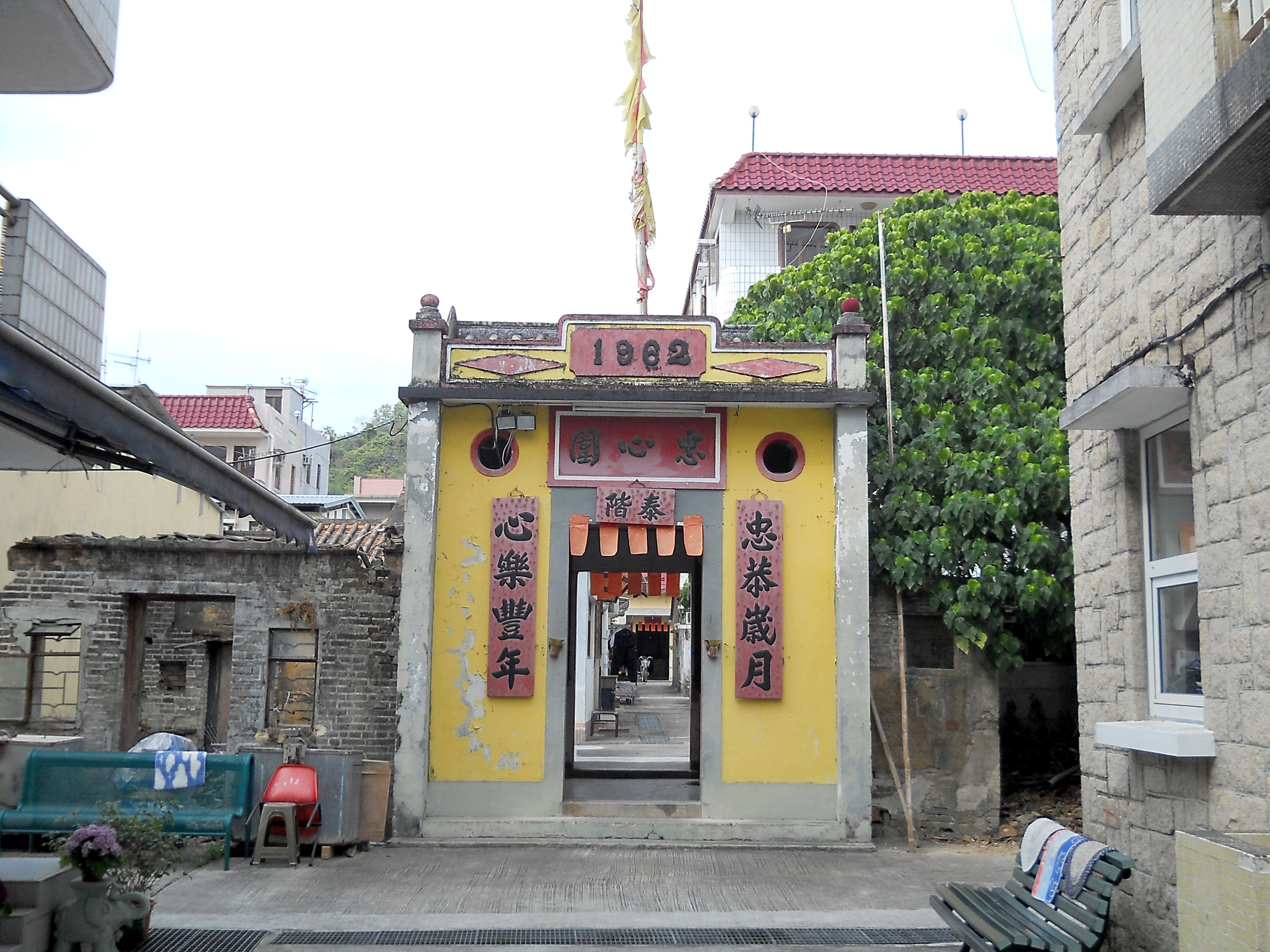
Entrance gate of Chung Sum Wai, a walled village in Wang Chau.

Wang Chau (Chinese: 橫洲) is an area of Yuen Long District, located in the northwestern part of Hong Kong, west of the Shan Pui River.

== Geography ==
Wang Chau comprises two hills: Kai Shan and Chu Wong Ling (豬黃嶺). Chu Wong Ling includes a shrub covered hillock.

== Villages ==
Wang Chau comprises several villages:

- The "Six Villages of Wang Chau" (橫洲六村)
  - Tung Tau Wai (東頭圍)
  - Chung Sum Wai (中心圍), a walled village
  - Sai Tau Wai (西頭圍)
  - Fuk Hing Tsuen (福慶村)
  - Yeung Uk Tsuen (楊屋村)
  - Lam Uk Tsuen (林屋村)
- Ng Uk Tsuen (吳屋村)
- Tai Tseng Wai (大井圍), a walled village
- Shing Uk Tsuen (盛屋村)
- "Waterside area" (「水邊約」)
  - Shui Pin Wai (水邊圍), a walled village
  - Shui Pin Tsuen (水邊村)
  - Shui Tin Tsuen (水田村)
  - Fung Chi Tsuen (鳳池村)
  - Ha Mei San Tsuen (蝦尾新村)
- Wing Ning Tsuen (永寧村)
- Fung Ka Wai (馮家圍)

== Housing ==
Long Ping Estate is a mixed public/TPS estate in Wang Chau.

=== Public housing programme controversy ===
Within days of the 2016 legislative elections and the decisive victory of Eddie Chu in the New Territories West constituency, Chu made allegations that the government was in collusion with business interests, rural kingpins and Triads about the planned development of public housing on the Wang Chau site. Although CY Leung initially attempted to blame Financial Secretary John Tsang and Chief Secretary Carrie Lam, leaked internal government meeting minutes directly implicated CY Leung in a decision to defer to the interests of Heung Yee Kuk leaders by scaling down the planned housing development in Wang Chau from 13,000 units to 4000 units, razing a greenfield site whilst avoiding brownfield site illegally occupied by the chairman of the rural committee in Shap Pat Heung.

On 21 September 2016, the government held a press conference responding to recent concerns over the public housing program in Wang Chau. Chief Executive CY Leung stated that it was his decision to implement the first phase of the program in which 4,000 units would be provided.

== Sights ==
Several historic buildings are located in Wang Chau, including:

- I Shing Temple (二聖宮), in Tung Tau Wai (東頭圍). Built in 1718, it is dedicated to Hung Shing and Che Kung. It was declared a monument in 1996.
- Yu Yuen (娛苑), in Tung Tau Wai (東頭圍), was built in 1927 as a summer villa. It is listed as a Grade I Historic Building.
- Tin Hau Temple in Ng Uk Village (吳屋村). It was rebuilt in 1981.

== Education ==
Wang Chau is in Primary One Admission (POA) School Net 73. Within the school net are multiple aided schools (operated independently but funded with government money) and one government school: South Yuen Long Government Primary School (南元朗官立小學).

== Transport ==
Wang Chau is located between the Tin Shui Wai and Long Ping stations of the MTR.

== See also ==
- Yuen Long Industrial Estate
- Kai Shan, a hill in Wang Chau
- Fung Lok Wai, an area of fish ponds located north of Wang Chau
