= Lam Uk Tsuen =

Village of Hong Kong

Coordinates: 22.452994°N 114.027148°E

Lam Uk Tsuen (Chinese: 林屋村) is a village in Wang Chau, Yuen Long District, Hong Kong.

== Administration ==
Lam Uk Tsuen is a recognized village under the New Territories Small House Policy. It is one of the 37 villages represented within the Ping Shan Rural Committee. For electoral purposes, Lam Uk Tsuen is part of the Ping Shan North constituency.

== See also ==
- I Shing Temple
