= Fuk Hing Tsuen =

Village in Hong Kong

Coordinates: 22.454987°N 114.025780°E

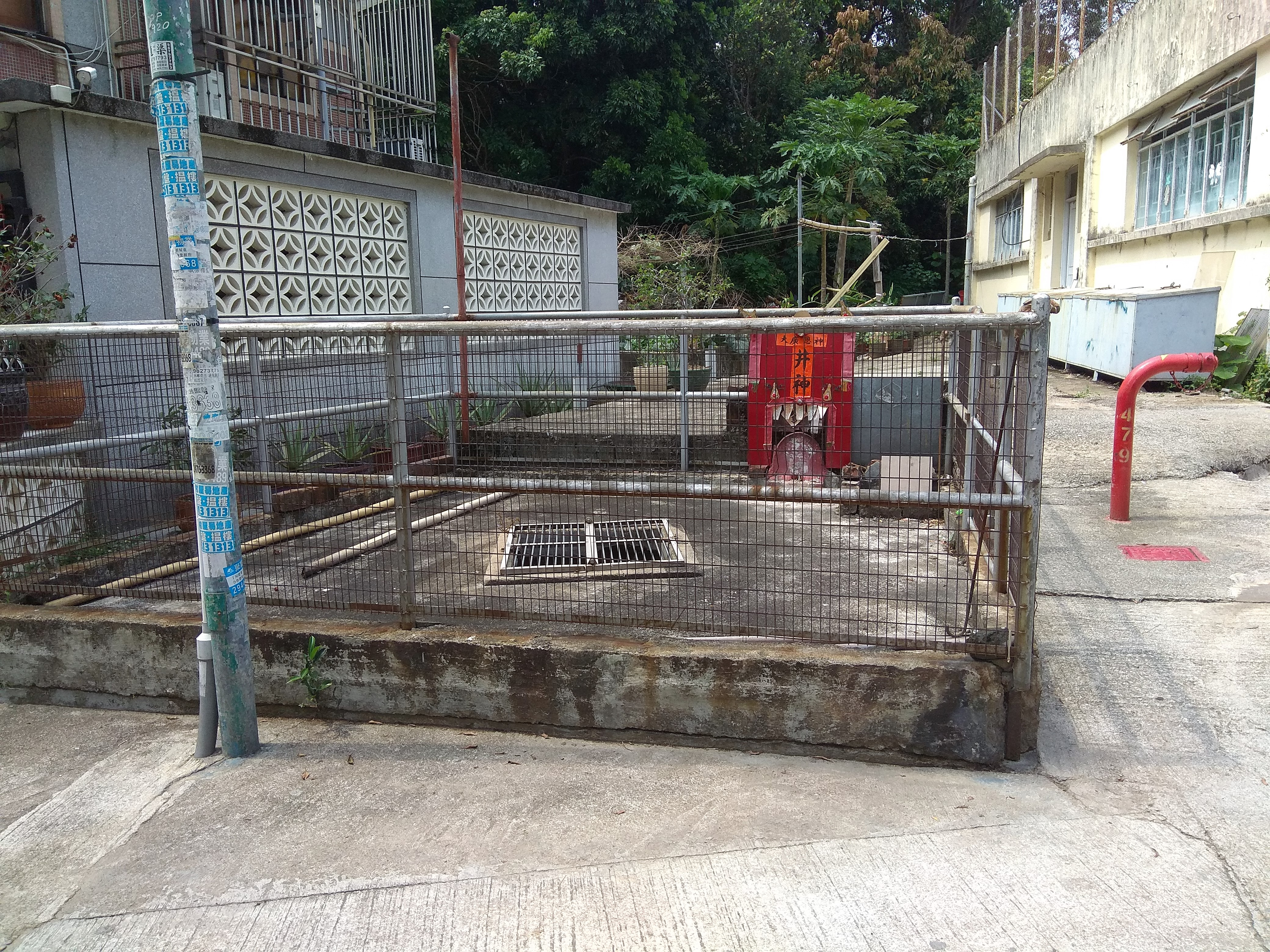
Old water well in Fuk Hing Tsuen.

Fuk Hing Tsuen (Chinese: 福慶村) is a village in Wang Chau, Yuen Long District, Hong Kong.

== Administration ==
Fuk Hing Tsuen is a recognized village under the New Territories Small House Policy. It is one of the 37 villages represented within the Ping Shan Rural Committee. For electoral purposes, Fuk Hing Tsuen is part of the Ping Shan North constituency.

== See also ==
- I Shing Temple
