= Chung Sum Wai (Wang Chau) =

Village in Hong Kong

Coordinates: 22.453761°N 114.026896°E

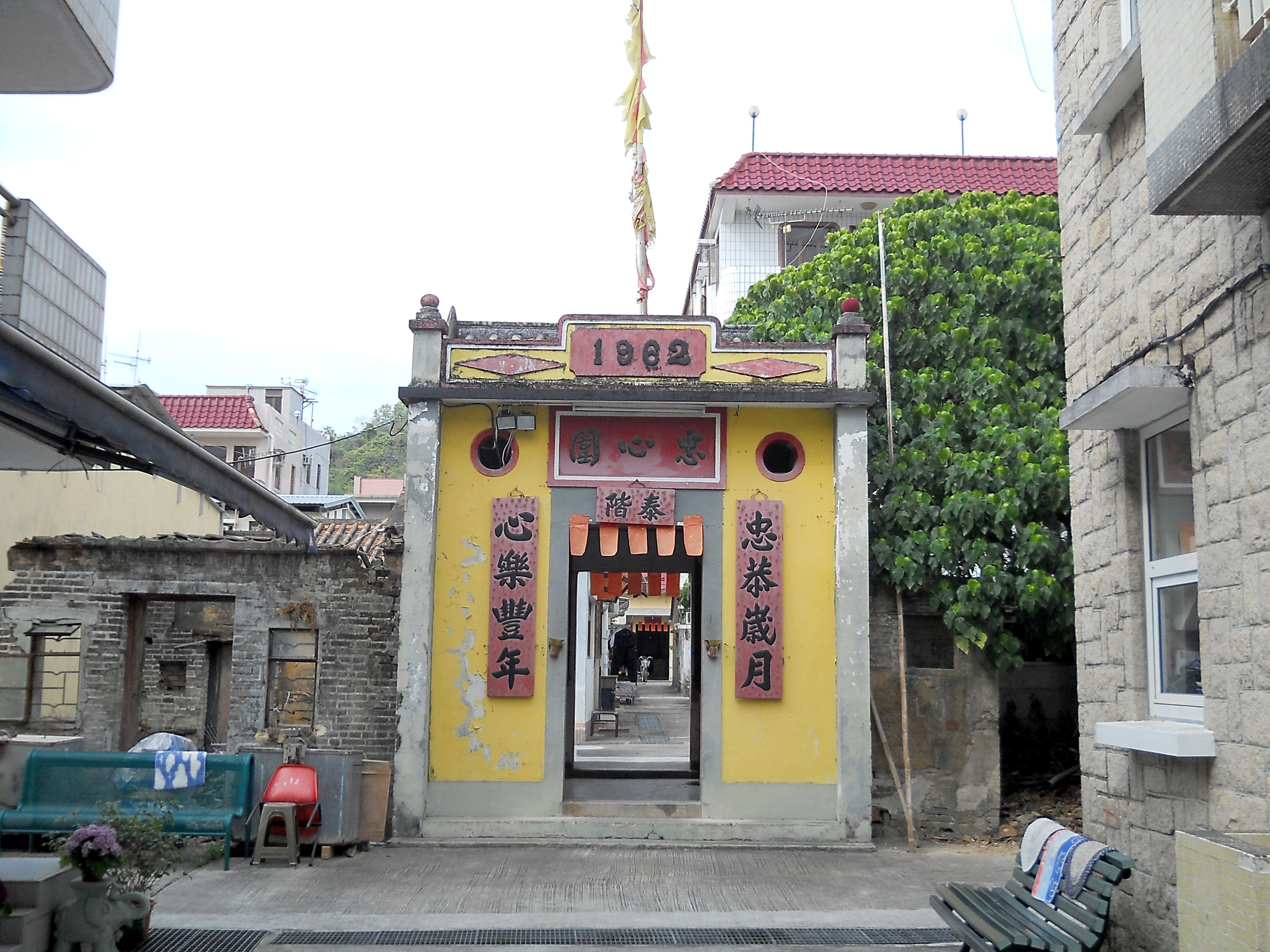
Entrance gate of Chung Sum Wai (Wang Chau).

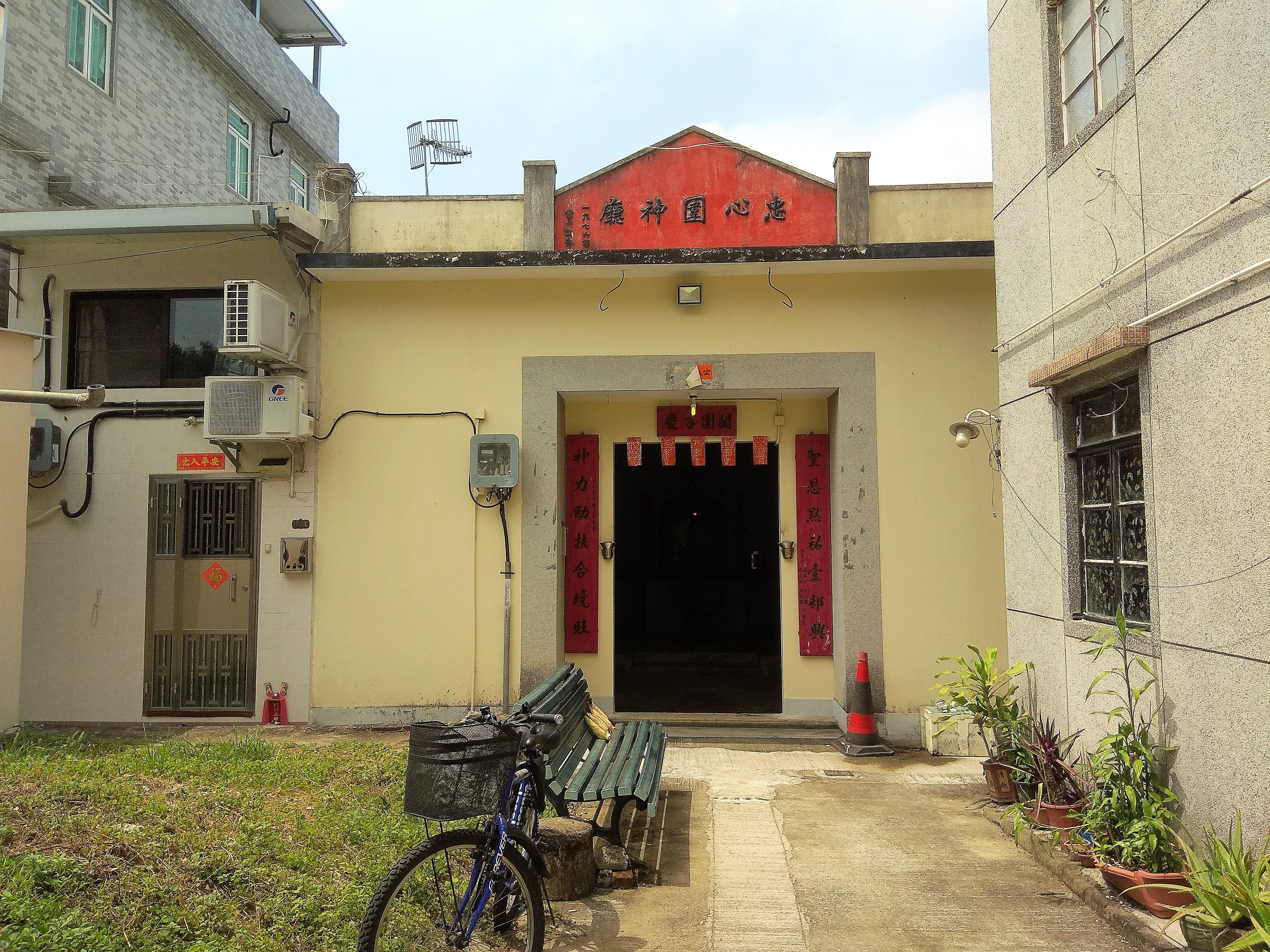
Village shrine of Chung Sum Wai (Wang Chau).

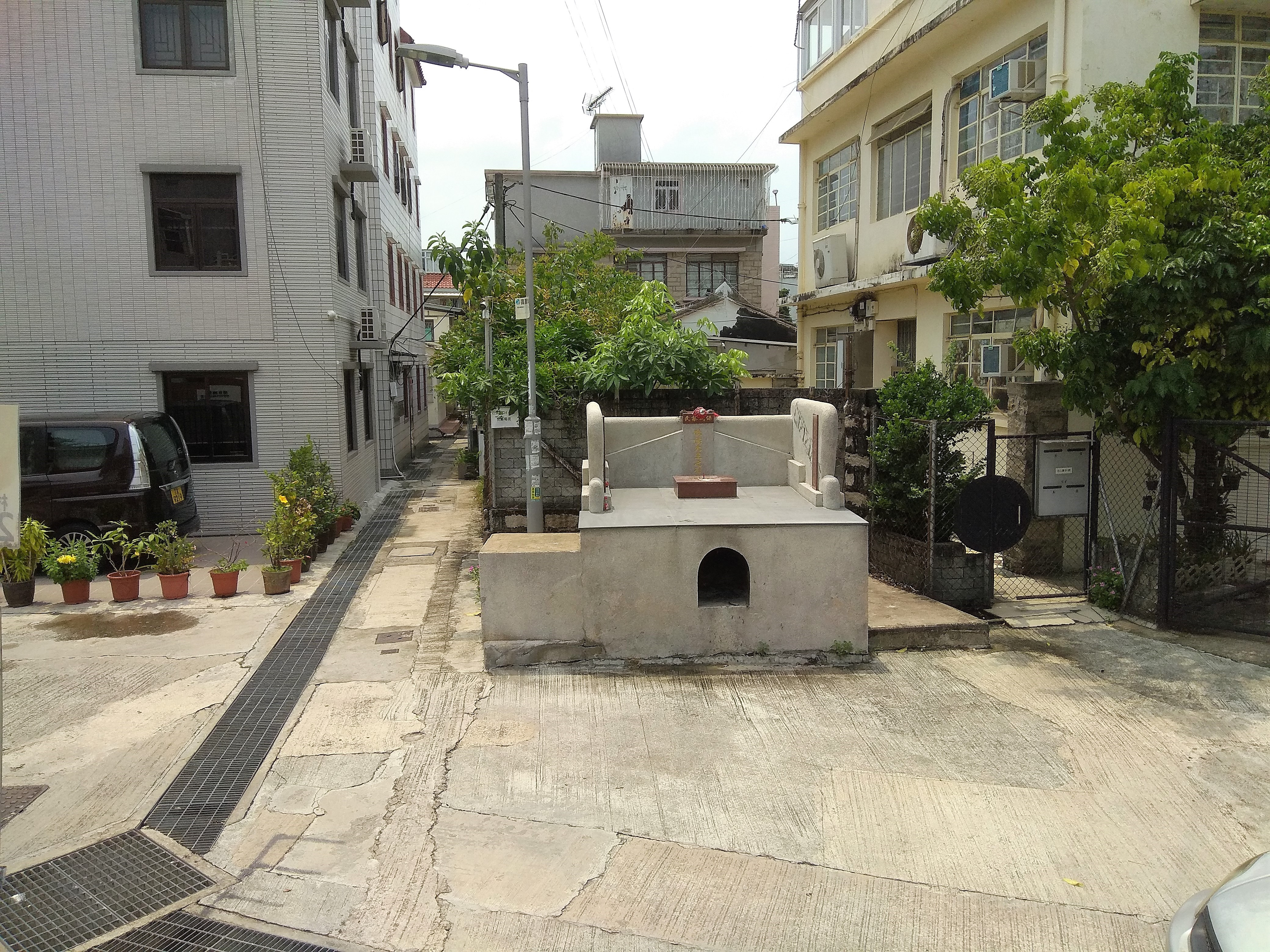
Shrine in Chung Sum Wai (Wang Chau).

Chung Sum Wai (Chinese: 中心圍), sometimes transliterated as Chung Sam Wai, is a Punti walled village in Wang Chau, Yuen Long District, Hong Kong.

== Administration ==
Chung Sum Wai is a recognized village under the New Territories Small House Policy. It is one of the 37 villages represented within the Ping Shan Rural Committee. For electoral purposes, Chung Sum Wai is part of the Ping Shan North constituency, which was formerly represented by Young Ka-on until September 2021.

== See also ==
- Walled villages of Hong Kong
- I Shing Temple
