= Tung Tau Wai =

Village in Wang Chau, Yuen Long District, Hong Kong

Coordinates: 22.45371°N 114.027667°E

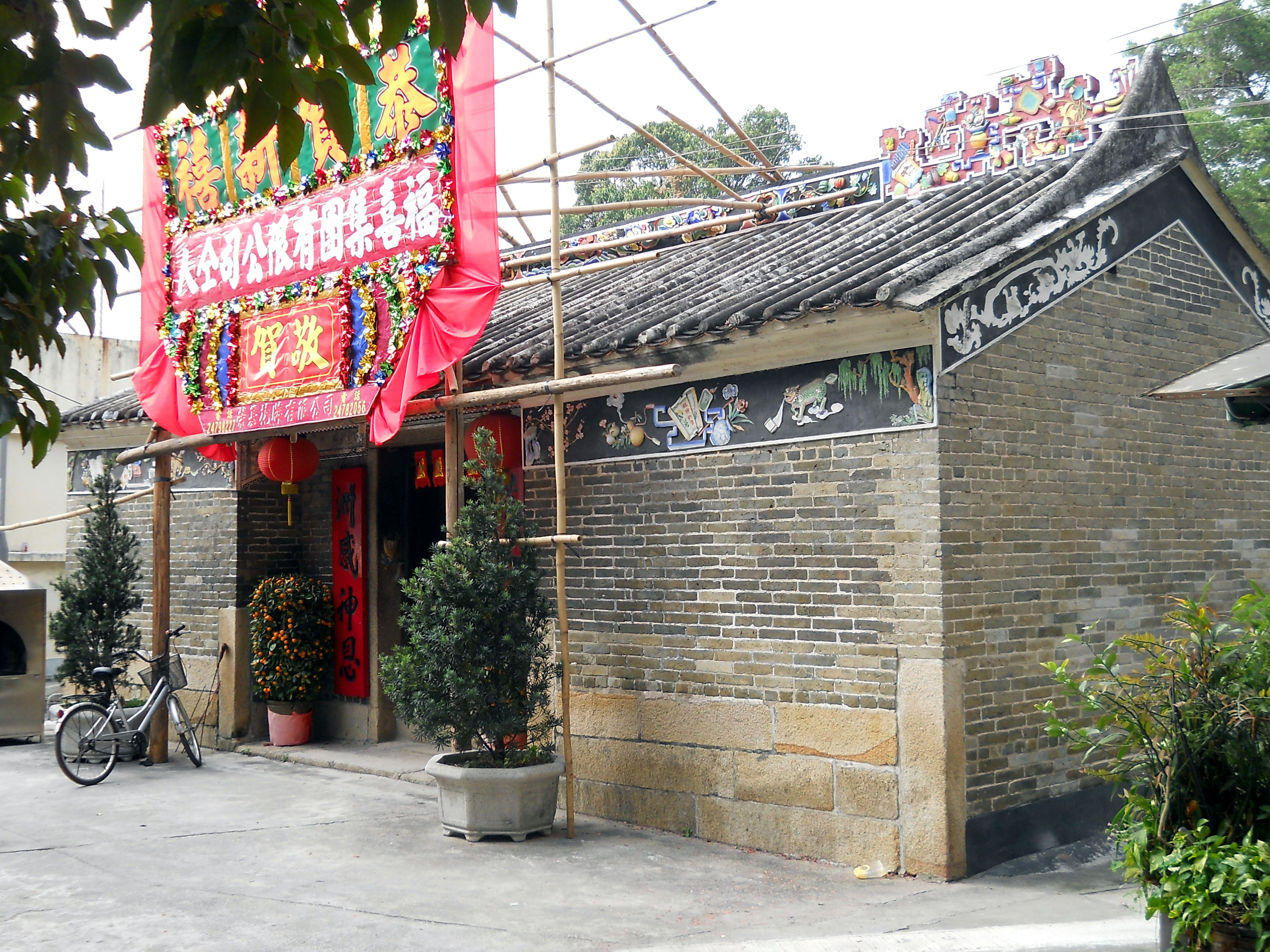
I Shing Temple in Tung Tau Wai.

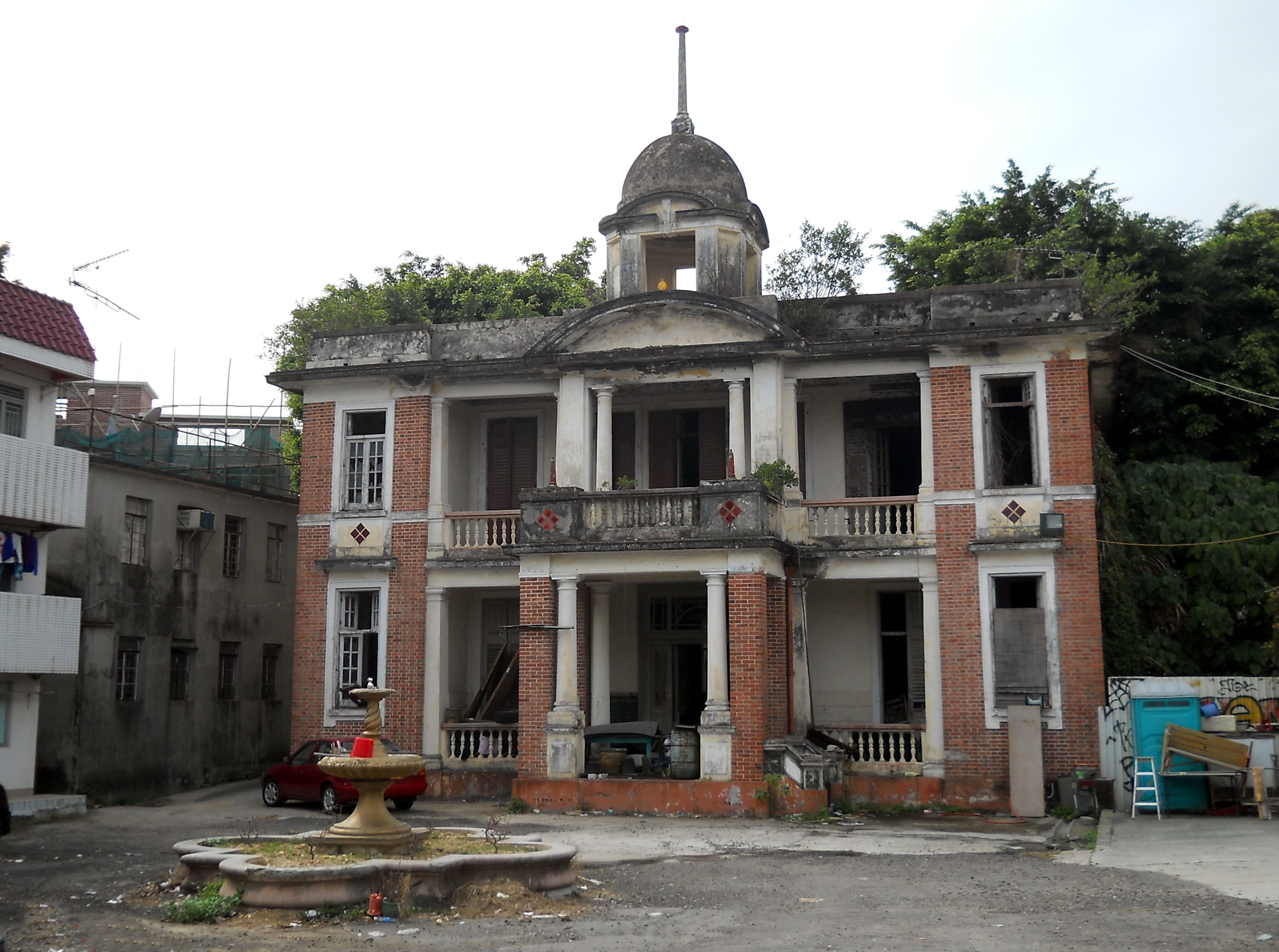
Yu Yuen in Tung Tau Wai.

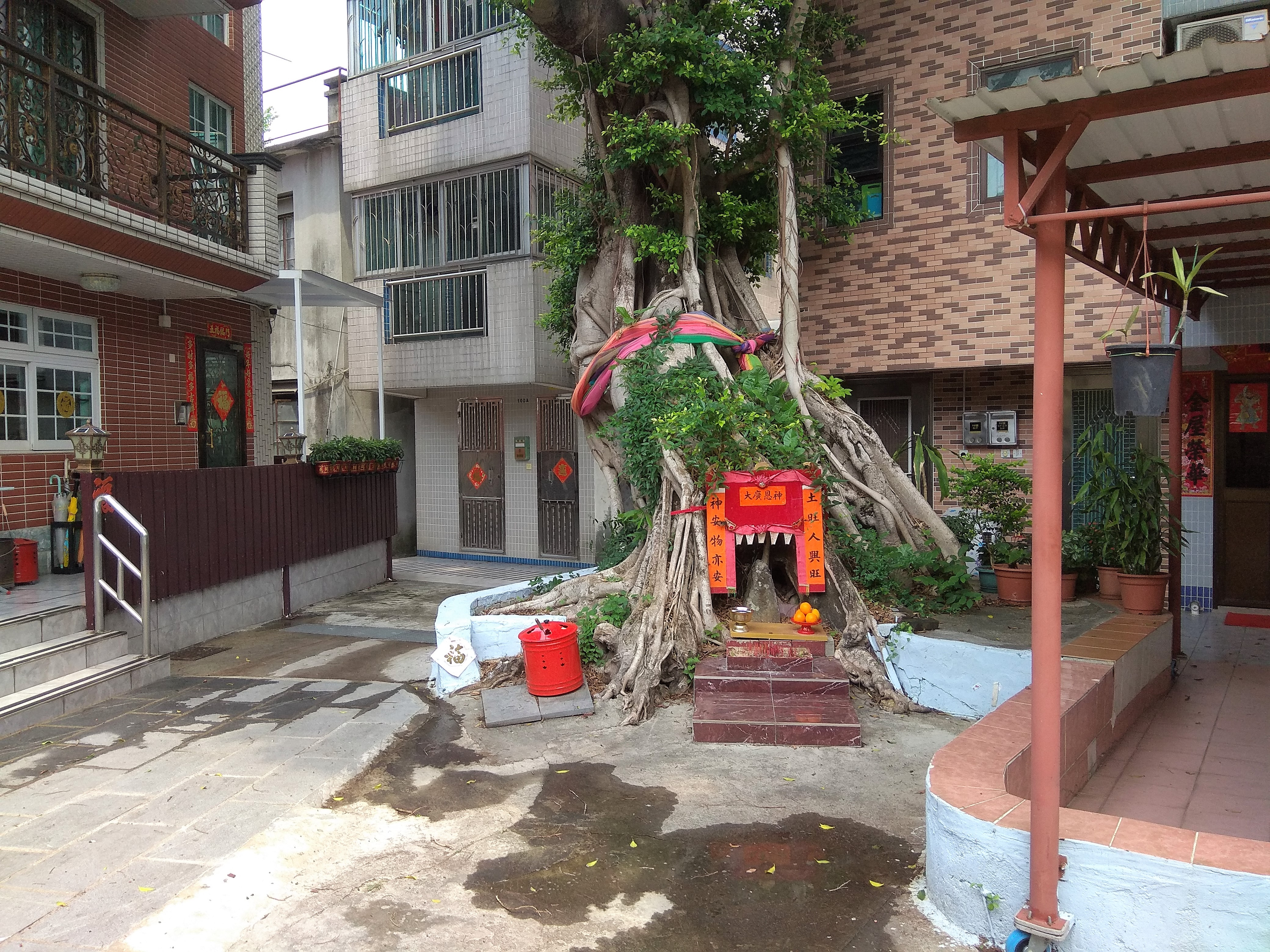
Shrine in Tung Tau Wai.

Tung Tau Wai (Chinese: 東頭圍; lit. 'East End Wai') or Wang Chau Tung Tau Wai (橫洲東頭圍), is a village in Wang Chau, Yuen Long District, Hong Kong.

== Administration ==
Tung Tau Wai (referred to as 'Tung Tau Tsuen' in this context) is a recognized village under the New Territories Small House Policy. Tung Tau Wai is one of the 37 villages represented within the Ping Shan Rural Committee. For electoral purposes, Tung Tau Wai is part of the Ping Shan North constituency.

== Features ==
I Shing Temple or I Shing Kung (二聖宮) is a temple in Tung Tau Wai. Built in 1718, it is dedicated to Hung Shing and Che Kung. It was declared a monument in 1996.

Yu Yuen (娛苑) is the largest house in Tung Tau Wai. Built in 1927 as a summer villa by Tsoi Po-tin (蔡寶田) (1872-1944), a businessman born in the village, it was the private residence of the Tsoi family until 1990. The building was featured in the 1984 film Hong Kong 1941. It is listed as a Grade II historic building.

Tung Tau Wai San Tsuen (東頭圍新村; 'Tung Tau Wai New Village') is a village adjacent to Tung Tau Wai, to its northeast.
