= Sai Tau Wai =

Village of Hong Kong

Coordinates: 22.452931°N 114.025916°E

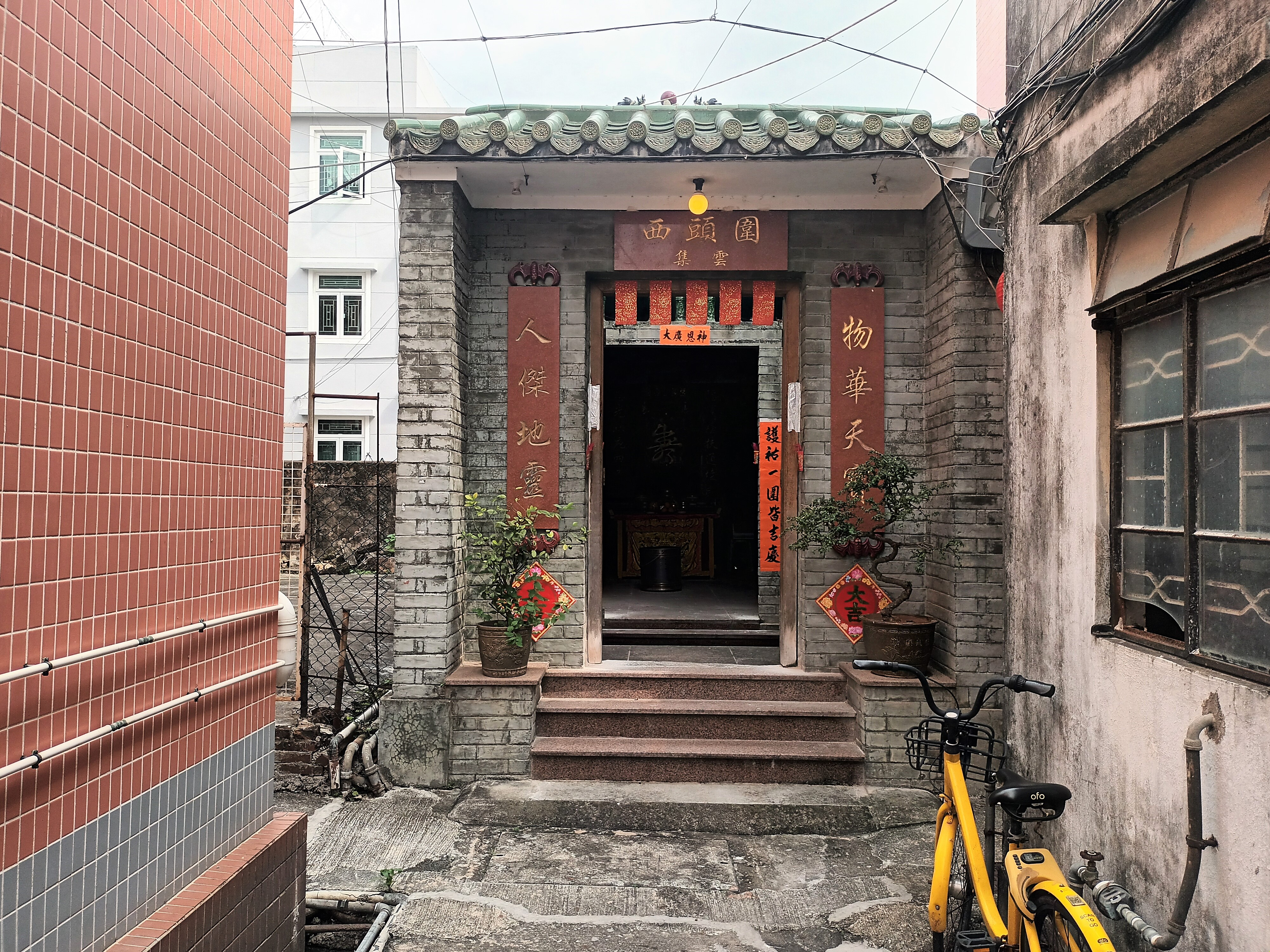
Village shrine of Sai Tau Wai.

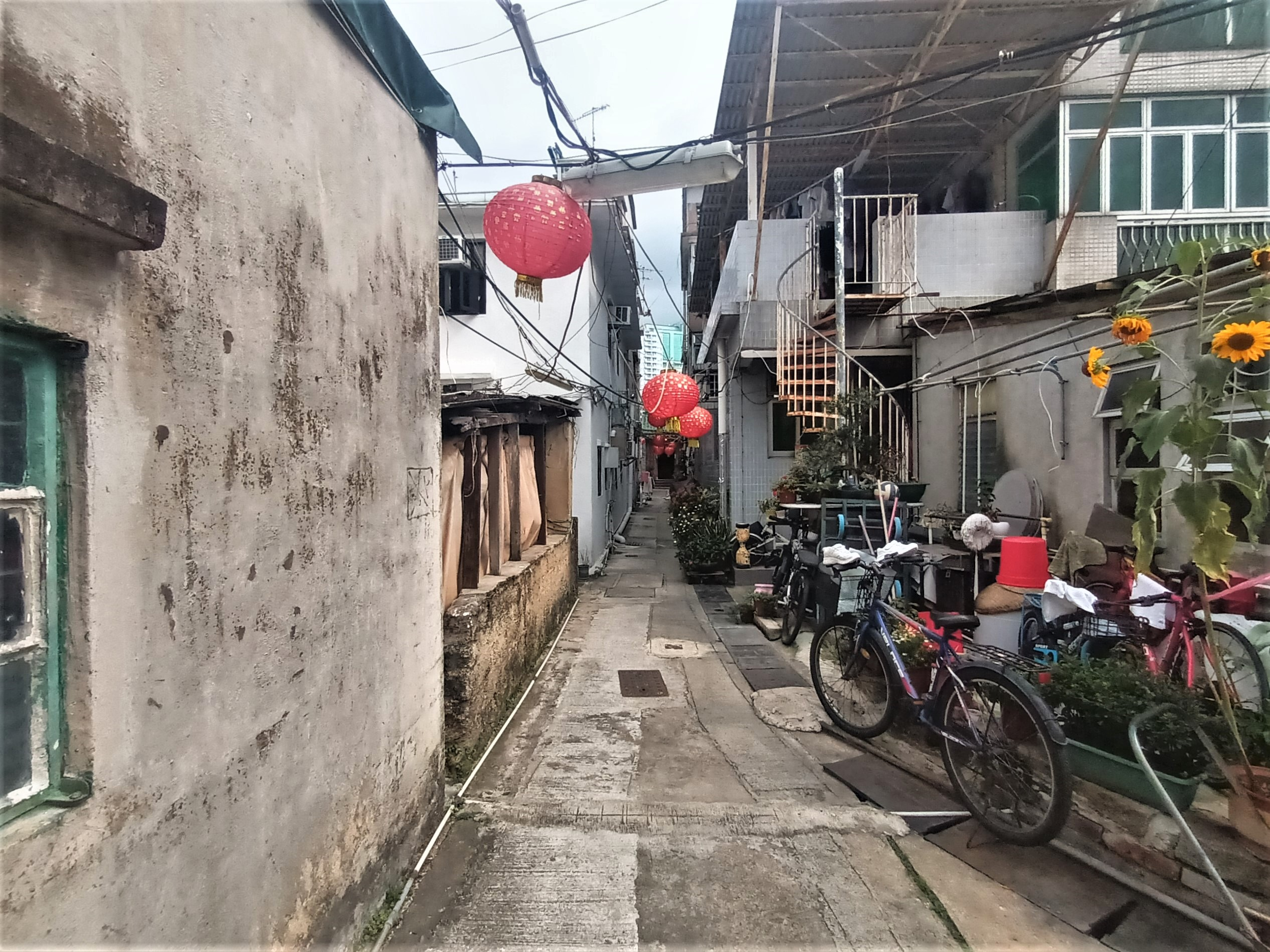
Alley leading to the village shrine of Sai Tau Wai.

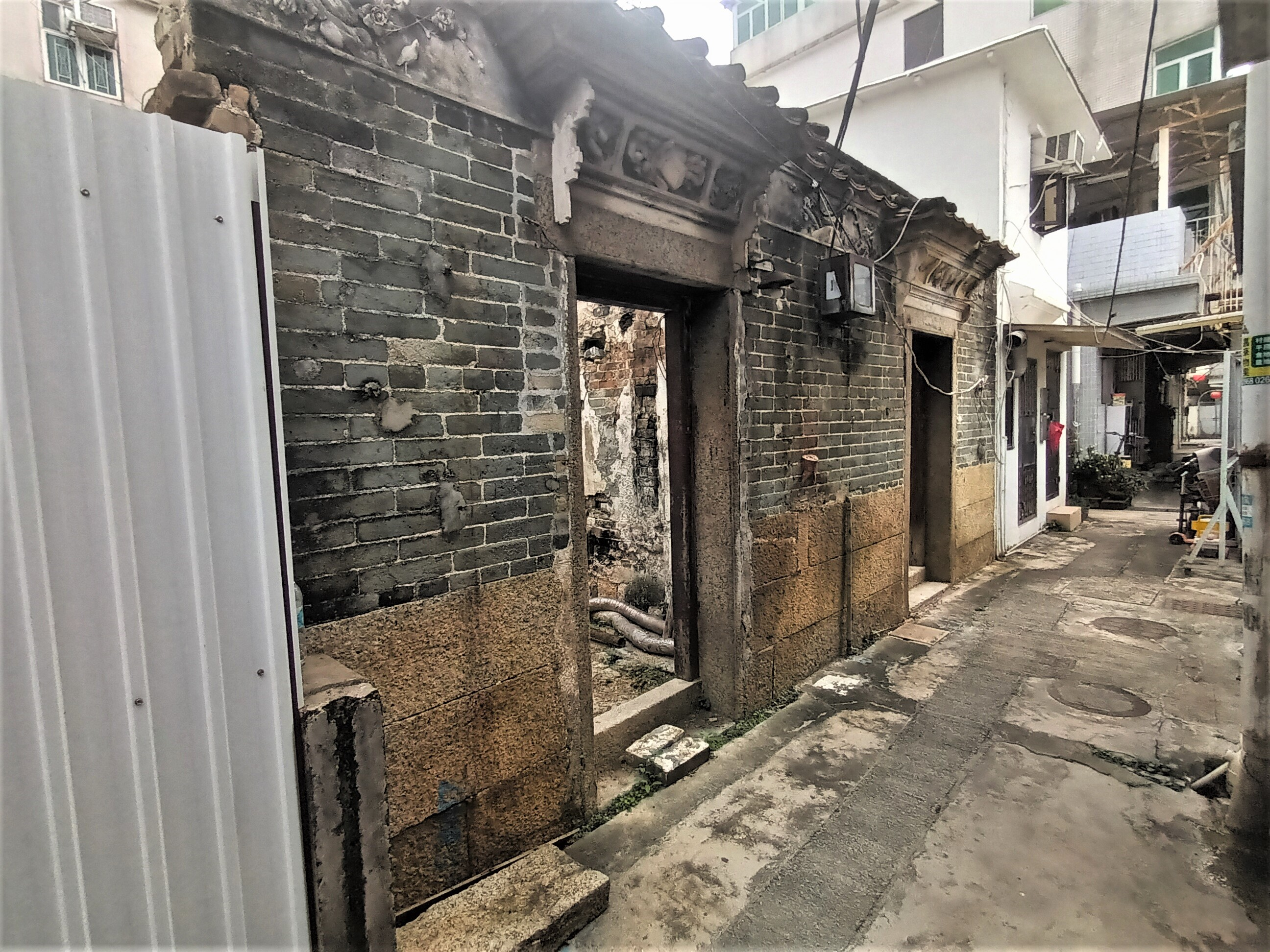
Old houses Nos. 5 and 7A in Sai Tau Wai.

Sai Tau Wai (Chinese: 西頭圍; Cantonese Yale: sāai tàuh wàai; lit. 'West End Wai') is a village in Wang Chau, Yuen Long District, Hong Kong. It may have been a walled village in the past, although it is not confirmed.

== Recognised status ==
Sai Tau Wai is a recognised village under the New Territories Small House Policy. It is one of the 37 villages represented within the Ping Shan Rural Committee. For electoral purposes, Sai Tau Wai is part of the Ping Shan North constituency.

== History ==
Sai Tau Wai was historically a Punti village.

== Features ==
There is a village shrine in Sai Tau Wai.

The historic row of houses Nos. 4, 5 and 7A has been listed as Grade III historic buildings. As of 2023, No. 4 had been demolished and the corner house of 7A had been demolished and rebuilt.

== See also ==
- I Shing Temple
- Walled villages of Hong Kong
