= I Shing Temple =

Temple in Hong Kong, China

Coordinates: 22.45435°N 114.02778°E

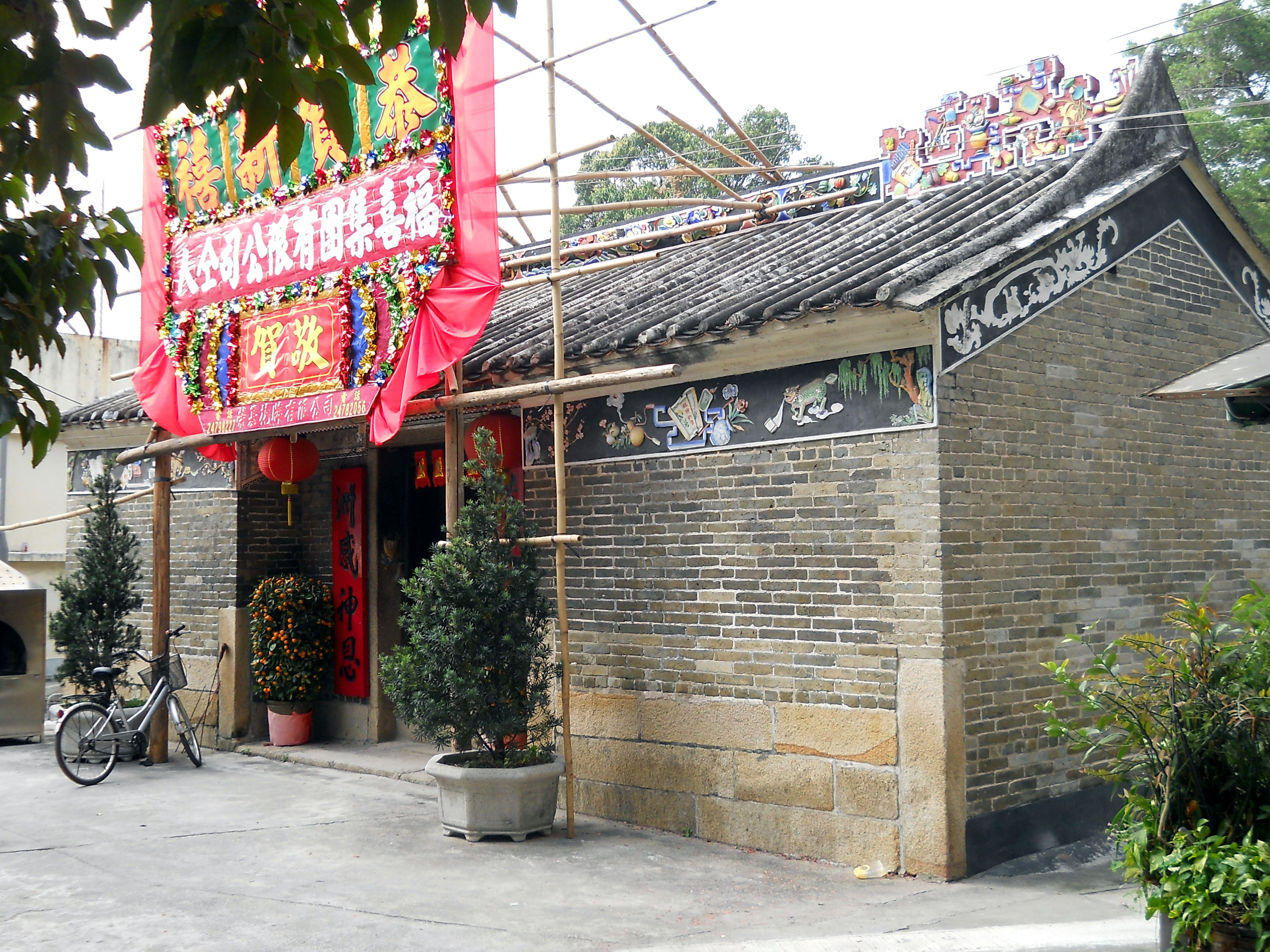
I Shing Temple

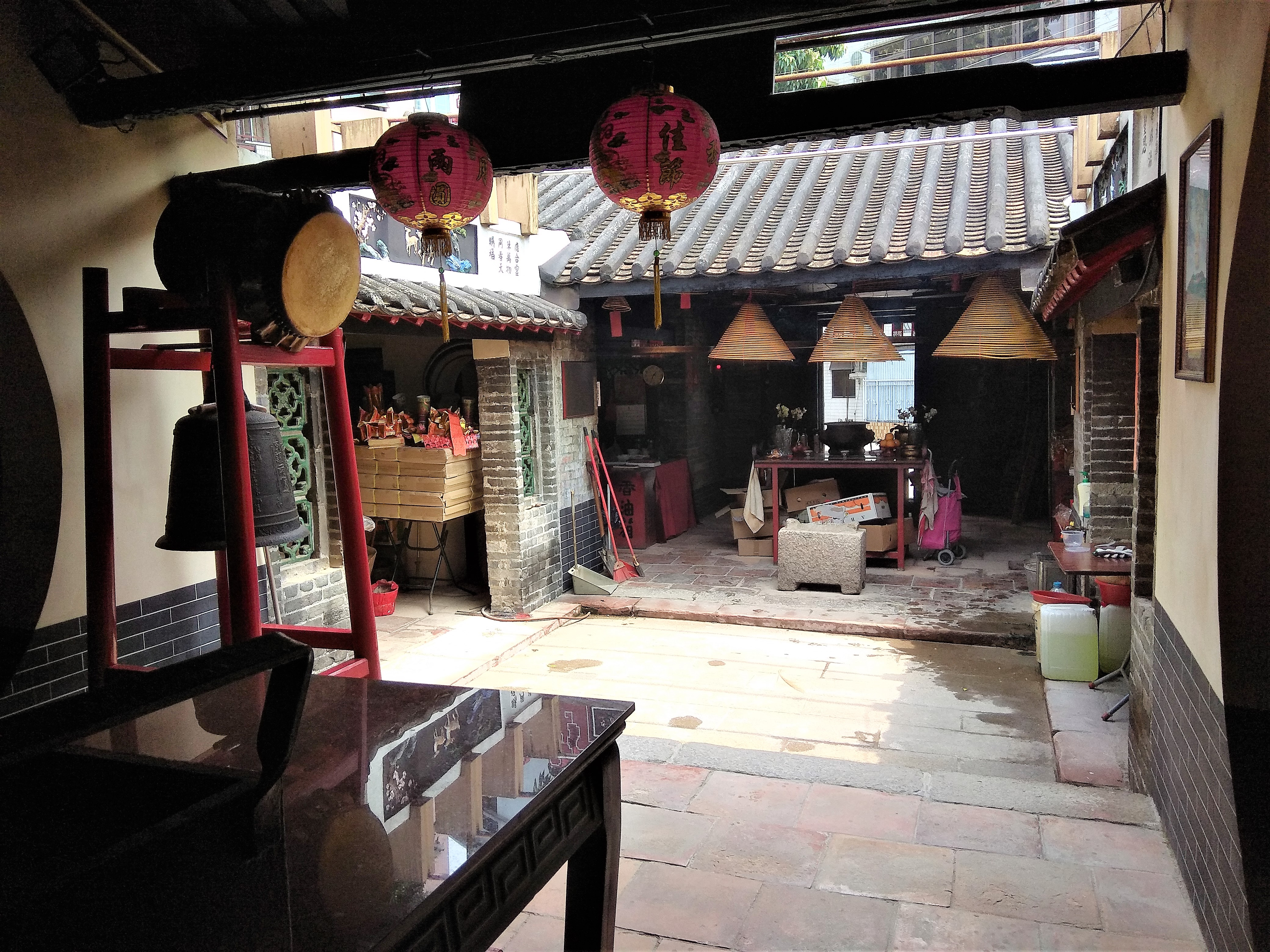
Interior of I Shing Temple

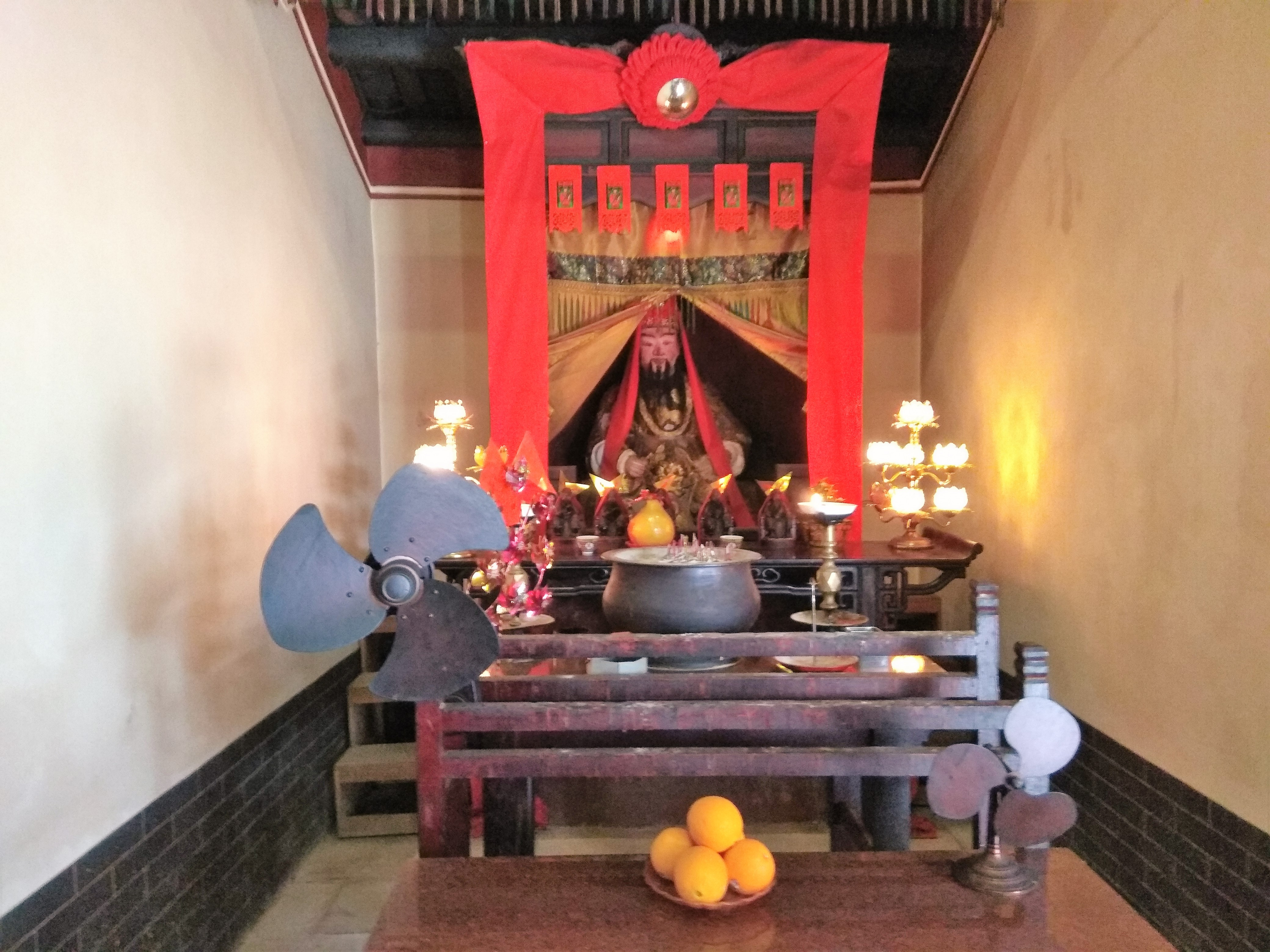
Che Kung altar with pinwheels in I Shing Temple.

I Shing Temple or I Shing Kung (Chinese: 二聖宮; lit. 'temple of two gods') is a temple in Tung Tau Wai, Wang Chau, Yuen Long District, Hong Kong. It is dedicated to Hung Shing and Che Kung. The temple was built in 1718 by the residents of six villages of Wang Chau: Sai Tau Wai, Tung Tau Wai, Lam Uk Tsuen, Chung Sum Wai, Fuk Hing Tsuen and Yeung Uk Tsuen. A full restoration of the temple was undertaken by the Architectural Services Department in 1996. It was declared a monument the same year.
