= Che Kung =

Southern Song general (1235–1330)

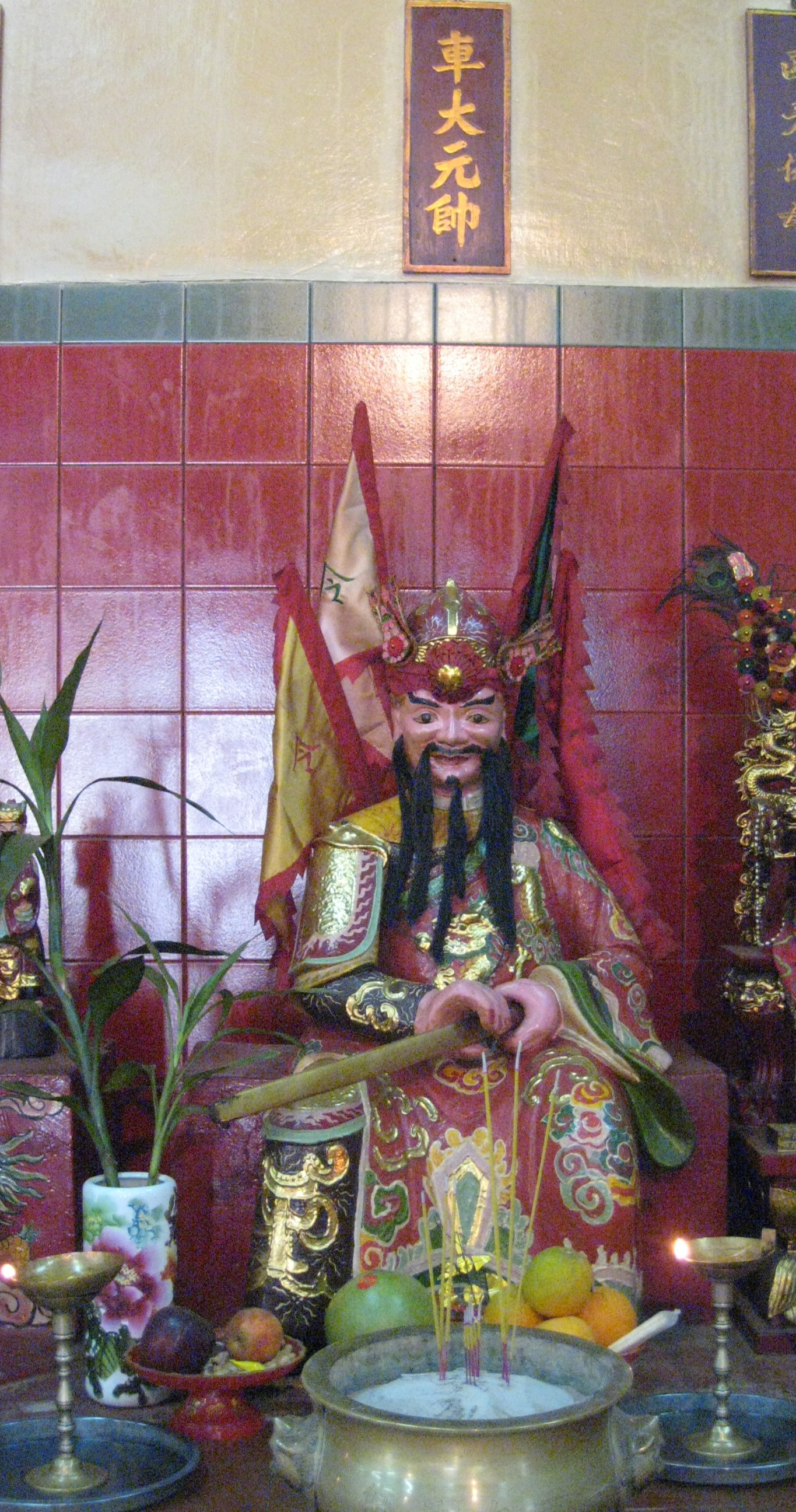
Statue of Che Kung inside the Tin Hau temple at Stanley, Hong Kong

Che Kung (Note: Chinese: 車公; pinyin: Chēgōng; lit. 'Lord Che') (2 January 1235 – 30 December 1330), also known as Che Da Yuan Shuai, (Note: 車大元帥; 'Che', 'the Great Warrior') was originally a military commander of the Southern Song dynasty (1127–1279), who, according to lore, had supreme power to suppress rebellion and was renowned for his loyalty to the emperor. He was also famous for his power to suppress plagues and his skill in medicine. He is believed by some worshipers to have been involved in the attempt to keep the Song state alive by bringing Prince Ping and his brother to the south. He is now considered the God of Protection.

== Life ==
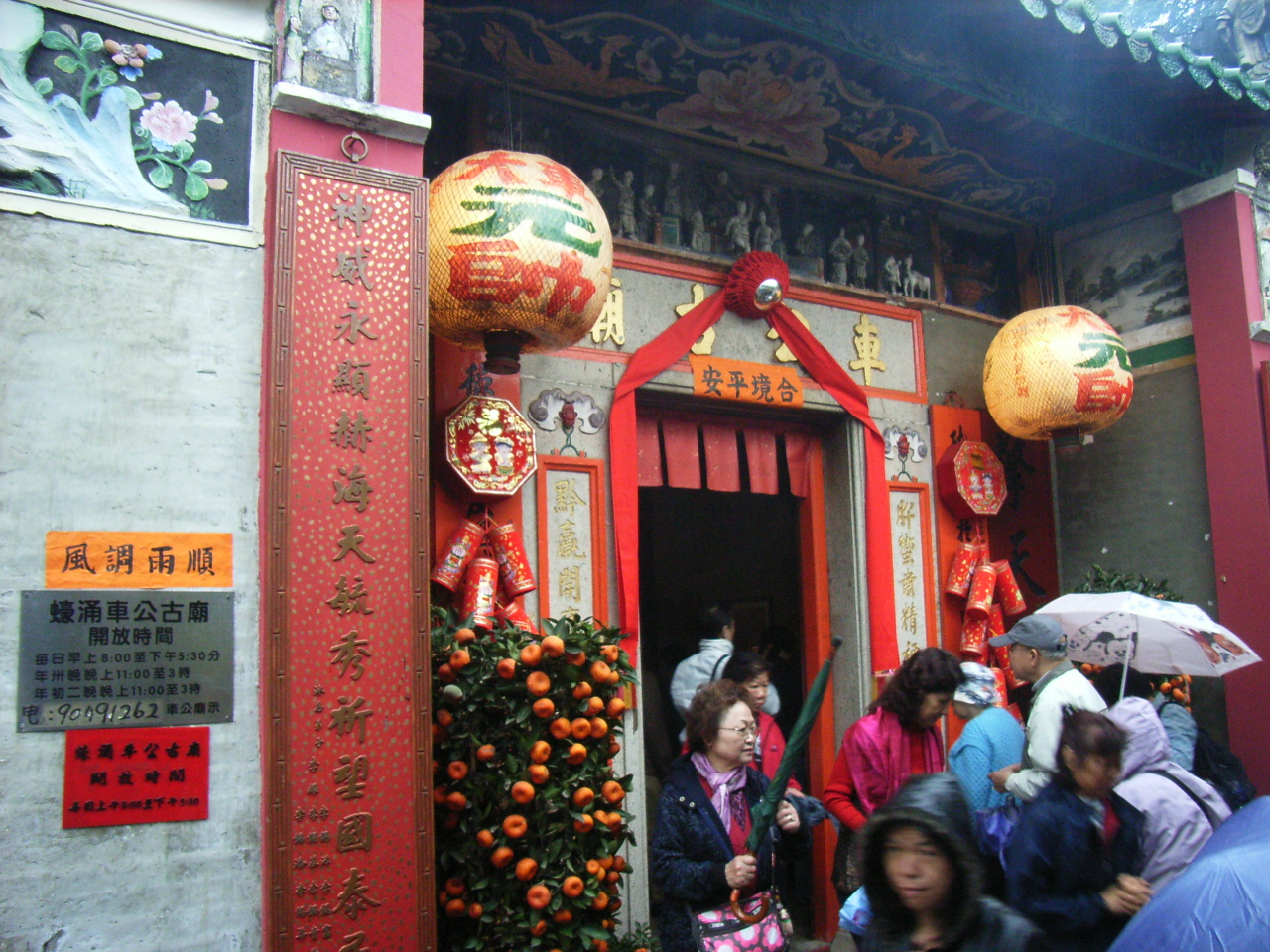
A Che Kung Temple in Ho Chung, Sai Kung, Hong Kong

Che Kung was a native of Nanchang, in Jiangxi Province of China. As a military commander, he saved the southern regions of China from destruction and disorder. Also, he appeared in many villagers' dreams who were suffering from a plague at that time. After the plague was over, the villagers believed that Che Kung had miraculously saved them from the terrible plague. Taoists regarded him as a deity because of his miracles and blessings. Inside a temple of Che Kung, pinwheels can always be found next to his effigy. It is believed that the one who rotates the pinwheel at a certain direction can receive good luck. The Birthday of Che Kung is the second day of Chinese New Year, though often celebrated on the third.

== See also ==
- The Birthday of Che Kung: a celebration dedicated to Che Kung
- Che Kung Miu: temples dedicated to Che Kung (located in Sha Tin & Sai Kung)
- I Shing Temple, dedicated to Hung Shing and Che Kung
- Hong Kong Government Lunar New Year kau chim tradition
