= Ping Shan Central (constituency) =

- Elected constituency for the Yuen Long District Council
- Boundary of Ping Shan Central in Yuen Long District
- District: Yuen Long District
- Legislative Council constituency: New Territories North
- Population: 15,036 (2019)
- Electorate: 7,051 (2019)

Current constituency
- Created: 2015
- Number of members: One
- Member: Vacant
- Created from: Ping Shan North; Ping Shan South

Ping Shan Central is one of the 39 constituencies in the Yuen Long District of Hong Kong.

The constituency returns one district councillor to the Yuen Long District Council, with an election every four years.

Ping Shan Central constituency is loosely based on central part of Ping Shan with estimated population of 15,036.

== Councillors represented ==
Election	Member	Party
2015	Tang Hing-ip	Nonpartisan
2019	Felix Cheung Chi-yeung→Vacant	Nonpartisan

== Election results ==
=== 2010s ===
Yuen Long District Council Election, 2019: Ping Shan Central
Party	Candidate	Votes	%	±%
Nonpartisan	Felix Cheung Chi-yeung	2,479	51.94	
Nonpartisan	Tang Tat-sin	2,294	48.06	
Majority		185	3.08	
Turnout		4,789	67.96	
Nonpartisan gain from Nonpartisan		Swing		

Yuen Long District Council Election, 2015: Ping Shan Central
Party	Candidate	Votes	%	±%
Nonpartisan	Tang Hing-ip	Uncontested		
Nonpartisan win (new seat)				
