= Ping Shan North (constituency) =

- Elected constituency for the Yuen Long District Council
- Boundary of Ping Shan North in Yuen Long District
- District: Yuen Long
- Legislative Council constituency: New Territories North
- Population: 14,237 (2019)
- Electorate: 6,419 (2019)

Current constituency
- Created: 1991
- Number of members: One
- Member: Vacant

Ping Shan North (Chinese: 屏山北) is one of the 39 constituencies in the Yuen Long District of Hong Kong.

The constituency returns one district councillor to the Yuen Long District Council, with an election every four years. Ping Shan North constituency is loosely based on northern part of Ping Shan with estimated population of 14,237.

== Councillors represented ==
| Election | Member | Party |
|---|---|---|
| 1991 | Yeung Siu-hong | Nonpartisan |
| 1994 | Tang Hing-ip | Nonpartisan |
| 2015 | Young Ka-on→Vacant | Nonpartisan |

== Election results ==
=== 2010s ===
Yuen Long District Council Election, 2019: Ping Shan North
| Party | Candidate | Votes | % | ±% |
|---|---|---|---|---|
| Nonpartisan | Young Ka-on | 2,221 | 50.02 | |
| Nonpartisan | Law Ting-fai | 2,219 | 49.98 | |
| Majority | | 2 | 0.04 | |
| Turnout | | 4,460 | 69.55 | |
| Nonpartisan hold | | Swing | | |
