= Yuen Long (disambiguation) =

Yuen Long (Chinese: 元朗) may refer to:

- Yuen Long, for the area in Hong Kong
- Yuen Long District, for the district in Hong Kong
- Yuen Long District Council, the district council for the Yuen Long District, Hong Kong
- Yuen Long FC, a Hong Kong professional football club
- Yuen Long Highway, an expressway part of Hong Kong Route 9 (New Territories Circular Road)
- Yuen Long Industrial Estate, an industrial estate in Yuen Long, Hong Kong
- Yuen Long Kau Hui, for the old market in Yuen Long, Hong Kong
- Yuen Long New Town, for the new town in Yuen Long, Hong Kong
- Yuen Long Park, a park in Yuen Long, Hong Kong
- Yuen Long Plain, for the plain in Hong Kong
- Yuen Long Stadium, a multi-purpose stadium in Yuen Long, Hong Kong
- Yuen Long station, the Hong Kong MTR station called Yuen Long
- Yuen Long stop, the Hong Kong LRT stop called Yuen Long
- Yuen Long Town, for the central town of Yuen Long, Hong Kong
- 2019 Yuen Long attack, for an incident that occurred during the 2019 Hong Kong anti-extradition bill protests
