= List of towns in Hong Kong =

The following is an incomplete list of urban settlements, towns, new towns (satellite towns) in Hong Kong.

While the Government of Hong Kong is unitary and Hong Kong law does not define cities and towns as subsidiary administrative units, the geographical limits of the City of Victoria, Kowloon and New Kowloon are defined in law. None of these three areas have administrative authorities separate from the Special Administrative Region. Administratively, Hong Kong is divided into districts, the boundaries of which are drawn according to mountains, coastlines and roads, and do not coincide with the natural extents of any urbanised areas.

== Major urban settlements ==
Settlement	Location
Victoria City (Hong Kong Island North Shore)	part of Central and Western, part of Wan Chai, Kennedy Town, and part of Eastern
Kowloon including New Kowloon	Yau Tsim Mong, Sham Shui Po, Kowloon City, Wong Tai Sin and Kwun Tong

== New towns ==
Cities	District	Year started developing
Tsuen Wan (Tsuen Wan, Kwai Chung and Tsing Yi)	Tsuen Wan and Kwai Tsing	1950s
Sha Tin	Sha Tin	1970s
Tuen Mun New Town	Tuen Mun	1970s
Tai Po	Tai Po	early 1980s
Yuen Long	Yuen Long	early 1980s
Fanling-Sheung Shui	North	mid-1980s
Ma On Shan	Sha Tin	mid-1980s
Tseung Kwan O New Town	Sai Kung	late 1980s
Tin Shui Wai	Yuen Long	early 1990s
North Lantau (Tung Chung and Tai Ho)	Islands	1994

== Towns ==
Towns	Location
Aberdeen	Southern
Cheung Chau	Islands
Discovery Bay	Islands
Jardine's Lookout	Wan Chai
Ha Tsuen	Yuen Long
Kam Tin	Yuen Long
Kwun Tong	Kwun Tong
Kwu Tung	North
Lau Fau Shan	Tuen Mun
Lei Yue Mun	Kwun Tong
Luen Wo Hui	North
Ma Wan	Islands
Mui Wo (Silvermine Bay)	Islands
Ping Shan	Yuen Long
Peng Chau	Islands
Sai Kung	Sai Kung
San Tin	Yuen Long
Sha Tau Kok	North
Sham Tseng	Tsuen Wan
Shek O	Southern
Sok Kwu Wan	Islands
Stanley	Southern
Tai O	Islands
Yuen Long Town	Yuen Long
Yung Shue Wan	Islands

== Largest urban agglomerations ==
1. Kowloon - 2,019,500
2. Northern Hong Kong Island - 992,900
3. Tsuen Wan New Town - 801,800
4. Kwun Tong - 660,000
5. Sha Tin New Town - 630,000
6. Tuen Mun New Town - 470,900
7. Tseung Kwan O New Town - 344,500
8. Aberdeen - 275,100
9. Tai Po New Town - 274,000
10. Tin Shui Wai New Town - 268,800
11. Fanling-Sheung Shui New Town - 244,700
12. Yuen Long New Town - 141,900
13. North Lantau New Town - 71,900

== See also ==
- Districts of Hong Kong
- List of largest cities
- List of places in Hong Kong
- List of streets and roads in Hong Kong
- List of villages in Hong Kong
