= Easyship =

Global Shipping Software & Technology Company

- Type: Private
- Industry: Shipping E-Commerce Technology Logistics
- Founded: 2014
- Founders: Tommaso Tamburnotti, Augustin Ceyrac, Paul Lugagne-Delpon
- Headquarters: New York City
- Number of locations: 7 offices (2026)
- Area served: United States; Canada; United Kingdom; Australia; Hong Kong; Singapore; Netherlands; Germany; France; Italy; Belgium; Spain
- Website: www.easyship.com

Easyship is a multi-carrier shipping software and logistics API platform that connects eCommerce merchants, marketplace sellers and enterprise brands to hundreds of couriers and shipping services worldwide.

The free shipping aggregator allows individuals and businesses to compare rates and find the cheapest way to ship a package with pre-negotiated volume discounts. Users can buy and print shipping labels, schedule carrier pickups, track shipments, calculate cross-border tax and duty fees, manage returns and add shipping insurance.

Easyship was launched in December 2014 in Hong Kong before expanding to Singapore in November 2016. It entered the North American market in the United States and Canada in July 2017. Today, Easyship operates internationally across the Americas, Europe and the Asia-Pacific region with offices in New York, London, Toronto, Bangalore, Taiwan, Melbourne and Hong Kong.

== Company history ==
Easyship was founded in 2014 by Tommaso Tamburnotti, Augustin Ceyrac, and Paul Lugagne Delpon to address the challenges of international shipping and simplify fulfillment for eCommerce merchants. It was launched at the Hong Kong Science and Technology Park and expanded to Singapore in late 2016, before relocating its headquarters to the United States in mid-2017.

In 2020, Easyship was accepted into the Shopify Plus Certified App Program (now known as the Shopify Certified Technology Partner Program), recognizing its reliability, scalability, and integration quality for high-volume merchants using Shopify's eCommerce platform. Easyship is also an eBay Shipping and Fulfillment Partner and in 2025 became an Amazon Preferred Multi-Channel Integrator, by integrating Amazon Buy Shipping and Amazon Business order support for Seller Fulfilled Prime (SFP) and Fulfilled By Merchant (FBM) sellers in the US, UK and Europe.

Easyship has built native shipping integrations with Shopify, WooCommerce, eBay, Amazon, Squarespace, BigCommerce, Magento, Adobe, WIX, Walmart, Shein, Temu, Etsy and TikTok Shop, to provide multi-channel shipping support for merchants.

== Product features ==
Easyship's technology platform combines both an integrated shipping software dashboard and an application programming interface (API), allowing eCommerce merchants and developers to manage parcel shipping services across multiple carriers like UPS, FedEx and DHL Express and postal providers like USPS, Canada Post, Royal Mail and Australia Post. Core features include:

- Multi-carrier rate comparison across hundreds of courier services and discounts, including domestic, international and express delivery options.
- Shipping label generation, including batch label printing and automation flows for high-volume merchants.
- Carrier pickup scheduling, parcel tracking, signature services, and branded tracking updates for confirmed delivery to buyers.
- Cross-border shipping tools, including import tariff, tax and duty calculation, HS code classification, and support for Delivery Duty Paid (DDP) and Delivery Duty Unpaid (DDU) terms.
- Checkout optimizations, including offering calculated rates at checkout based on delivery address and accurate import duty and tax estimates at the time of purchase.
- Address validation and shipping insurance protection to reduce lost and damaged parcels and avoid replacement and reshipping costs for merchants.
- Returns management for domestic and international orders for end-to-end coverage from checkout to delivery and returns.
- Native integrations with eCommerce platforms and marketplaces, including Shopify, WooCommerce, Squarespace, BigCommerce, Magento, Adobe Commerce, Wix, Amazon, eBay, Etsy, Temu, Shein and TikTok Shop.
- Outsourced order fulfillment through a global network of Easyship-owned and third-party warehouses, offered under the Easyship Fulfillment Services brand. This includes pick and pack services, storage, packaging, shipping and fulfillment.

Easyship is a free shipping software platform with per-shipment fees as outlined in the transparent shipping quote comparison tool. The platform also offers tiered paid plans with additional features and volume limits for professional sellers.

== Shipping API and MCP server ==
In April 2026, Easyship released a Model Context Protocol (MCP) server, an open standard introduced by Anthropic in late 2024 that allows AI assistants and autonomous agents to interact with software services like Easyship. Through the Easyship MCP server, AI clients can request and compare shipping rates, generate labels, schedule carrier pickups, calculate import taxes and duties, retrieve tracking information and pull shipping analytics data using natural language prompts. The server is published on the public MCP registry and is compatible with all AI platforms that support the protocol, including Claude, ChatGPT, Cursor and Gemini, as well as workflow automation tools such as Zapier, Make and n8n. The MCP release accompanied a broader expansion of Easyship's shipping API, positioning the platform as an infrastructure layer for AI-driven and agentic commerce workflows alongside similar developer tools released by Stripe, PayPal, and Shopify.

== eBay international shipping program ==
Easyship's application programming interface (API) has been used in several shipping and fulfillment services on eBay's global marketplace, including label generation, cross-border compliance and parcel tracking in the US. It has also supported domestic and international shipments in Canada and Australia since 2019. In April 2023, Easyship announced the expansion of its partnership with eBay to support eBay International Shipping, a newly launched program that provides additional protections for eBay sellers. This allowed buyers to access more regional and express shipping solutions for international destinations through eBay's platform.

== Shipping for crowdfunding campaigns ==
Easyship also supports shipping for crowdfunding platforms including Kickstarter and Indiegogo, supporting the delivery of campaign products to project backers all over the world.

Support for AI

== Awards and achievements ==
- "Best Startup In Asia" by TechInAsia (2015)
- "Technology Company of the Year" by ComputerWorld (2017)
- "Easyship announce a US$4M Series A fundraising round" by TechCrunch (2018)
- "Forbes 30 Under 30 for Retail & eCommerce" featuring Augustin Ceyrac & Tommaso Tamburnotti (2018)
- "Gold Stevie Award Winner" by the American Business Awards (2019)
- "Best Web Services and Applications" nominee by Webby Awards (2019)
- "Company of the Year – Transportation" by the International Business Awards (2021)
- "G2 Category Leader: Shipping & Dropshipping" by G2 Crowd (2022, 2023, 2025, 2026)
