= Chiu Lut Sau Memorial Secondary School =

School in Yuen Long, Hong Kong

Coordinates: 22.4424°N 114.0224°E

Chiu Lut Sau Memorial Secondary School (CLSMSS) 趙聿修紀念中學 (趙中)

Location
- No.7 Tai Yuk Road, Yuen Long N.T. Hong Kong

Information
- Type: Co-education
- Motto: Wisdom, Virtue, Honesty and Progress
- Established: 1979
- School district: Yuen Long, Hong Kong
- Category: Government School (EMI)
- Principal: Woo Kit-ching
- Grades: S1 – S6
- Enrollment: approx. 900
- Colour: 明 善 誠 新
- Website: http://web.clsmss.edu.hk

Chiu Lut Sau Memorial Secondary School
- Traditional Chinese: 趙聿修紀念中學
- Simplified Chinese: 赵聿修纪念中学
Transcriptions
Standard Mandarin
- Hanyu Pinyin: Zhào Yùxiū Jìniàn Zhōngxué
Yue: Cantonese
- Jyutping: ziu6 leot6 sau1 gei2 nim6 zung1 hok6

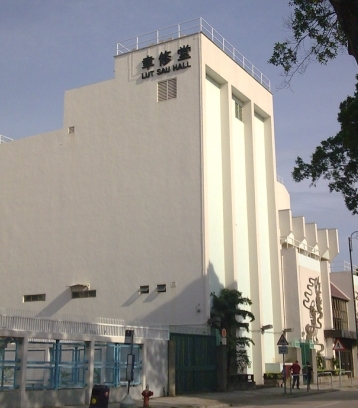
Lut Sau Hall

Chiu Lut Sau Memorial Secondary School (趙聿修紀念中學), or CLSMSS in short, is a secondary school in Yuen Long, Hong Kong. It was founded in 1979. It is a Band 1 school and is one of the 14 Government schools approved for using English as the medium of instruction (EMI) for all levels.

== Principals ==
Name	Year in office
Poon Wai Tong	1979–1982
Wai Hong Chung	1982–1987
Wong Chung Yee	1987–1994
Cheng Lau Yuk King	1994–2005
Lo Choi Yin Fon Margaret	2005–2015
Kong Yik Cheong	2015–2019
Yiu Lee Siu Yuk	2019–2021
Woo Kit-ching	2021- now

== Lut Sau Hall ==
Lut Sau Hall is the official school hall of the school. In the past, it was also used as a local community hall for cultural performances. In early 2000s, the state of community hall was ended after the opening of Yuen Long Theatre near the school. The hall was renovated in 2016.

== Class system ==
Before the New Senior Secondary Curriculum (NSS Curriculum) was imposed in 2012, the school provided both secondary education and matriculation. For Form 1 – 5, there were 5 classes (A – E) in each form. For Form 6 – 7, there were 2 classes (A and S) in each form. 'A' stands for Arts stream while 'S' stands for Science stream.

Currently, there are approximately 150 students in each year from Secondary 1 to Secondary 6 . Students are streamed into 4 classes A, B, C, D according to their academic performance, with A and B being the better classes in junior form (S.1 – S.3). In Senior form, there would be 4 classes A, B, C, D according to the preferences of students in choosing the electives. Remedial lessons are also arranged to give support to less capable students.

== Medium of instruction ==
Except Chinese subjects, cultural subjects and Civic Education and Liberal Studies, English is used in learning and teaching in all subjects.

== Subjects ==
Secondary 1–2: English Language, Chinese Language, Mathematics, Life and Society, Integrated Science, Integrated Humanities, Chinese History, Putonghua, Physical Education, Computer Literacy, Music, Visual Arts, Design and Technology, Home Economics

Secondary 3: English Language, Chinese Language, Mathematics, Life and Society, Physics, Chemistry, Biology, Geography, History, Chinese History, Physical Education, Computer Literacy, Music, Visual Arts

Secondary 4–6:

Core subjects: English Language, Chinese Language, Mathematics, Citizen and Social Development, Physical Education

Electives: Physics, Chemistry, Biology, Chinese History, History, Mathematics Module 2, Business Accounting and Financial Studies, Information and Communications Technology, Chinese Literature, Visual Arts, Music, Geography, Economics

== Students' union ==
A popular election is held every school year in the first school term. All students are eligible to vote. Generally, each student can vote by secret ballot for one proposed cabinet.

Year	Cabinet	President
2007–2008	Speed Up	
2008–2009	鐵三角	
2009–2010	Innovator	
2010–2011	Unique	
2011–2012	Sirius	
2012–2013	Aslan	5E Kwok Shing Hei
2013–2014	Chaser	5A Tam Siu Hin
2014–2015	Vega	5E Chan Wing Tung
2015–2016	Fairy	5E Chow Pak Hei
2016–2017	Luster	5D Lee Pui Ling
2017–2018	Blaze	5A Wan Wai Kong
2018–2019	Hacer	5D Man Tsz Wai
2019–2020	Albus	5D Tse Chun Ming
2020-2021	Cessabit	5D Man Tsz Keung
2021-2022	Aurora	5D Cheung Ching Yiu
2022-2023	-	-
2023-2024	Coeus	5D Lee Tsz Yau
2024-2025	Zenith	5E Wong Hiu Tung
2025-2026	Nebula	5A Hong Kiu
2026-2027	Cetus	5A Tang Tsz Yau

== House system ==
There are four houses, comprising members of all the classes in the school. The houses are named Wisdom, Virtue, Honesty and Progress. The houses compete against each other in the annual Swimming Gala, Athletics Meet, Inter-house Singing Contest and Inter-house Drama Competition.

House colours
Wisdom – Red
Virtue – Yellow
Honesty – Blue
Progress – Green

== Notable alumni ==
- Joe Ma Tak-chung: a famous Hong Kong TVB actor
- Margaret Kan Pui Kin: a Hong Kong artist. She was the winner of Miss Hong Kong 2000 and the representative of Hong Kong of Miss World 2000.
