= Plains of Hong Kong =

There are three plains in Hong Kong, in the northern New Territories. These plains are Yuen Long, Fanling, and Tai Po.

== Yuen Long ==
Yuen Long (Chinese: 元朗, Pinyin: Yuanlang, formerly, Un Long) is an area and town in the northwest of Hong Kong, on the Yuen Long Plain. To its west lie Hung Shui Kiu and Ha Tsuen, to the south Shap Pat Heung and Tai Tong, to the east Au Tau and Kam Tin, and to the north Nam Sang Wai.

== Fanling ==
Fanling, also known as Fan Ling and Fan Leng, is an area in the North District. The name Fanling is a shortened form of Fan Pik Leng (粉壁嶺). Part of Fanling–Sheung Shui New Town, Fanling includes Luen Wo Hui (聯和墟), the marketplace of Fanling before urban development in the area, and Wo Hop Shek (和合石), where an uphill public cemetery is located.

== Tai Po ==
Tai Po (Chinese: 大埔, Pinyin: Dapu) (sometimes written Taipo) refers to the area of the traditional market towns in the area now known as Tai Po Old Market or Tai Po Kau Hui (大埔舊墟) (originally Tai Po Market or Tai Po Town) and the Tai Wo Town (Tai Wo Market) on the other side of the Lam Tsuen River, near the old Tai Po Market station of the Kowloon-Canton Railway British Section, within the Tai Po District. Both towns became part of the Tai Po New Town in the late 1970s and early 1980s. In present-day usage, Tai Po. may refer to the area around the original market towns (that is, Tai Po proper), the new town, or the entire Tai Po District.
