= Virtual Socket Interface Alliance =

Virtual Socket Interface Alliance (VSIA) is a body of SIP (Semiconductor / Silicon intellectual property) standards.

== History ==
VSIA was founded in 1996 and dissolved in 2008, and was an open, international organization of companies such as Mentor Graphics, Cadence Design Systems, Magma Design Automation, ARM Holdings, and Synopsys, from various segments of the SoC (System-on-a-chip) industry.

== Importance of VSIA ==
VSIA's mission was to enhance the productivity of the SoC design community dramatically. VSIA has developed an international standard, the QIP metric (Quality Intellectual Property Metric) for measuring SIP quality and examining the practices used to design, integrate and support the IP. This is important and, to have a measure of the quality, VSIA also works on other issues such as IP protection, IP transfer, IP integration and IP reuse standards (IP hardening is required for easy IP reuse) for Integrated circuit design.

VSIA was founded and driven by Executive Director Stan Baker (1934-2022), a prominent world-wide Electronics Industry Journalist. During the 1990s, Baker and his team including Kathy Rogers, was a driving force behind several electronics industry consortium's that were working to set industry standards to help propel the development of single chip devices, including cell phones.

== Eg. for IP Trading ==
Hong Kong Science and Technology Parks Corporation (HKSTP), which was set up by Hong Kong government, joined VSIA as a member in 2006. HKSTP and Hong Kong University of Science and Technology (HKUST) started to develop a SIP verification and quality measures framework in 2005.

The objective is to develop a technical framework for SIP quality measures and evaluation based on QIP. HKSTP provides QIP services, and a SIP trading platform for different semiconductor vendors, developers, and SIP providers.
