= PieShell =

Crowdfunding website

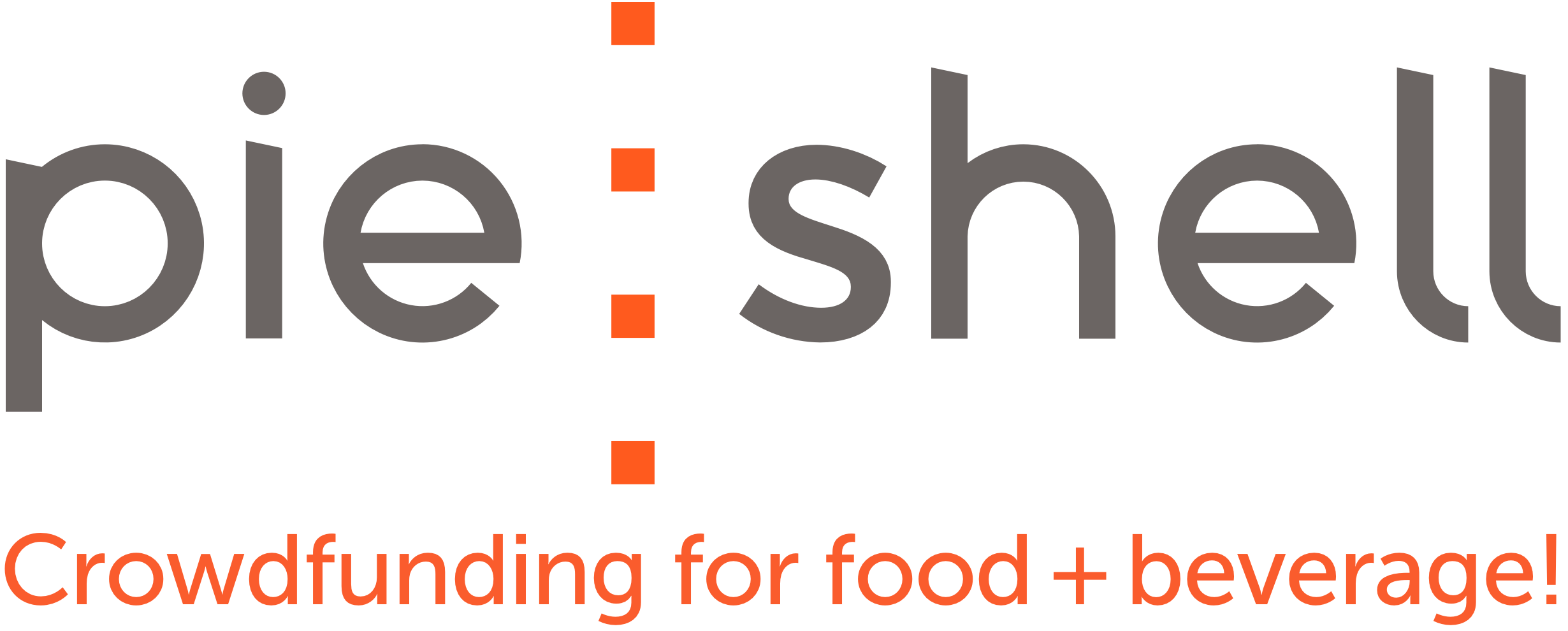
- Industry: Crowdfunding (food and beverage)
- Predecessor: fundafeast
- Founded: July 2015
- Founder: Cheryl Clements
- Headquarters: New York City, United States
- Website: pieshell.com

PieShell was a crowdfunding website for food and beverage start-ups. The company was based in New York City, USA, and was launched by Cheryl Clements in October 2016.

After working as a senior project manager with SAP SE software, Clements identified an unmet need for early stage funding for food and beverage start-ups. In 2014 she launched a food crowdfunding platform called Fund-A-Feast, which she rebranded as "PieShell" in 2016.

The business name "PieShell" was a tribute to her mother's pie business. The site launched with four campaigns that included a hot dog truck and a ketchup product. In mid-2017, PieShell was hosting around 30 campaigns.

PieShell requires anyone wanting to launch a campaign on the site to first pledge to another active campaign; this is to foster a sense of community. A campaign is initially hosted on a private page, and must raise 25% of its fundraising target from people, with whom the people running the campaign have shared the link; once that milestone is reached, the campaign is made visible and open to the public. People who give money can receive rewards from the campaign.

The venture was financed in part by a GoFundMe campaign and initially operated out of a Spacious coworking space. The site made money by keeping 6% of the funds raised in a campaign.
