= Spacious =

Hong Kong online real estate marketplace

Spacious千居
- Headquarters: Hong Kong
- Area served: Asia
- Founder: Asif Ghafoor
- CEO: Asif Ghafoor
- Industry: Real estate
- Website: spacious.hk
- Launched: August 2013

Spacious千居 is an online residential real estate marketplace, connecting buyers and tenants with residential and commercial properties throughout Asia. Spacious was founded in 2013 by Asif Ghafoor, former Goldman Sachs and Standard Chartered Bank development manager, senior IT director and application architect, and was part of Hong Kong Science and Technology Parks Corporation incubator program. Spacious is headquartered in Hong Kong.

== Company history ==
=== Inception ===
Spacious was founded by Asif Ghafoor. As of 2015, the website includes rental listings, service apartments and apartments for sale in Hong Kong, a haunted house database and an affordability feature, where users can search for apartments based on their monthly income.

=== Funding ===
The company raised a $500,000 seed round in early 2014 and received $3 million in June, 2015.
