= Yuen Long New Town =

Coordinates: 22.4626°N 114.0193°E

Yuen Long 元朗
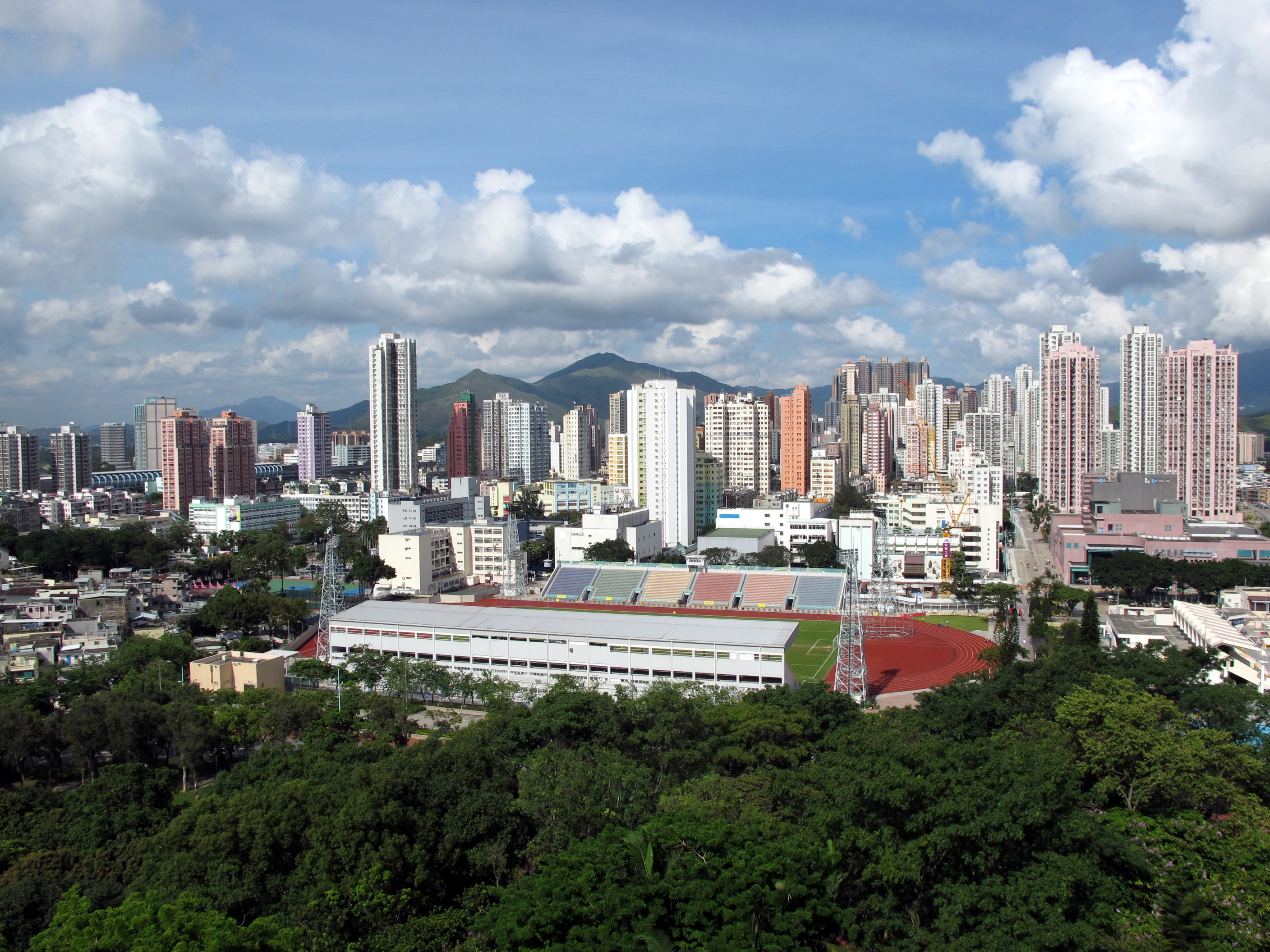
- Nickname: Yuen Long
- Interactive map of Yuen Long
- Special Administrative Region: Hong Kong
- District: Yuen Long District

Area
  - Urban: 11.7 km^{2} (4.5 sq mi)

Population (2021)
  - Urban: 169,921 90.9% Chinese 4.5% South Asian 2.1% Filipino
- Time zone: UTC+8
- Area code: 852
- Website: https://www.districtcouncils.gov.hk/yl/english/welcome/welcome.html

Yuen Long New Town
- Chinese: 元朗新市鎮
Transcriptions
Standard Mandarin
- Hanyu Pinyin: Yuán Lǎng Xīnshìzhèn
Yue: Cantonese
- Yale Romanization: Yùhn lóhng sān síh jan
- Jyutping: Jyun4 long5 san1 si5 zan3

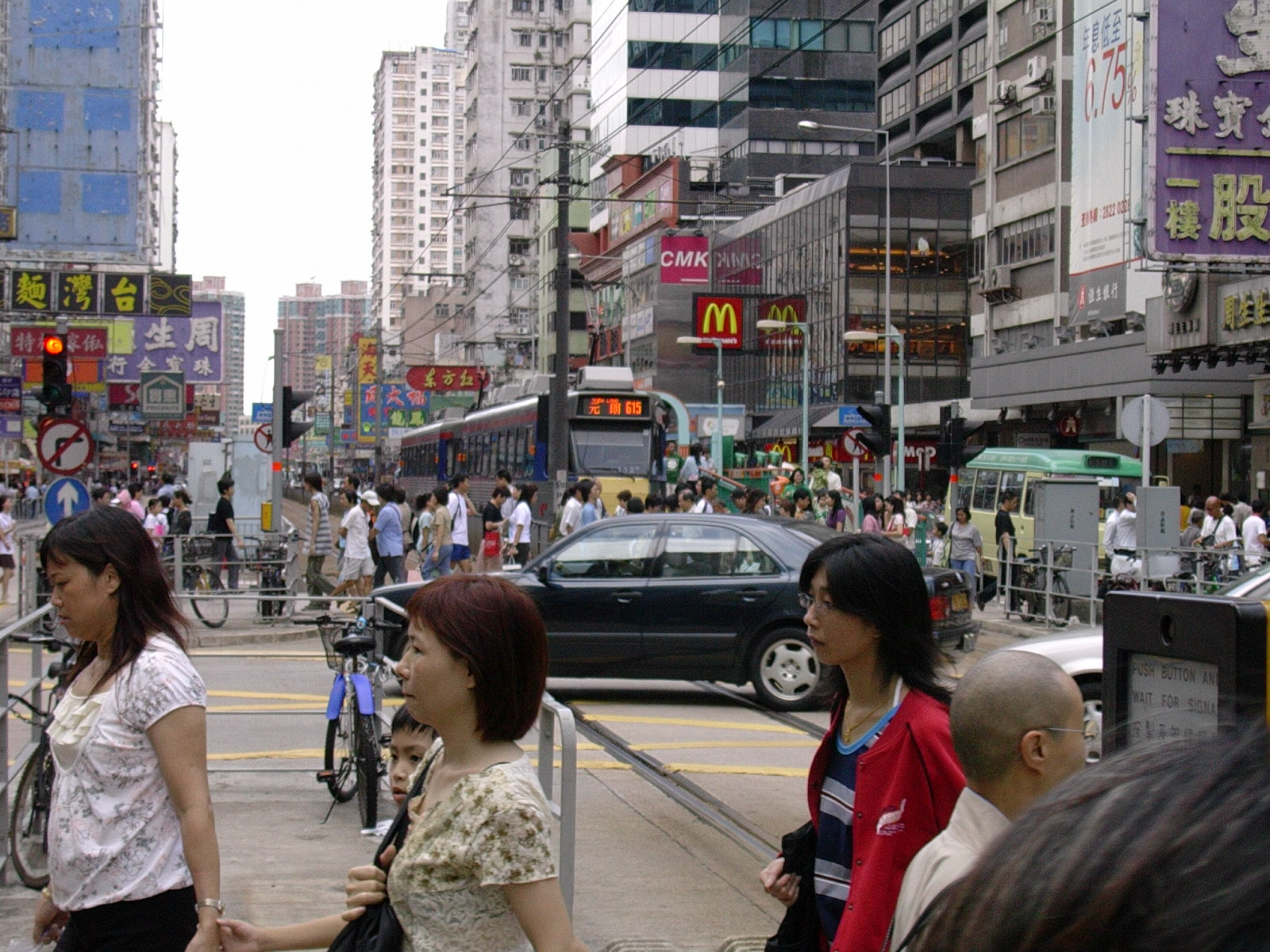
Centre of Yuen Long Town

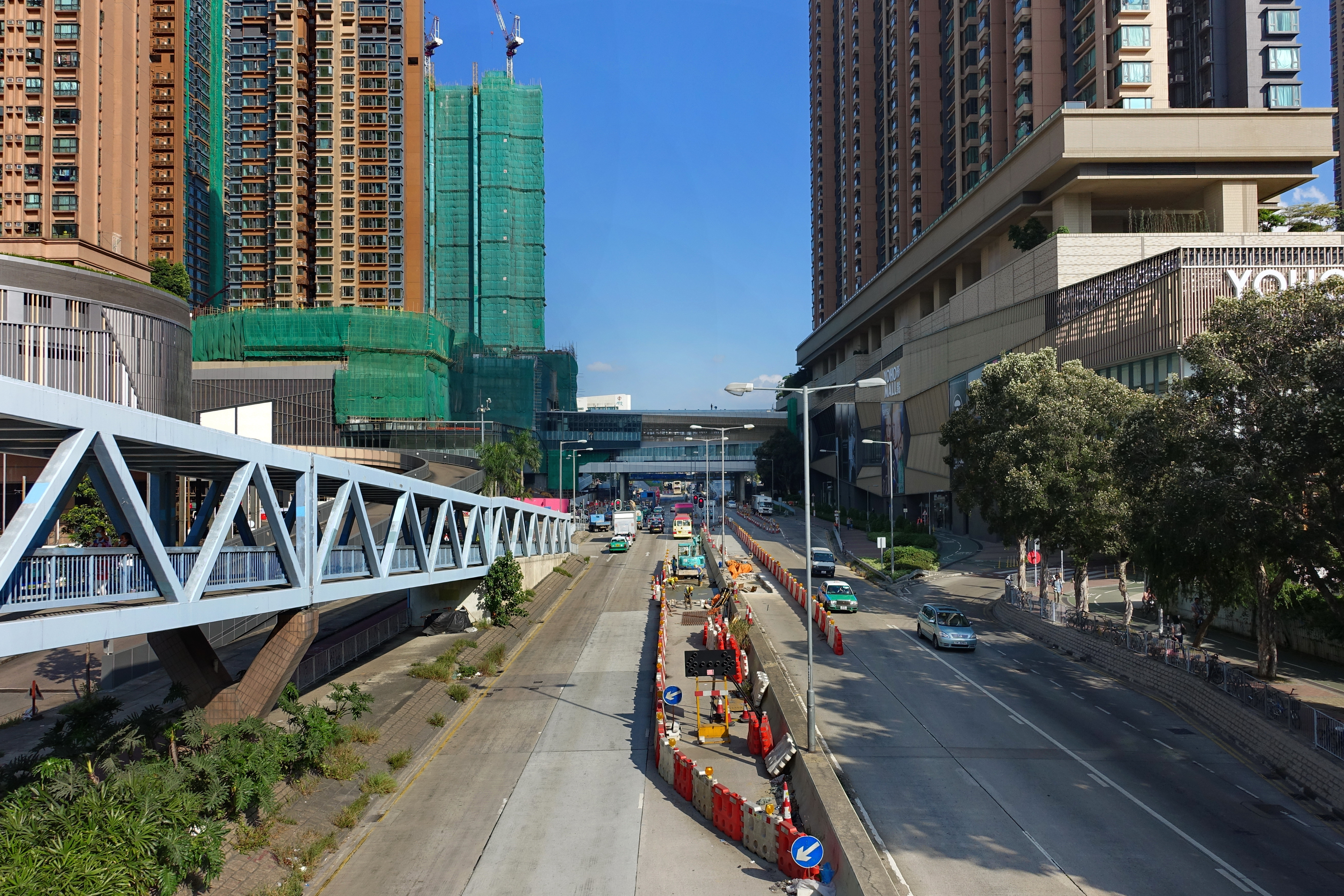
Castle Peak Road looking towards YOHO Mall

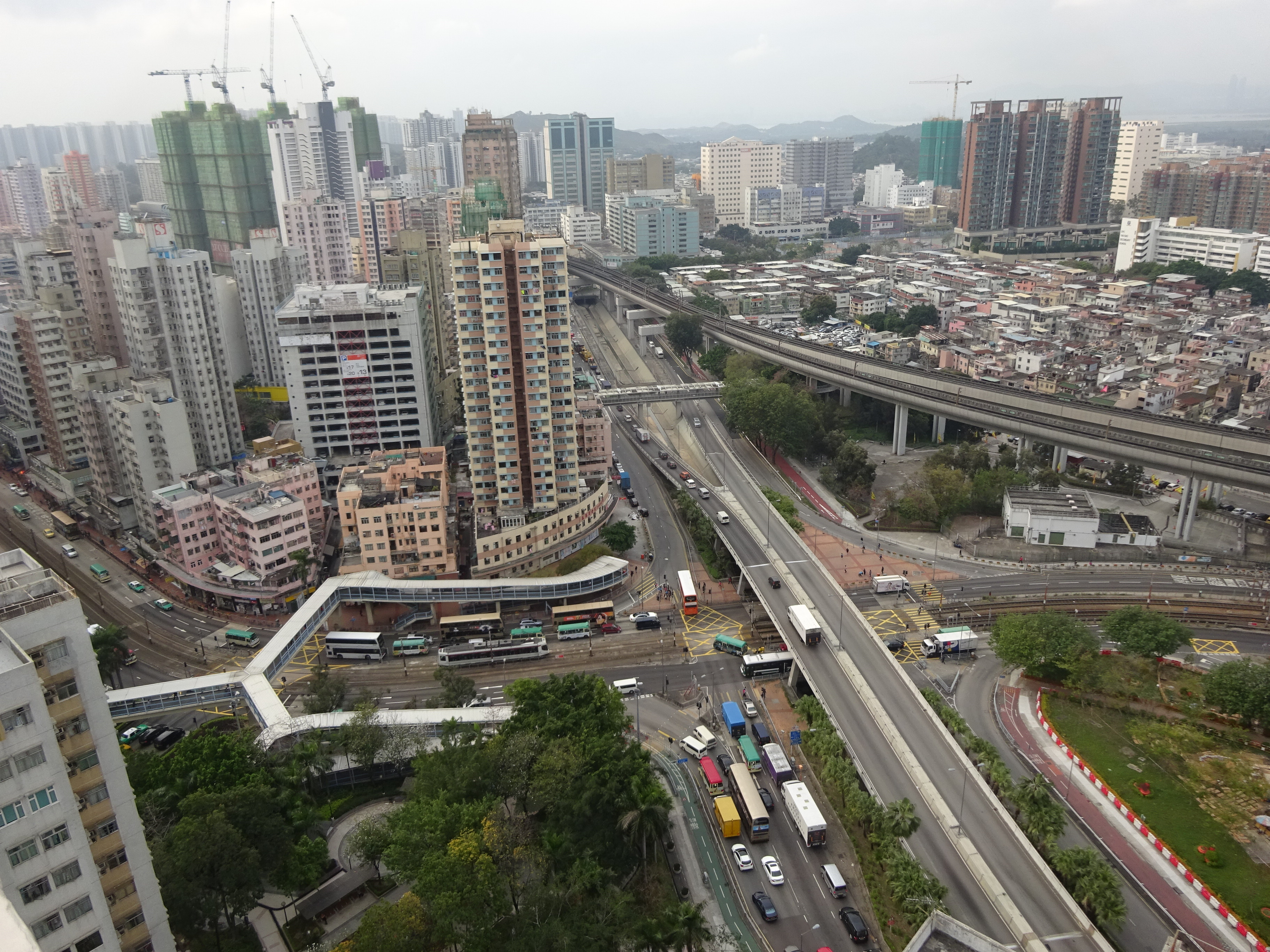
Residential Buildings in Yuen Long

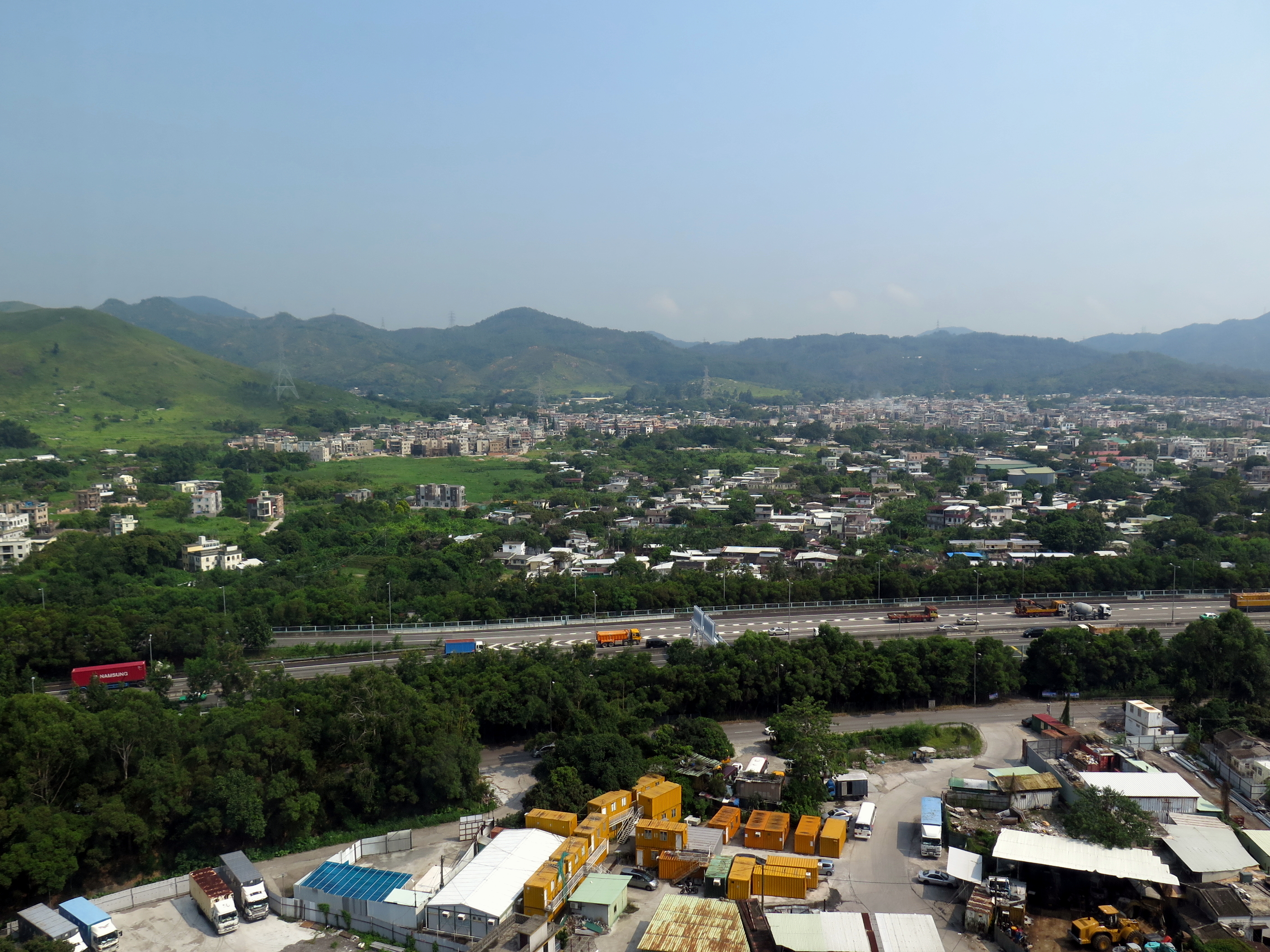
Shap Pat Heung

Yuen Long New Town is a new town in the northwest New Territories, Hong Kong. It was developed from the traditional market town of Yuen Long Town (元朗市) from the late 1970s onwards.

As it is located in the centre of the Yuen Long Plain, the town occupies the best location for surrounding villages to sell their crops and fish.

To the west is Ping Shan, south Shap Pat Heung, east Kam Tin, and north Nam Sang Wai.

== History ==
Yuen Long Town was a traditional market town in the area also known as Yuen Long San Hui today, within the Yuen Long District in the New Territories. The market town and the adjacent Long Ping Estate, Yuen Long Industrial Estate, Tong Tau Industrial Area, Yoho Town, etc. developed into the Yuen Long New Town in the 1970s and early 1980s. The Hong Kong Government first put Yuen Long New Town on the list of new towns in 1972 and planned several large-scale housing estates, the first of which started development in 1974. In 1978, Yuen Long New Town was put on the list of second generation new towns. It served as a secondary administrative centre.

Although the new town started in the 1970s, it was developed much more slowly compared to the other new towns due to its long distance from urban Kowloon. Commuters needed to travel via other areas like Tuen Mun or Shek Kong solely by road transport. With the rapid development of an adjacent new town, Tin Shui Wai New Town, in the 1980s, the road network was drastically improved by the late 1990s, although it was not until late 2003 that the West Rail line was completed which connected the new towns of Northwestern Hong Kong by rail to the rest of Hong Kong. These improvements spurred new waves of town development in the 2000s.

== Public housing ==
Under government plans, the western part of the new town is mainly residential. There are three public housing estates (including one Interim Housing) in the area.

== Industry ==
Industry is concentrated on the north side of Yuen Long New Town, namely within Yuen Long Industrial Estate and Tung Tau Industrial Area. These areas are managed by the Hong Kong Science and Technology Parks, only new and improved companies are allowed to operate in this area.

== Recreation ==
Yuen Long Park is located southwest of the town with a pagoda, accompanied by Yuen Long Stadium, Yuen Long Theatre and Yuen Long Swimming Pool. This area is less bustling than other parts of the new town.

== Transport ==
Before the Tai Lam Tunnel was opened, the Castle Peak Road and Tuen Mun Road formed the main arteries of traffic with urban Kowloon. If the two roads are closed due to accidents or any other reason, it would affect the traffic of Yuen Long. The Tai Lam Tunnel and Tuen Ma line provide alternative routes to residents of Yuen Long going to Kowloon while some bus routes connected urban area and Yuen Long New Town together by New Territories East highway networks before Tai Lam Tunnel opened.

There are two Tuen Ma line stations in the new town, Long Ping and Yuen Long, located near Long Ping Estate and eastern end of the town respectively. Light Rail route travels along the main road (Castle Peak Road, commonly known as "Yuen Long Main Road" by locals) located at the centre of the town. Yuen Long station is the interchange station of Tuen Ma line and Light Rail.

The Light Rail system is also located in part of Yuen Long New Town and provides connections to both Tin Shui Wai and Tuen Mun New Towns alongside the Tuen Ma Line.

== See also ==
- Yuen Long Town
