= Technology Incubation Programme =

The Technology Incubation Programme (TIP) is a government funding program of the Hong Kong Science and Technology Parks Corporation (HKSTP) under the Hong Kong Government.

The Technology Incubation Programme provides start-up with funding and subsidy access to research and development facilities. The Incu-App designed for internet and mobile application platform developers, Incu-Tech designed for technology start-ups, Incu-Bio designed for biotechnology entrepreneur.

== Technology areas ==
- Web-based applications
- Smartphone-based applications
- Personal Computer / internet/ smartphone/ console games
- Therapeutics/ Personal Care
- Chinese or Herbal Medicine
- Regenerative Medicines
- Medical Devices
- Diagnostics
- Electronics
- Green Technology
- Information Communications Technology (ICT)
- Material and Precision Engineering

== Funded and graduated enterprises ==
- Awesapp Ltd.: Hong Kong ICT Awards 2014: Best Mobile Apps (Mobile Enterprise Solution) Award, Silver Award - Special Mention (Start-up Company) Awesapp Ltd. iSafe
- CardApp Limited : HKICT - Best ICT Startup (Social Innovation) Award - Bronze Award

== About Hong Kong Science and Technology Parks Corporation (HKSTP) ==
The purpose of the corporation are to facilitate the research and development and application of technologies in manufacturing and service industries in Hong Kong; to support the development, transfer and use of new or advance technologies in Hong Kong; and to establish or develop any premises where activities related to the purpose prescribed above are, or are to be, carried out, and to manage and control the land and other facilities comprised in such premises.
