= Yuen Long Plain =

Geographic area in Hong Kong

Coordinates: 22.447°N 114.023°E

- Traditional Chinese: 元朗平原
Transcriptions
Standard Mandarin
- Wade–Giles: Yüan-lang pʻing-yüan
Yue: Cantonese
- Yale Romanization: Yùhn lóhng pìhng yùhn
- Jyutping: Jyun4 long5 ping4 jyun4

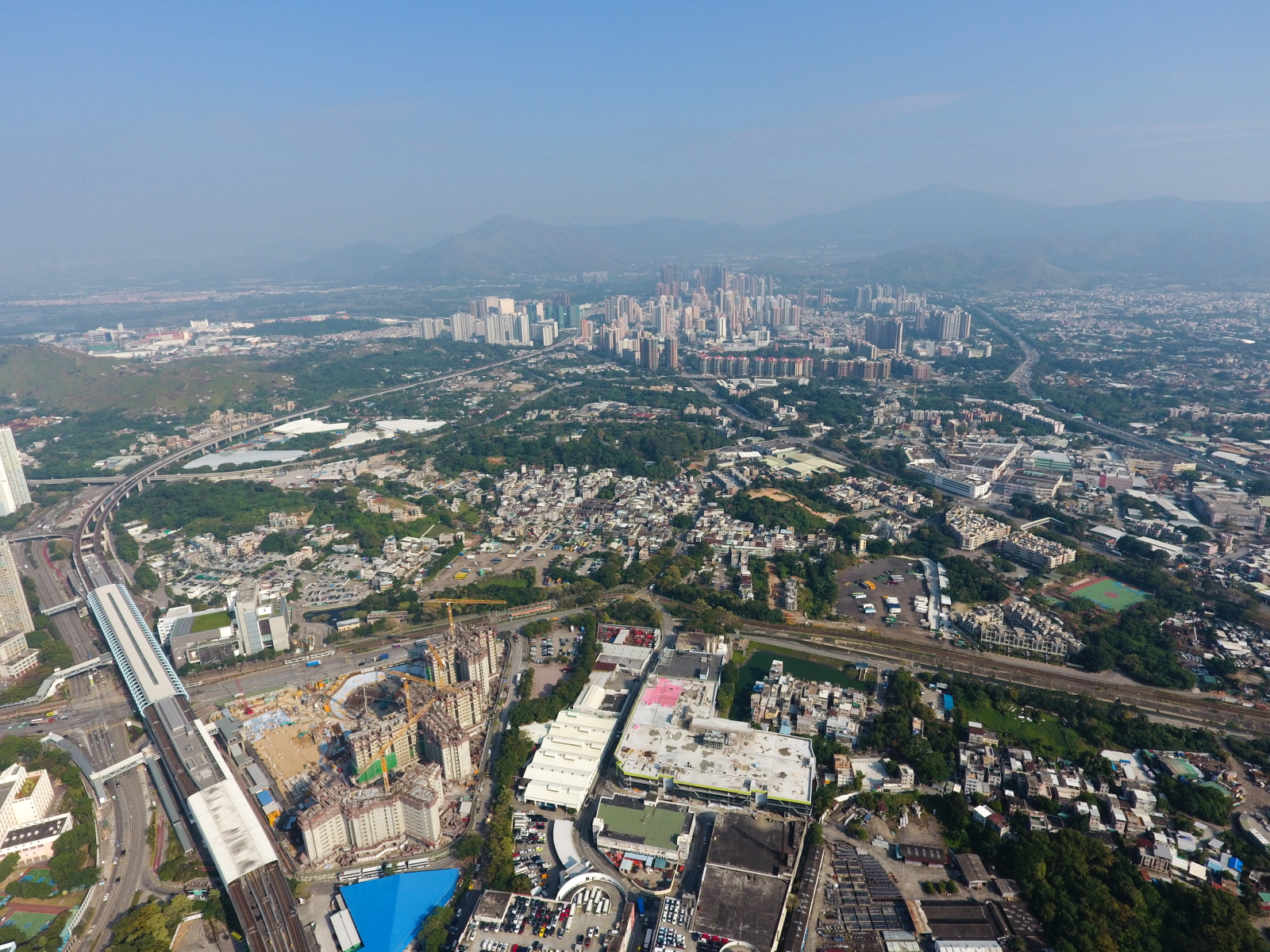
Aerial view of Yuen Long Plain (2016)

The Yuen Long Plain, in the northwestern corner of the New Territories, is the largest alluvial plain in Hong Kong. With an area of 144.3 square kilometres (55.7 sq mi), it was formed between the time of the Tang dynasty (618–907) and Song dynasty (960–1279). It covers Yuen Long Town, Tin Shui Wai, Lau Fau Shan, Ping Shan, Shap Pat Heung, Hung Shui Kiu, San Tin, Lok Ma Chau, Pat Heung, Kam Tin, Nam Sang Wai, Mai Po, etc.

In the past it was mainly covered by marshes, fields and fish ponds. Yuen Long New Town and Tin Shui Wai New Town were built on the plain.

Historically, there have been large numbers of duck and pig farms in Yuen Long.
