= Yuen Long District =

Yuen Long 元朗區
- District
- Yuen Long District
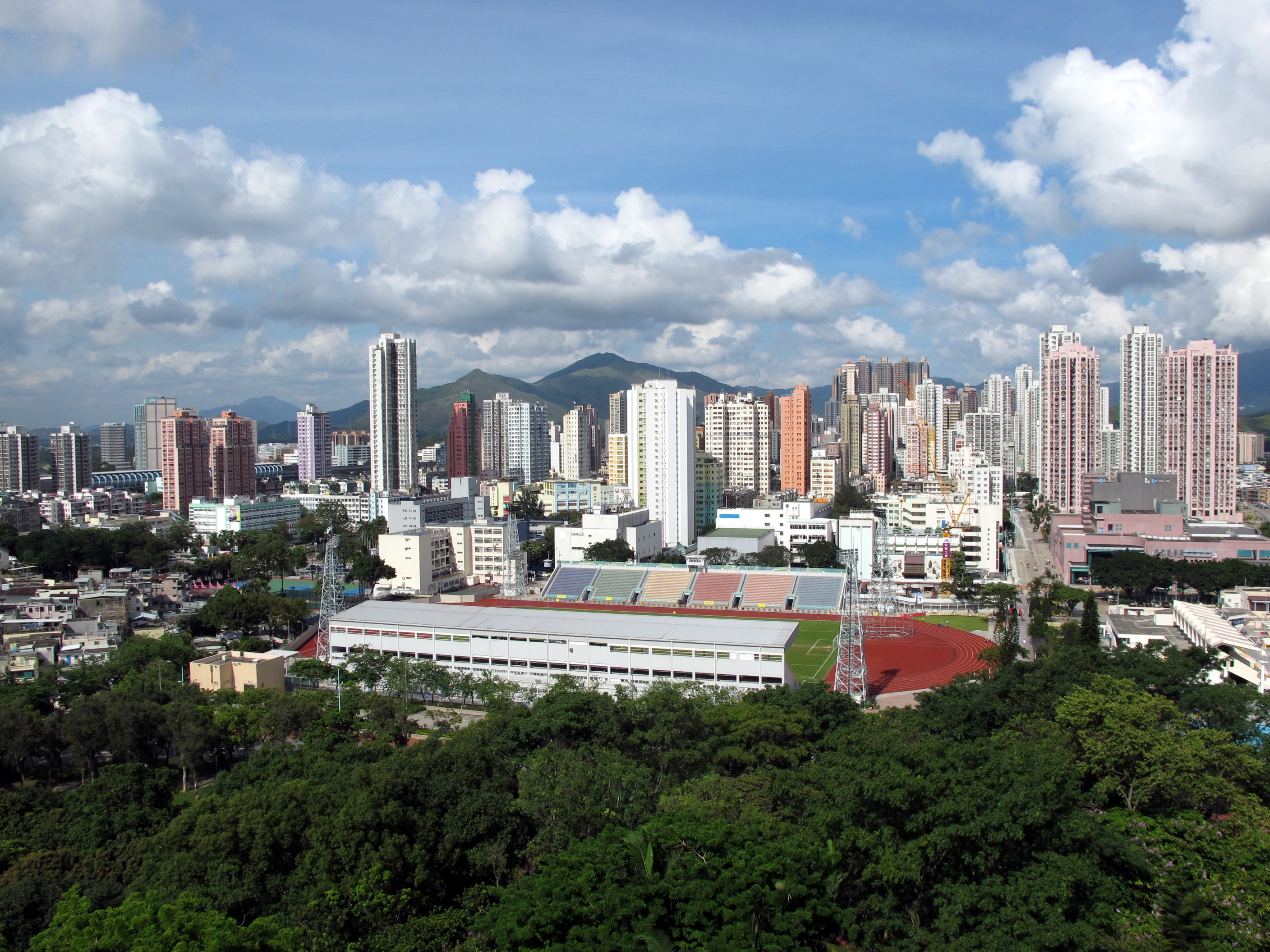
- Day view of the Yuen Long District skyline

- Official emblem

- Location of Yuen Long District within Hong Kong
- Coordinates: 22°26′44″N 114°01′20″E
- Country: China
- SAR: Hong Kong
- Region: New Territories
- Constituencies: 39

Government
  - District Council Chairman: Shum Ho-Kit
  - District Council Vice-Chairman: Tang Ho-Nin

Area
  - Total: 138.56 km^{2} (53.50 sq mi)
  - Land: 138.56 km^{2} (53.50 sq mi)
- Lands Department

Population (2021)
  - Total: 668,080
  - Density: 4,822/km^{2} (12,490/sq mi)
- Census and Statistics Department
- Time zone: UTC+8 (Hong Kong Time)
- Largest neighbourhood by population: Tin Shui Wai (286,232 – 2016 est)
- Location of district office and district council: 269 Castle Peak Road – Yuen Long‌, Yuen Long
- Website: Yuen Long District Council

Yuen Long District
- Traditional Chinese: 元朗區
- Simplified Chinese: 元朗区
- Cantonese Yale: Yùhn lóhng kēui
- Jyutping: Jyun4 long5 keoi1
Transcriptions
Standard Mandarin
- Hanyu Pinyin: Yuán lǎng qū
Yue: Cantonese
- Yale Romanization: Yùhn lóhng kēui
- Jyutping: Jyun4 long5 keoi1
- IPA: [jyn˩.lɔŋ˩˧ kʰɵɥ˥]

Yuen Long District (formerly Un Long) is one of the districts of Hong Kong. Located in the northwest of the New Territories, it had a population of 662,000 in 2021.

== Geography ==
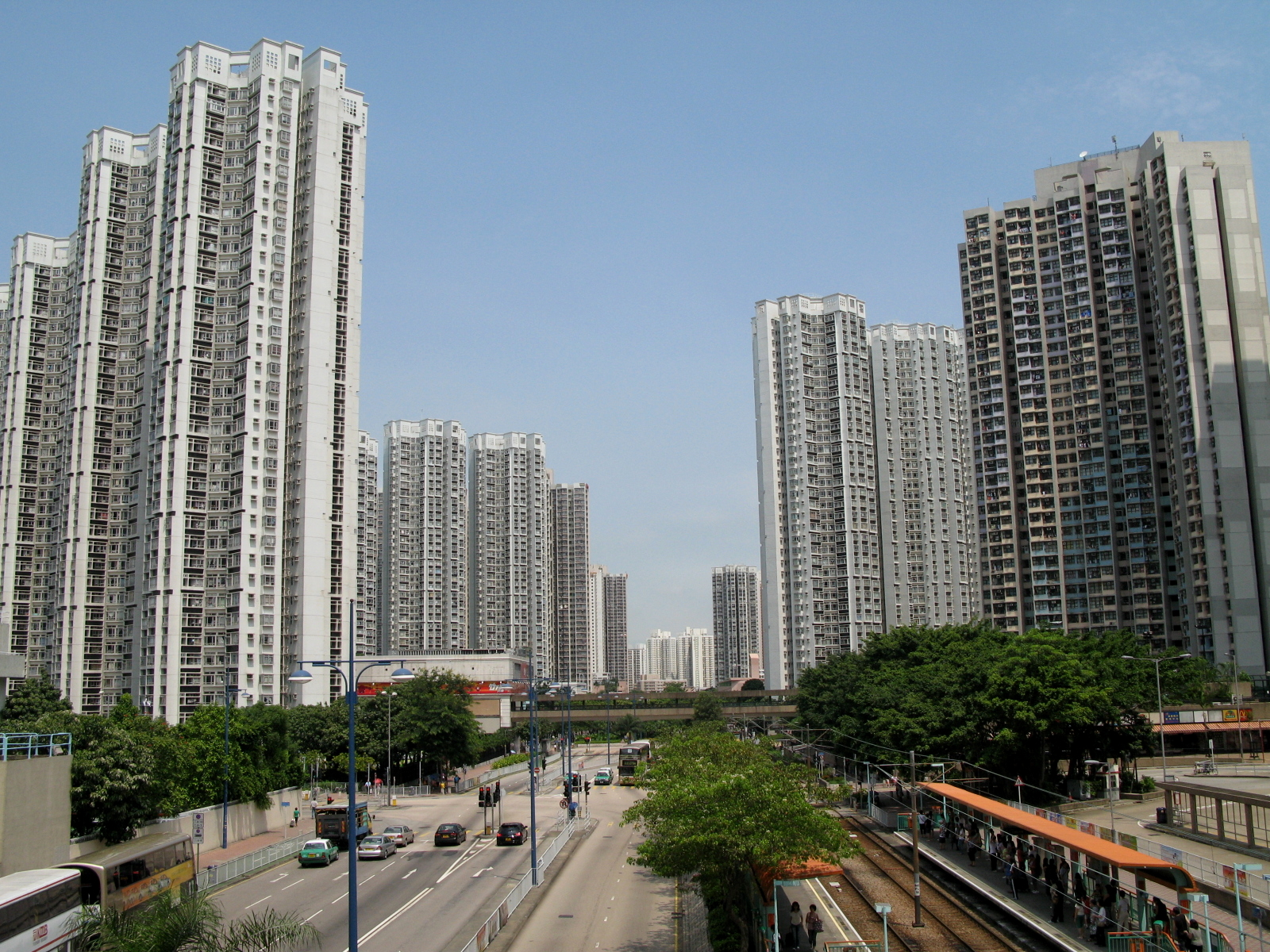
Tin Shui Wai New Town

Yuen Long District contains the largest alluvial plain in Hong Kong, the Yuen Long-Kam Tin plain. With an area of 144 km^{2} (56 square miles), the district covers many traditional villages including Ping Shan Heung, Ha Tsuen Heung, Kam Tin Heung, Fung Kat Heung, Pat Heung, San Tin Heung and Shap Pat Heung, as well as Yuen Long Town and Tin Shui Wai.

Two new towns have been developed within this district. Yuen Long New Town was developed from the traditional market town of Yuen Long Town from the late 1970s. Tin Shui Wai New Town has developed since the early 1990s and is built on land reclaimed from former fish ponds once common in the district.

== History ==
According to archaeological findings, there were inhabitants settled in the district around 3,500 years ago. The ruling clan of the Tang Clan (Chinese: 鄧氏家族) lived there in Kam Tin. Like Tai Po, Yuen Long used to be a traditional market town.

In 1898 the area of the modern day Yuen Long District was leased to the colonial British Hong Kong government by the Convention for the Extension of Hong Kong Territory. A 6 day-war broke out between the British army and the militia from Tang and other villages. The iron doors of the walled villages of Tang were looted and brought to the UK as spoils of war. They were returned to Tang later, but according to urban legend, the doors were mixed up and were not returned to the rightful villages, possibly explaining the two sides of the door of Kat Hing Wai being different in design.

After the war, the colonial government took a different approach to administer the New Territories, establishing the district office. Yuen Long was under the District Office North headquartered in Tai Po. A permanent branch office was later set up in Yuen Long.

The history of the modern-day Yuen Long administrative district (despite a few government departments not mapping their service area according to the boundary of the District) can be traced back to Yuen Long District Office (previously known as Chinese: 元朗理民府 now known as Chinese: 元朗民政事務處 of Home Affairs Department; English name unchanged) of the "New Territories Administration" department of the British colonial government. Reforms in 1980s led to all of Hong Kong, including the New Territories, being divided into Districts, each with a District Council with elected councillors. The last election of the Yuen Long District Council was held in 2023.

== Culture ==
=== Special festivals ===
The Tin Hau Festival (天后誕巡遊) is on the 23rd of the third month of the lunar calendar. It celebrates the birth of a local deity, Tin Hau. During the day, residents from various walled villages set off at Fung Cheung Road, go via Kau Yuk Road and the Yuen Long Stadium, and end at Tai Shu Ha Tin Hau Temple, which has a 300-year history.

=== Cuisine ===
- Poon choi (盤菜)
- Sweetheart cake (老婆餅)

== Popular scenic spots ==
=== Hong Kong Wetland Park ===
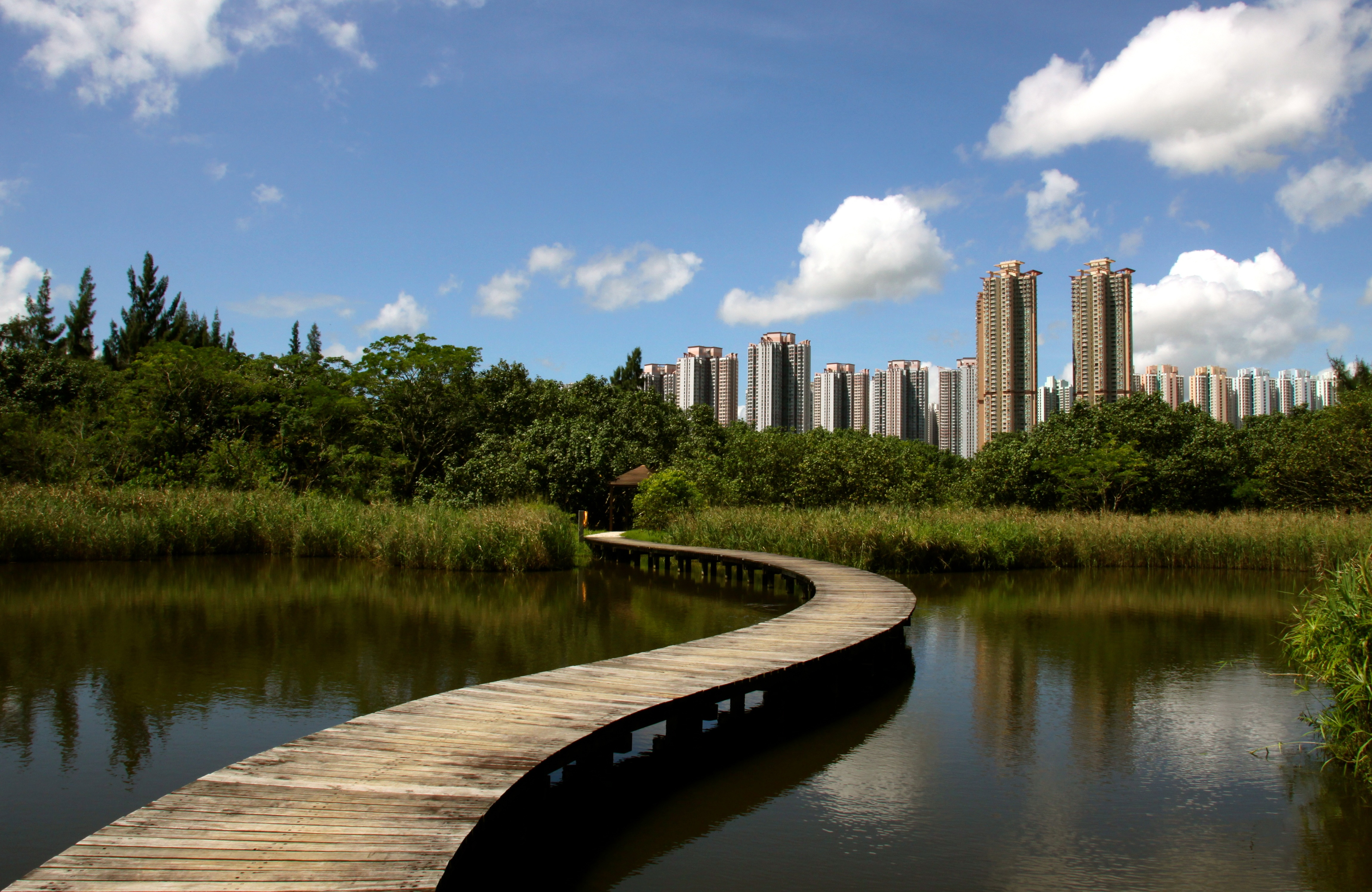
Hong Kong Wetland Park

Hong Kong Wetland Park (香港濕地公園) is located at the northern part of Tin Shui Wai. It was intended to be an ecological mitigation area (EMA) for the wetlands lost due to Tin Shui Wai New Town development. In 1998, a project named as "International Wetland Park and Visitor Centre Feasibility Study" was initiated by the Agriculture, Fisheries and Conservation Department and the Hong Kong Tourism Board with a view to expanding the EMA to a wetland ecotourism attraction. After concluding that it was feasible to develop a wetland park at the EMA site without compromising its intended ecological mitigation functions and the development of the Wetland Park will also enhance the ecological function of the EMA to a world-class conservation, education and tourism facility, the concerned parties started the Wetland Park Project, which is regarded as one of the Millennium projects by the Administrations.

=== Kat Hing Wai ===
Kat Hing Wai (吉慶圍) in Kam Tin is one of the Yuen Long's best-known walled villages. It is the ancestral home of the Tangs, one of the "Five Great Clans" in the territory. Built by the Tangs 500 years ago, it is a rectangular walled village with an area of 100 metres by 90 metres. As a family stronghold, Kat Hing Wai has served the Tangs well through centuries. In the Qing dynasty, a five-metre high blue brick wall and four cannon towers were added to fend off bandits.

Route: Tuen Ma line Kam Sheung Road station or KMB routes 54, 64K and 77K

=== Nam Sang Wai ===
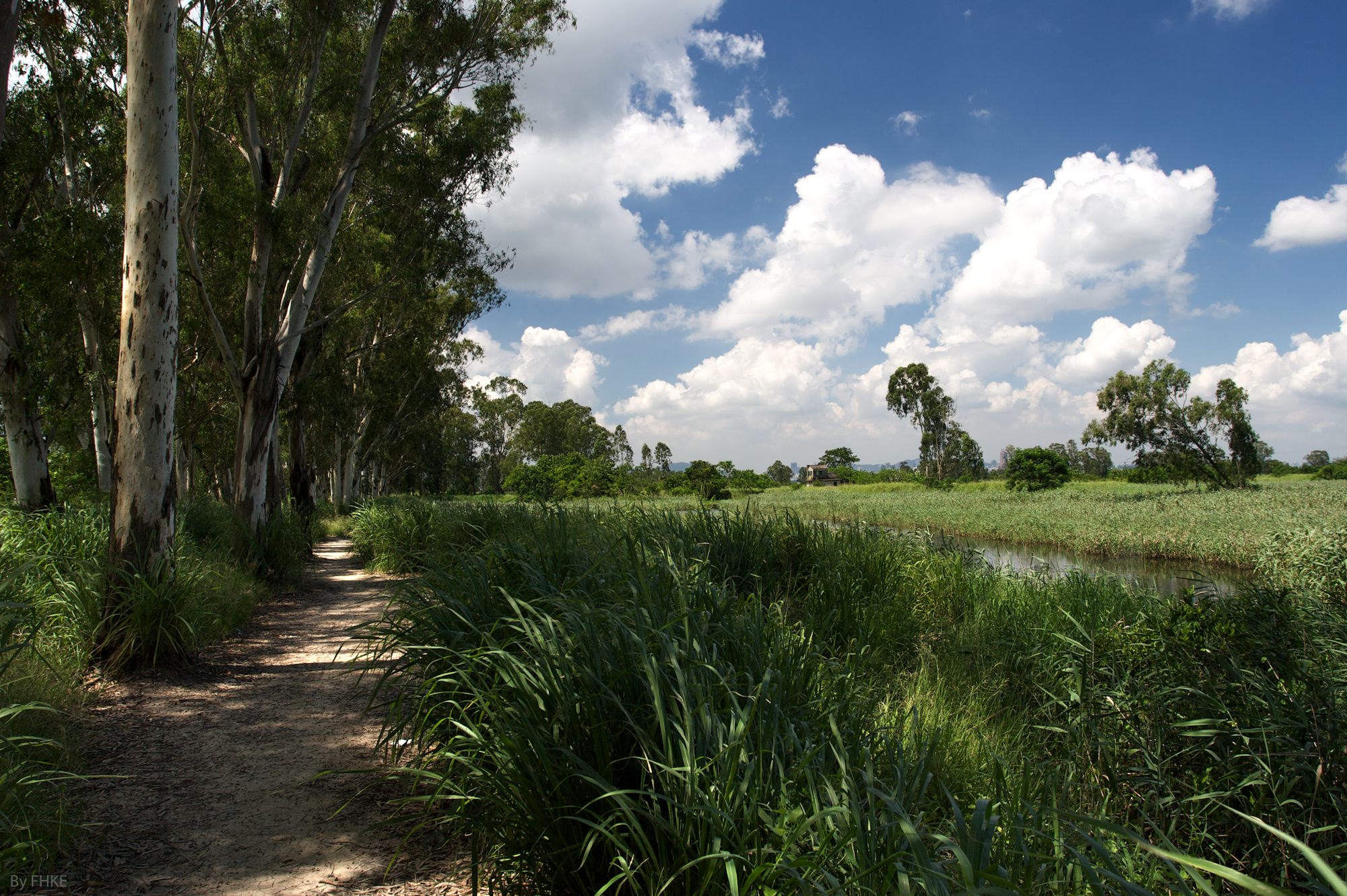
Nam Sang Wai

Nam Sang Wai (南生圍) covers a roughly triangular area. It is bordered by the Shan Pui River in the west, separating it from Yuen Long Industrial Estate, the Kam Tin River in the east and a branch of the Kam Tin River in the south. It is home to many birds, including seagulls, Northern Pintails (Anas acuta), Yellow-nib Ducks (Anas poecilorhyncha) and Black-faced Spoonbills (Platalea minor). Flora includes reeds and mangroves.

=== Mai Po Marshes ===
Mai Po Marshes (米埔) is located in the centre of the wetland and has achieved international significance as a stopping and feeding place for migratory birds along the East Asian-Australian Flyway. The birdwatching season runs from October to May and more than 300 types of birds have been recorded in the area, many of them are rarely seen anywhere outside the region.

Visitors may go to Mai Po via the following ways:

- From Central or Causeway Bay take route 968 to Yuen Long (West) Bus terminal, then change taxi.
- From Sheung Shui station, take Bus 76K or red minibus 17 to Mai Po village, then walk to the Marsh (about 20 minutes).

On 30 January 2004, the government suspended public visits to the Mai Po wetland reserve as a supposed measure to protect people from the avian flu (H5N1).

=== Ping Shan Heritage Trail ===
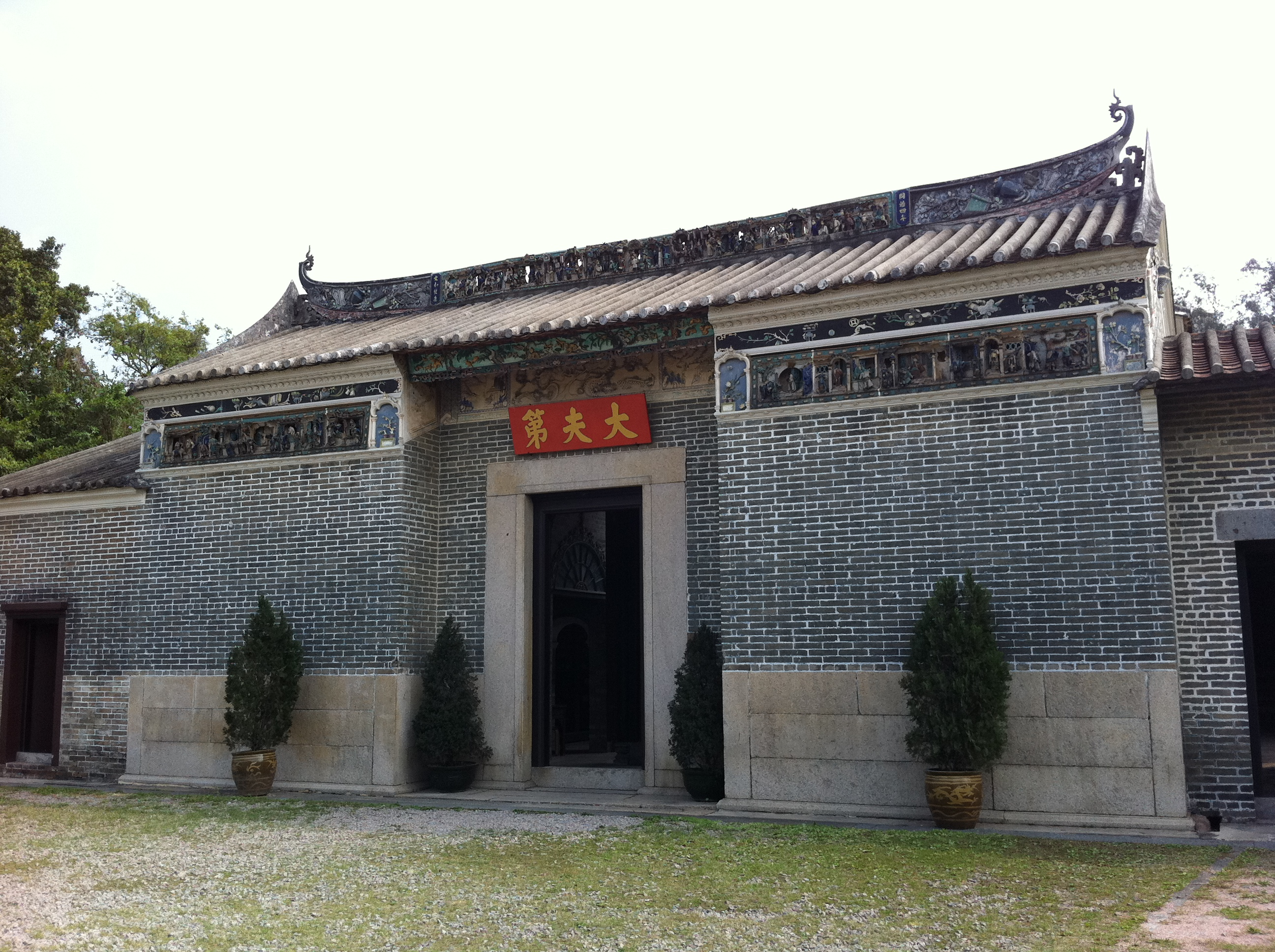
The Tai Fu Tai Mansion is a historical monument in Hong Kong.

Ping Shan Heritage Trail (屏山文物徑), inaugurated on 12 December 1993, was designed to link several historic buildings and monuments owned by the Tang clan in Ping Shan (including Tsui Sing Lau Pagoda 聚星樓 and Tang Ancestral Hall 鄧氏宗祠) by a 1 km trail.

Route: LRT Ping Shan stop, Hang Mei Tsuen stop or West Rail line Tin Shui Wai station

=== Tai Fu Tai ===
Tai Fu Tai Mansion (大夫第) in San Tin was probably built in 1865 in the reign of the Qing dynasty. It is a richly embellished residence situated on a spacious ground, with a large open space in the front and a garden at the back. The whole compound is surrounded by a green-brick wall. It is a fine example of traditional Chinese dwellings of the scholar-gentry class and is certainly one of the most elegant buildings throughout the territory.

Route: KMB Bus 76K to San Tin

=== Tai Lam Country Park ===
Tai Lam Country Park sits in the western New Territories with an area of 54 km^{2}. Tai Lam has a small area of porphyry in the northeast; for the remaining area, it is composed of highly erodible decomposed granite. In 1952, afforestation started as a measure to protect the water catchment area. In spite of the poor soil conditions and the setbacks of fire damage over the years, mature stands of Acacia confusa, Lophostemon confertus, Pinus massoniana, Pinus elliottii and Eucalyptus species now cover most of the area. In addition, the plantations also offer a good habitat for birds, pangolins, Chinese leopard cat, and barking deer. Nevertheless, Tai Lam is an excellent place for outdoor activities because of its remoteness.

=== Yuen Long Park ===
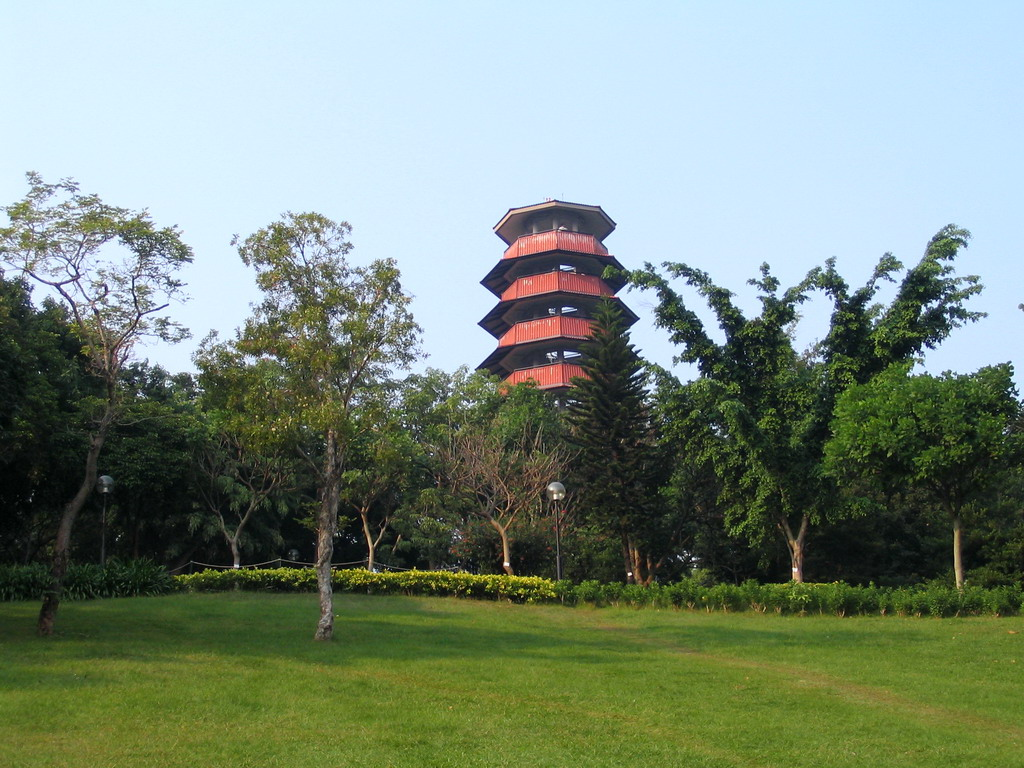
Aviary Pagoda (百鳥塔)

Yuen Long Park (元朗市鎮公園) is a park at Yuen Long Town with recreational facilities. There is a 7-storey pagoda enclosing an aviary, which has become a landmark of Yuen Long.

Route: LRT Shui Pin Wai stop, LWB bus E34 or KMB Bus 68X, 268B, 268C, 268X, 269D, 276, 276P, B1, 68E (get off the bus at Yuen Long Park.)

== Leisure and cultural facilities ==
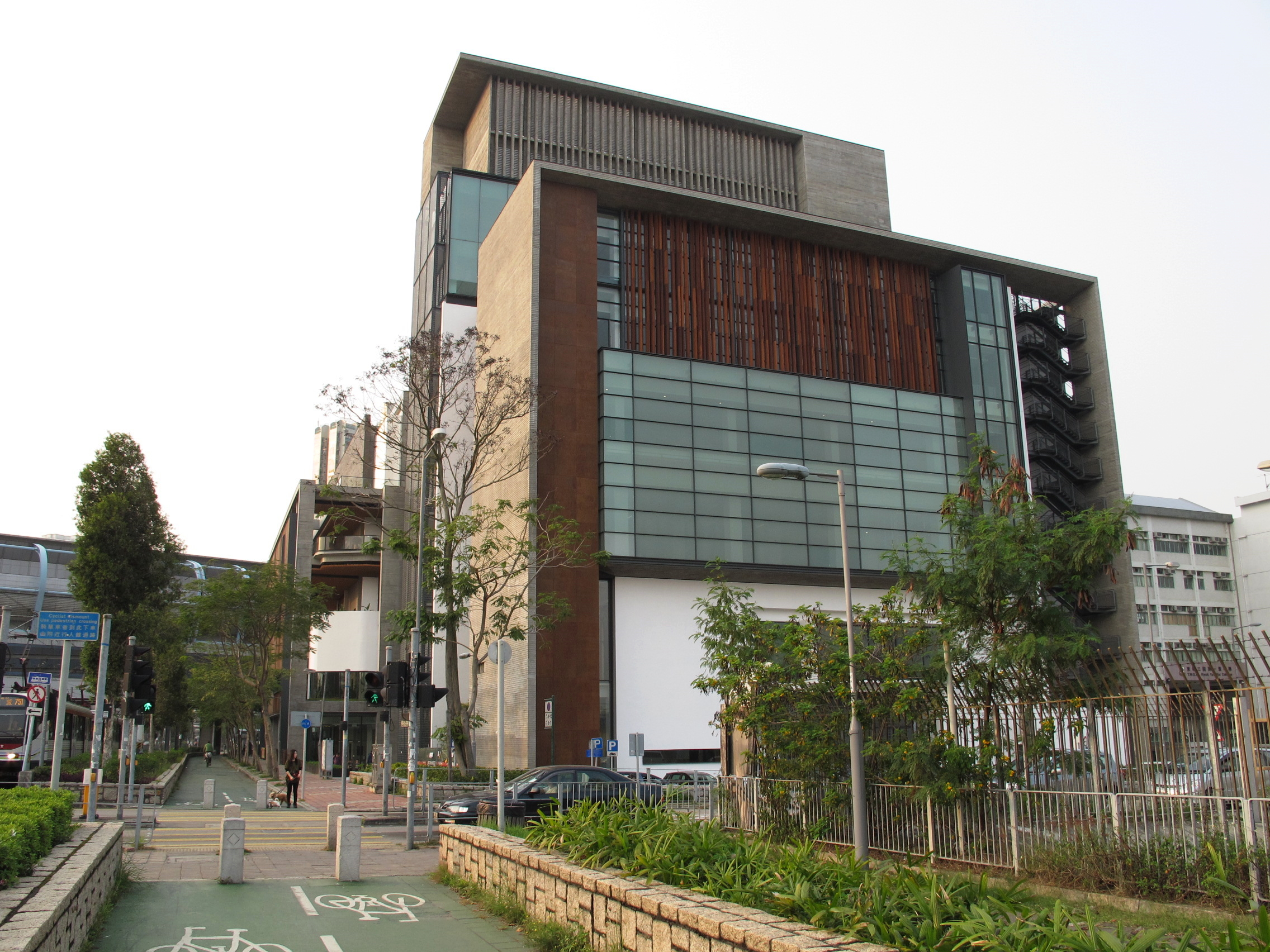
Ping Shan Tin Shui Wai Cultural and Leisure Building

- Yuen Long Theatre was opened in May 2000. This modern performing arts venue has become a centre for the arts in the New Territories northwest. The Theatre is situated at Yuen Long Tai Yuk Road in the vicinity of Yuen Long Park, Yuen Long Stadium and the Public Swimming Pool. The bamboo courtyard is a focus within the foyer, which creates an ambiance of serenity and tranquility.
- Yuen Long Town Hall is located in Kau Yuk Road, near Yuen Long Police Station. It is to organise courses and leisure activities. There is also study room.
- Yuen Long Swimming Pool is situated at Tai Yuk Road. There are 5 Standard swimming pools for four seasons.
- Tin Shui Wai Swimming Pool and Tin Shui Wai Sports Centre are situated at 1 Tin Pak Road. There are 3 swimming pools for four seasons and a children swimming pool opened during summer.
- Yuen Long Public Library is on the first floor of Yuen Long Government Offices, 2 Kiu Lok Square, Yuen Long.
- Ping Shan Tin Shui Wai Public Library is at Ping Shan Tin Shui Wai Leisure and Cultural Building, 1 Tsui Sing Road, Tin Shui Wai.
- TSW Pegasus and Yuen Long District SA are both football teams based in Yuen Long Stadium.

== Transport ==
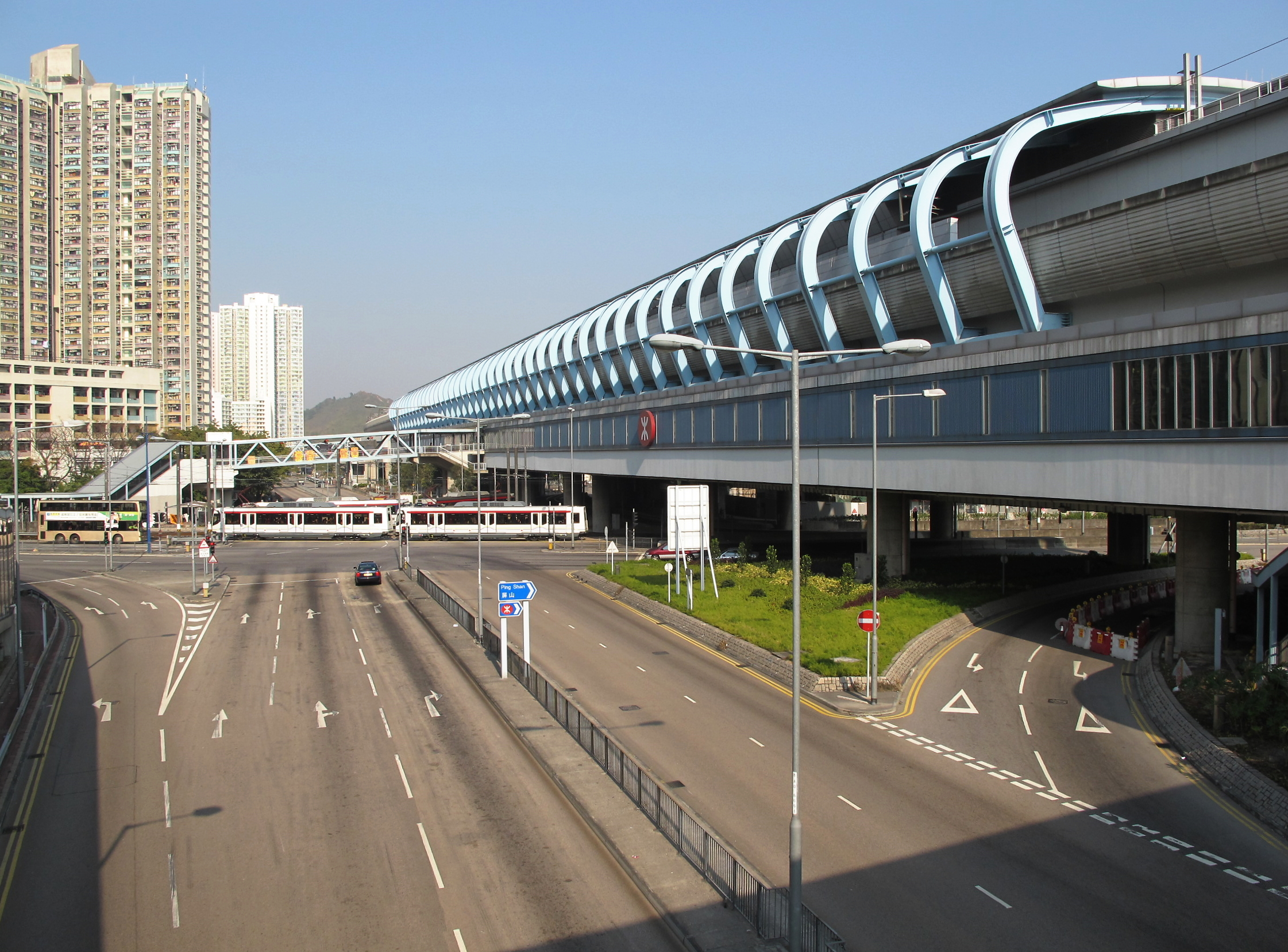
The exterior of Tin Shui Wai station on the Tuen Ma Line, with a Light Rail vehicle visible in the background

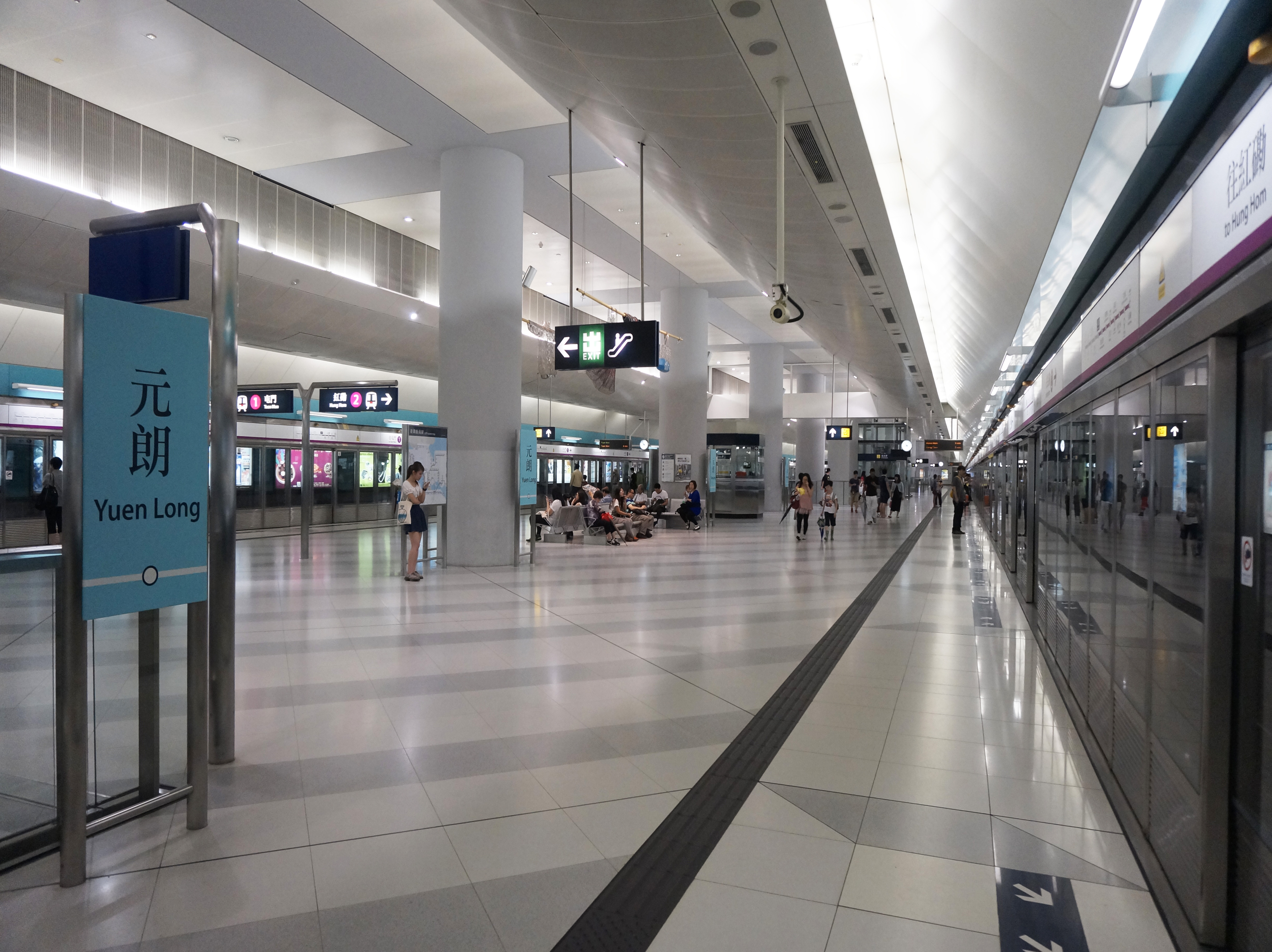
The platform level of Yuen Long station on the Tuen Ma Line

Located in the northwest of the New Territories, Yuen Long has a well-developed public transport network. It is easily accessible from different parts of Hong Kong by bus, mini-bus or railway.

- Bus services provided by Kowloon Motor Bus, Citybus and MTR
- Tuen Ma line and Light Rail services provided by MTR
- Public light buses
- Taxis, including the New Territories taxis (green taxis) and public taxis (public taxis).

The Hong Kong–Shenzhen Western Corridor bridge (深港西部通道) is the fourth cross-border route between Hong Kong and mainland China. It was completed and opened in 2007, and is 5.5 km long. It starts at Ngau Hom Shek (鰲磡石), located at the northwest of Yuen Long, and ends in Shekou, a harbour port located in Shenzhen.

== Education ==
- List of schools in Yuen Long District

Hong Kong Public Libraries operates three libraries in this district: Ping Shan Tin Shui Wai, Tin Shui Wai, and Yuen Long.

== Statistical information ==
Demographic characteristics
Population		449,070
Proportion of population (%)	Aged under 15	20
Proportion of population (%)	Aged 15–64	71
Proportion of population (%)	Aged 65 and over	9
Median age		33
Proportion of population aged 15 and over being never married (%)	Male	32
Proportion of population aged 15 and over being never married (%)	Female	27
Education
School attendance rate of population aged 6–18 (%)		92.9
Proportion of non-student population aged 20 and over having attained tertiary education (%)		10.9
Labour force characteristics
Labour force		219,444
Labour force participation rate (%)	Male	74.0
Labour force participation rate (%)	Female	48.2
Labour force participation rate (%)	Both sexes	60.9
Median monthly income from main employment of working population (HK$)		10,588.7
Household characteristics
Number of domestic households		137,211
Average domestic household size		3.2
Median monthly domestic household income (HK$)		16,763.5
Housing characteristics
Number of occupied quarters		136,705
Average number of domestic households per unit of quarters		1.01
Proportion of domestic households owning the quarters they occupy (%)		48.15
Median monthly domestic household mortgage payment and loan repayment (HK$)		7,693.83
Median mortgage payment and loan repayment to income ratio (%)		24.63
Median monthly domestic household rent (HK$)		2,513.04
Median rent to income ratio (%)		16.36

== See also ==
- List of places in Hong Kong
- Democratic Alliance
- Yuen Long Town
