= Yuen Long Town =

Human settlement in New Territories, Hong Kong

Coordinates: 22°26′40.09″N 114°01′32.88″E

- Traditional Chinese: 元朗市
Transcriptions
Yue: Cantonese
- Yale Romanization: Yùhn lóhng síh
- Jyutping: Jyun4 long5 si5

Location of Yuen Long Town in Hong Kong.

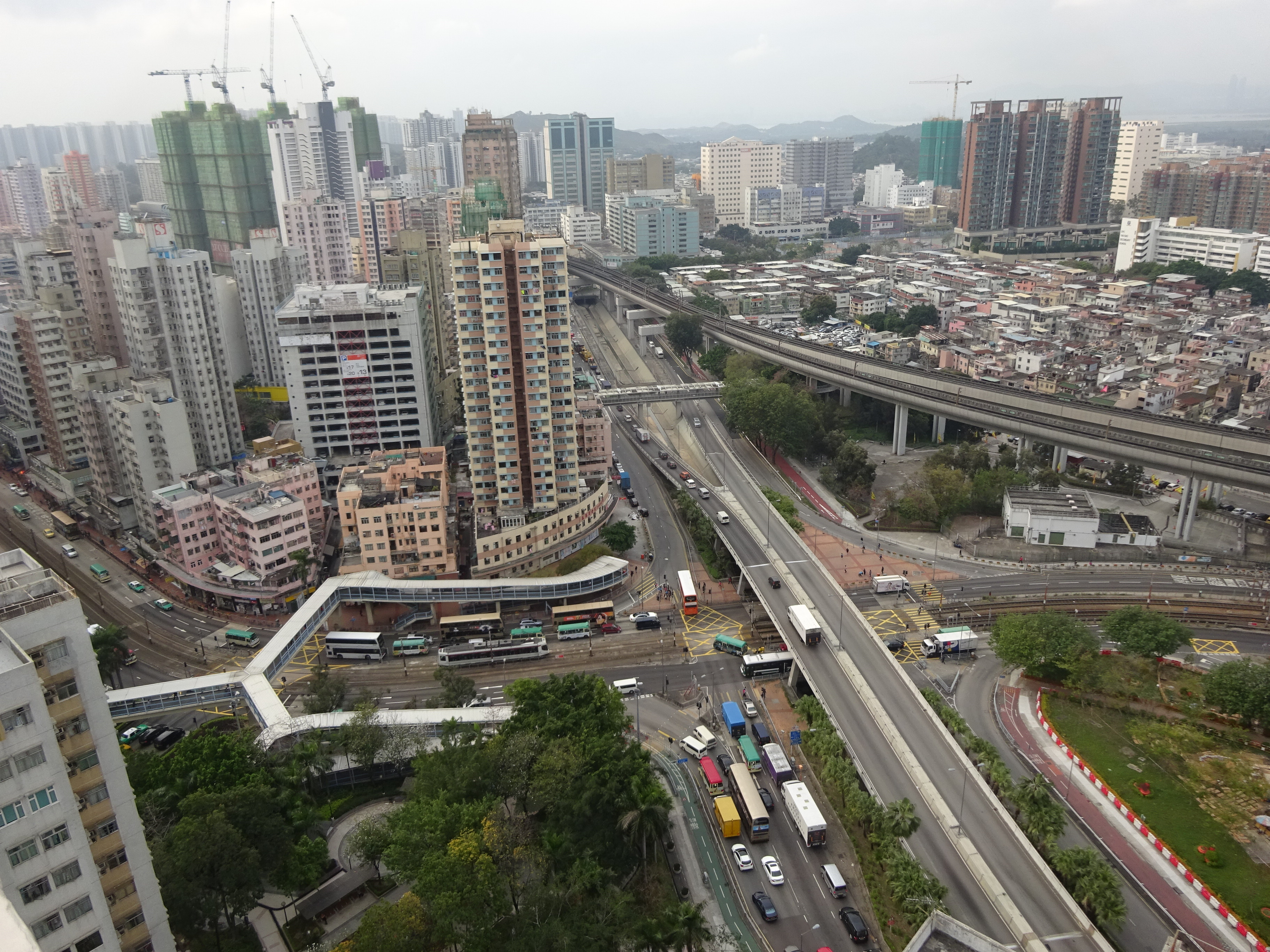
Yuen Long Town (2016)

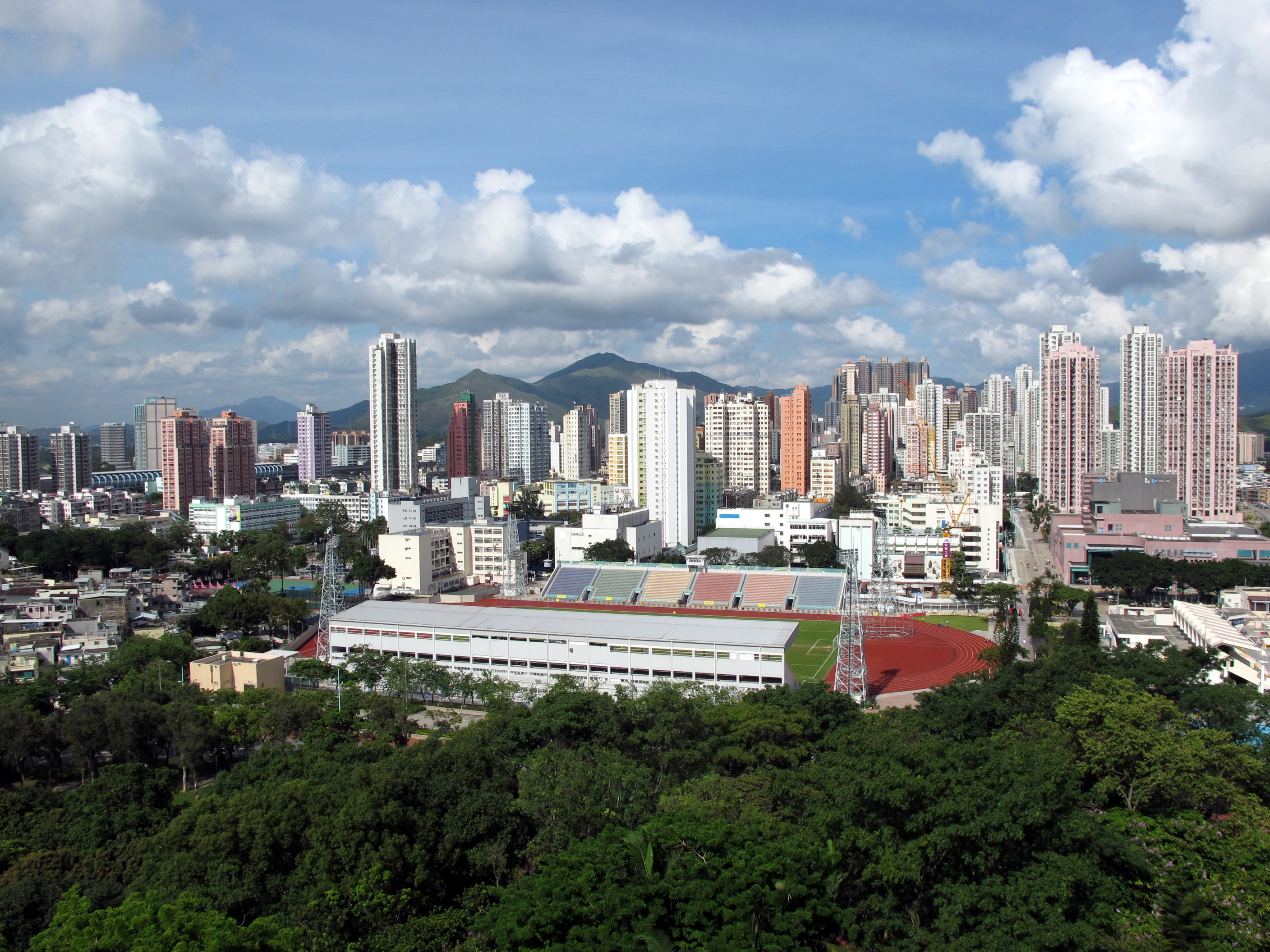
Yuen Long Town (2010)

Yuen Long Town (formerly Un Long Town or Un Long Hui) is located in the district centre of Yuen Long District, New Territories, Hong Kong. It is the heart of Yuen Long and Yuen Long New Town, with a population of around 200,000.

== Geography ==
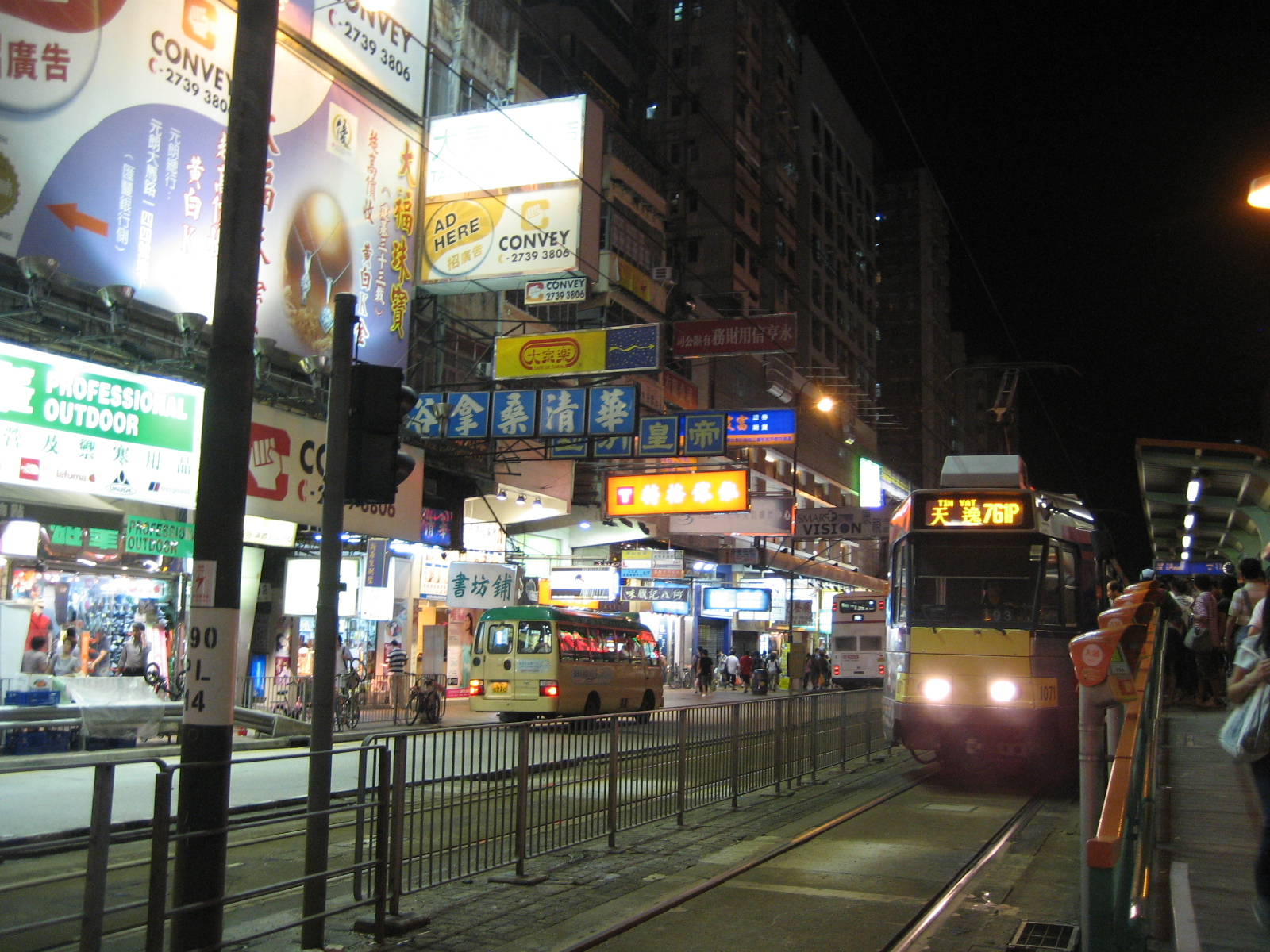
Yuen Long Town at night, spotting a Light Rail Vehicle stopping at Tai Tong Road stop.

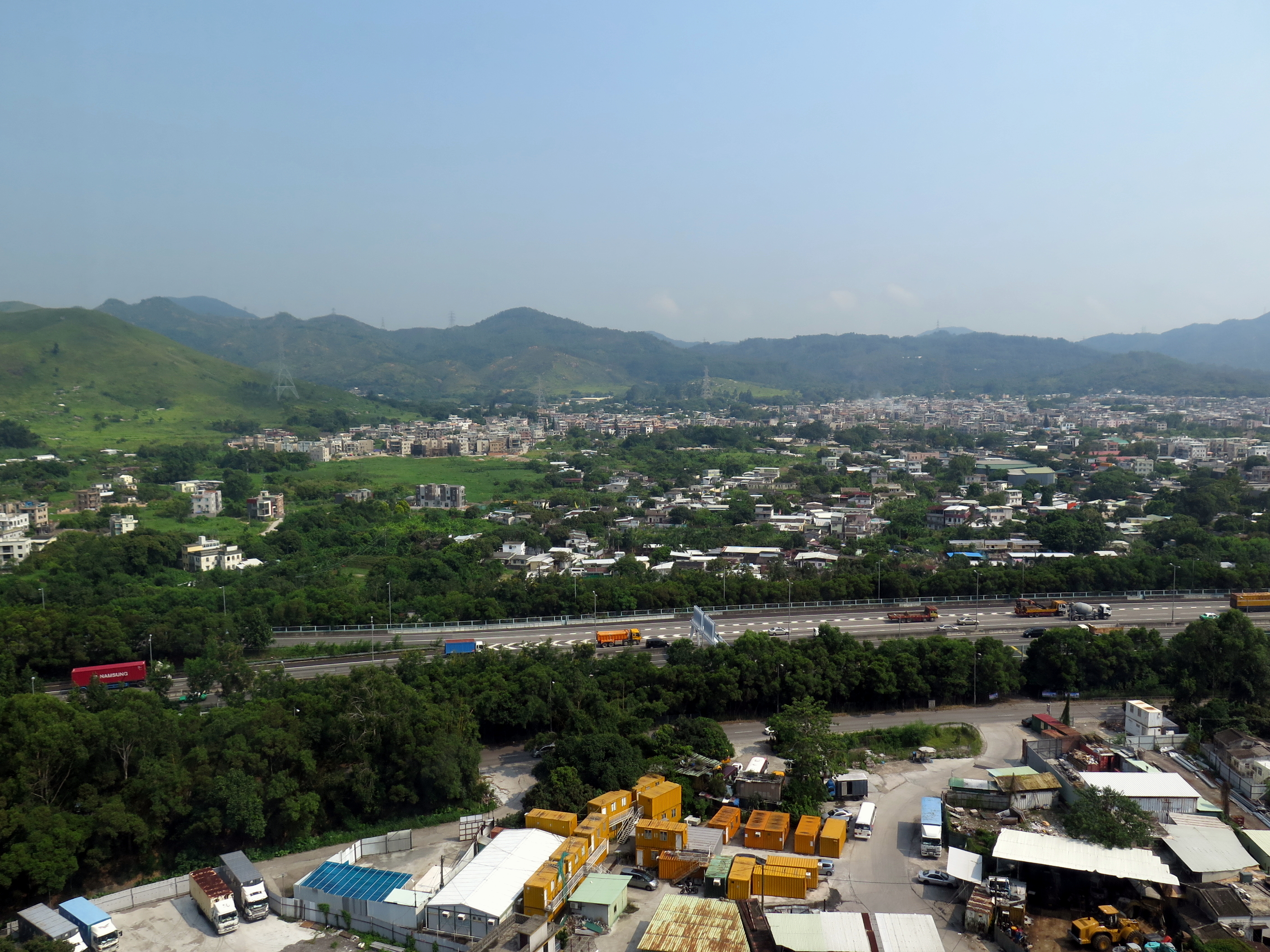
Shap Pat Heung

Yuen Long Town is located in the centre of Yuen Long. It was built on granite and is divided into an eastern part and a western part by the Shan Pui River; it is also divided into a northern part and a southern part by Castle Peak Road.

The most prosperous part of Yuen Long Town is to the east of Shan Pui River, near Castle Peak Road. Many different types of shops and office buildings can be found there, gaining the nickname "Mong Kok of the west".

== History ==
Yuen Long Town was called Un Long Hui early in the 20th century. It was the main market town in Yuen Long at the time, located in the urban heart of Yuen Long. After the development of Yuen Long New Town, the name "Yuen Long Town" has been used only occasionally. Nevertheless, big companies like Kowloon Motor Bus, and the District Council still use "Yuen Long Town". Some road signs still have "Yuen Long Town" on them, but most of those were erected in the 1990s. Most of the road signs now use "Yuen Long" instead of "Yuen Long Town".

Yuen Long Town developed from Yuen Long Kau Hui (literally Yuen Long Old Market) and Yuen Long San Hui (literally Yuen Long New Market). In 1972, the government included Yuen Long Town into the Government's town expansion scheme. Many buildings sprang up at the time, leading to a high number of buildings over 20 years old in Yuen Long Town.

Since 1978, Yuen Long New Town has been built over the original Yuen Long Town, with the New Town being the district centre of the New Territories northwest. Many new facilities, for example the Yuen Long Police Station, the Yuen Long Town Hall, and the Yuen Long Stadium, were built on the lesser developed western side of the Shan Pui River.

== Transport ==
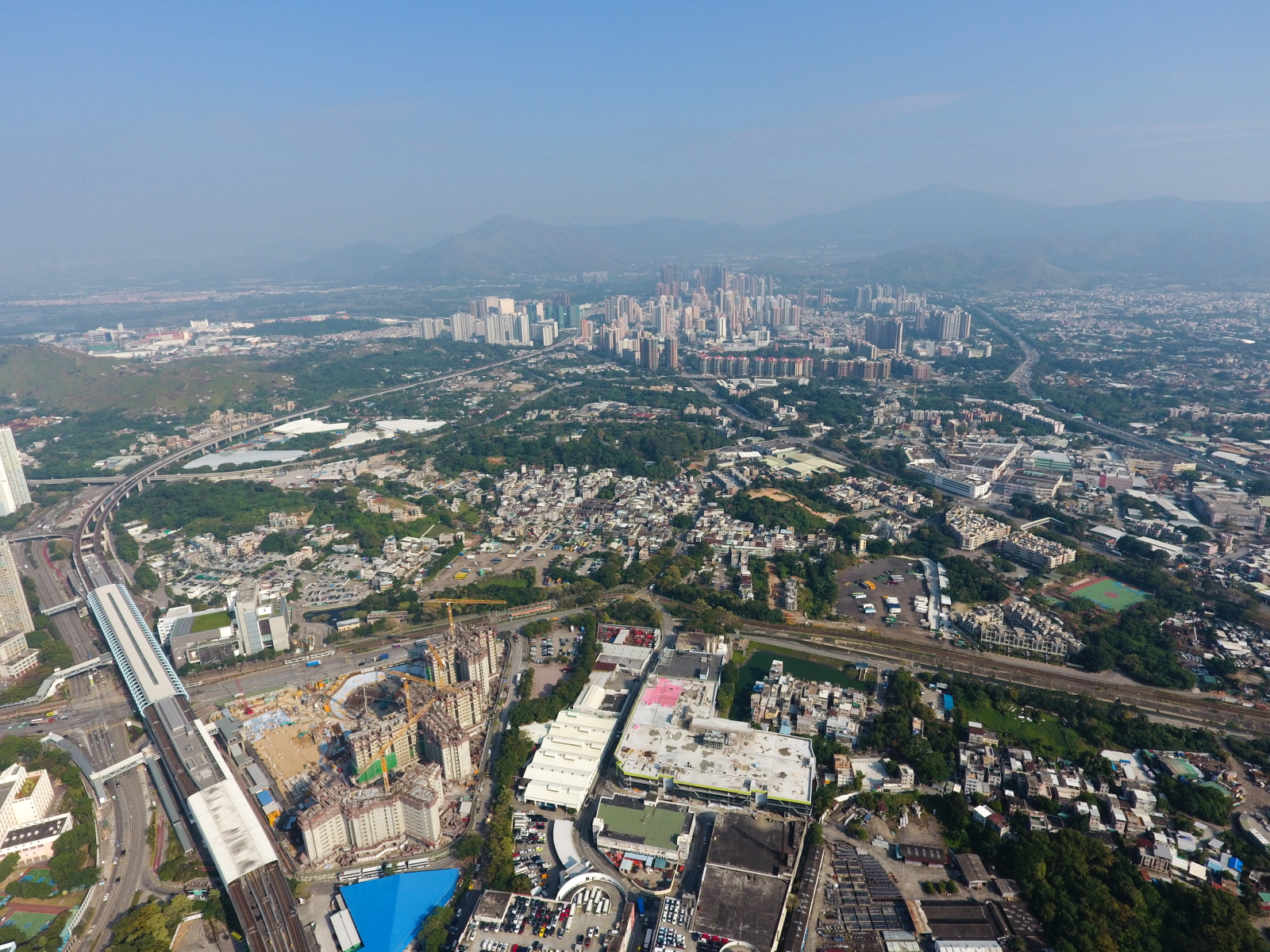
A panoramic view of Yuen Long Town – to the left is Long Ping Estate, to the right is Yuen Long Centre and the foreground is Tin Shui Wai station

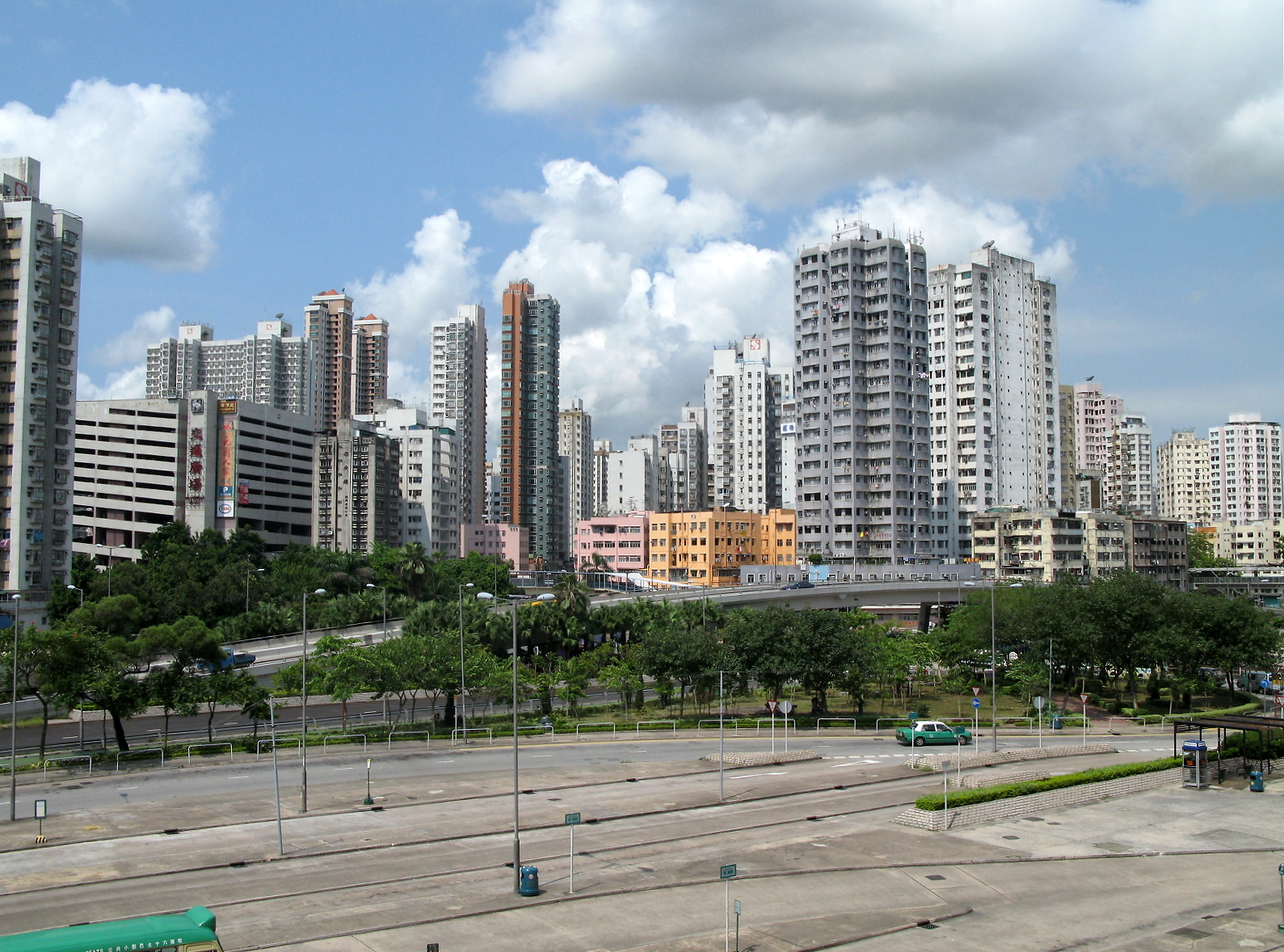
Yuen Long (East) bus terminus at Yuen Long Town

In the past, Yuen Long Town relied on main roads like Castle Peak Road, Tuen Mun Road, Lam Kam Road, Route Twisk and Route 9. The Yuen Long Highway and the San Tin Highway are used to connect to other areas in Hong Kong.

However, because of the dependence upon Castle Peak Road and Tuen Mun Road, an accident on either road would put traffic to a complete standstill. However, after the completion of Route 3 (via Tai Lam Tunnel) in 1998, the traffic improved by a great deal and many destinations could be reached in reduced time.

=== Main roads ===
- Castle Peak Road
- Yuen Long Highway

=== Public transport ===
==== Rail ====
Since 1988, the Light Rail has been serving the area between Tuen Mun and the heart of Yuen Long, having been an essential part of everyday life for commuters. In December 2003, West Rail line went into operation. It only takes around 20 minutes for residents in Yuen Long Town to go to Nam Cheong, near Sham Shui Po. In August 2009, West Rail line extend to Hung Hom, via Austin and East Tsim Sha Tsui. In June 2021, the West Rail line combined with the Ma On Shan line and become the Tuen Ma line.

==== Bus ====
Yuen Long is served by many bus routes, mostly operated by the KMB.

==== Daytime services ====
- Tuen Ma line
  - Long Ping station, Yuen Long station
- Light Rail
  - Five Light Rail stops (Yuen Long, Tai Tong Road, Hong Lok Road, Fung Nin Road and Shui Pin Wai), four routes (610, 614, 615, 761P) within Yuen Long Town where people can interchange with West Rail line at Yuen Long.
- Buses
  - KMB: 53, 54, 64K, 68, 68A, 68E, 68F, 68M, 68X, 76K, 77K, 264R, 268A, 268B, 268C, 268P, 268X, 269D, 276, 276P, 869, 968 (harbour crossing), 968A (harbour crossing), 968X (harbour crossing), B1 (boundary crossing)
  - MTR Bus: K65, K66, K68, K73, K74
  - LWB: A36, A37, E36, E36A, E36P, E36S
  - NLB: B2 (boundary crossing)
- Public light bus
  - Green minibuses
    - 31, 32, 33, 34, 35, 36, 37, 38, 39, 44B, 71, 72, 73, 74, 74A, 75, 76, 77, 78, 601, 602, 603, 604, 605, 608, 609, 611, 612
  - Red minibuses
    - Yuen Long to Tuen Mun (Chi Lok Fa Yuen), Jordan, Sheung Shui (via Castle Peak Road or Fan Kam Road), Sheung Tsuen (via Kam Tin Road or Kam Sheung Road), Tai Tong, Tai Po, Tsuen Wan, Lok Ma Chau and Kwun Tong.

==== Overnight services ====
- Buses
  - KMB: N269
  - LWB: N30, NA36
  - Harbour crossing: N368
- Public light bus
  - Green minibus: 606S, 607S, 610S, 616S

==== Taxis ====
Yuen Long is served by urban red taxis and NT green taxis. The red taxis provide service to Kowloon and Hong Kong Island, whereas the green taxis provide connections within NT. Both types make connections to Hong Kong International Airport.

== Public housing ==
- Yuen Long Estate

== Education ==
Yuen Long Town Centre (East) is in Primary One Admission (POA) School Net 74. Within the school net are multiple aided schools (operated independently but funded with government money) and one government school: Yuen Long Government Primary School (元朗官立小學).

== See also ==
- Yuen Long District
- Yuen Long
- Yuen Long New Town
- Tuen Ma line
  - Long Ping station
  - Yuen Long station
