= Yuen Long Theatre =

Theatre in Yuen Long, New Territories, Hong Kong

Coordinates: 22°26′29″N 114°01′22″E

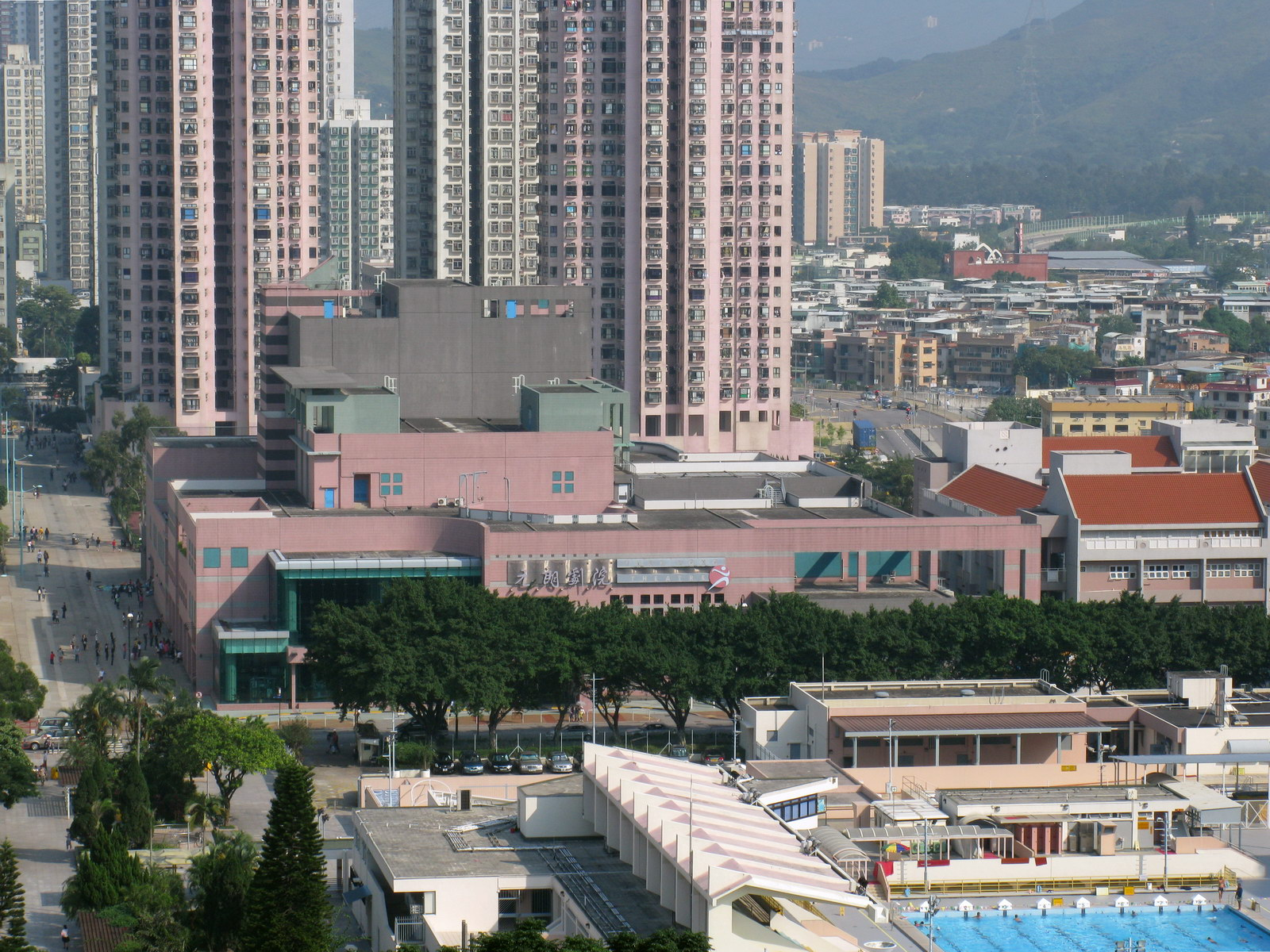
- Yuen Long Theatre
- Traditional Chinese: 元朗劇院
- Simplified Chinese: 元朗剧院
Transcriptions
Standard Mandarin
- Hanyu Pinyin: Yuán Lǎng Jùyuàn
Yue: Cantonese
- Jyutping: jyun4 long5 kek6 jyun6*2

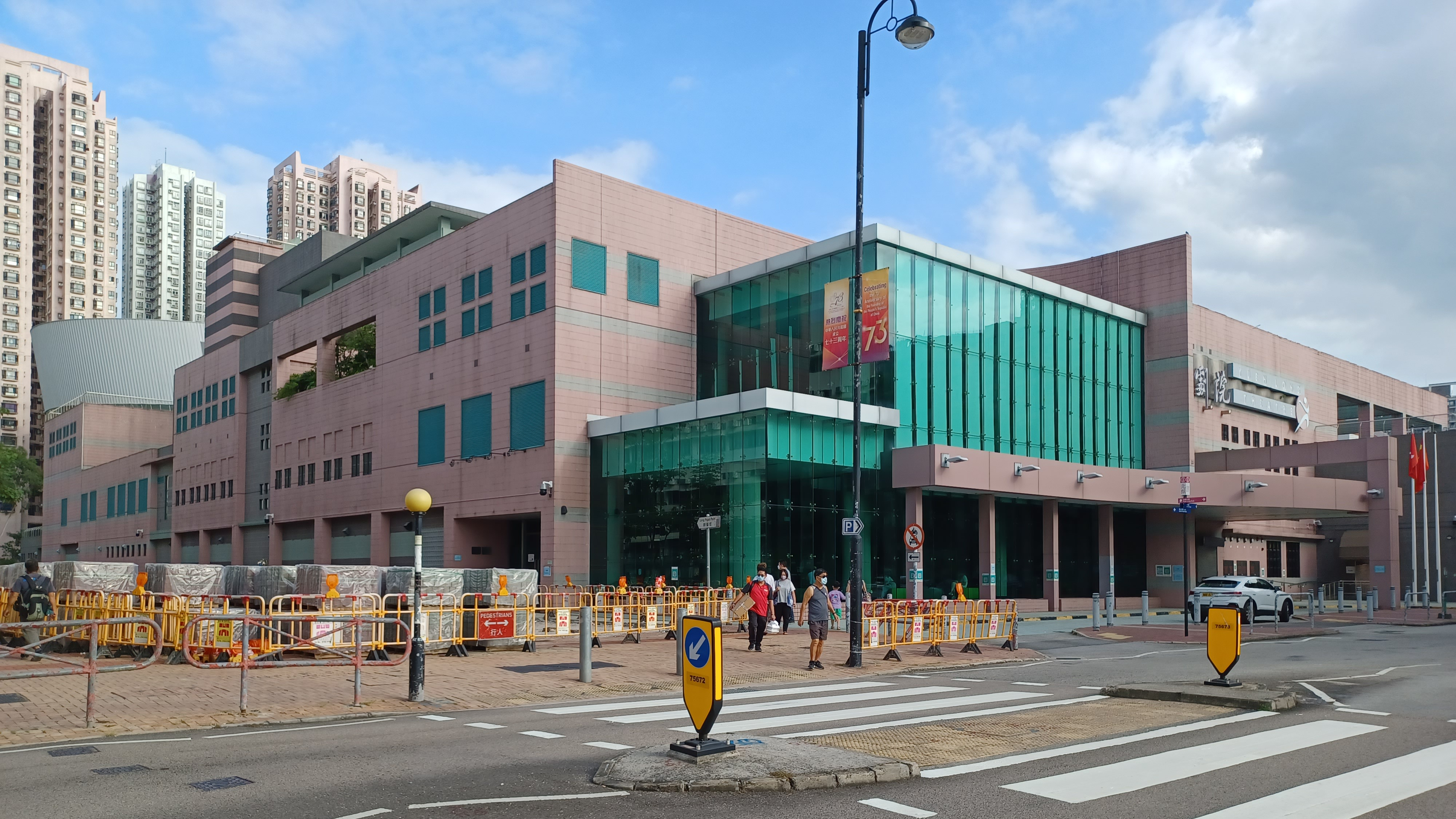
Yuen Long Theatre

Yuen Long Theatre (Chinese: 元朗劇院) is a performing arts venue situated at Yuen Long Tai Yuk Road in Yuen Long, New Territories, Hong Kong. It was opened on 14 May 2000.

== Facilities ==
The Theatre houses a 919-seat auditorium, a 180m^{2} dance studio, a 192m^{2} rehearsal room, a 117m^{2} lecture room, a 136m^{2} function room and a 120m^{2} exhibition corner.

== Auditorium ==
The main performance venue seats 919. Equipped with sound and lighting systems and many other theatrical facilities, which include 24 remote-controlled motorised drapes, a flying system which comprises more than a hundred of motorised and manual cross stage hoists, an adjustable forestage, 2-in-1 convertible orchestra shell with a film projection screen, it is suitable for a variety of programmes.
