= Hong Kong Science and Technology Parks Corporation =

Statutory body in Hong Kong

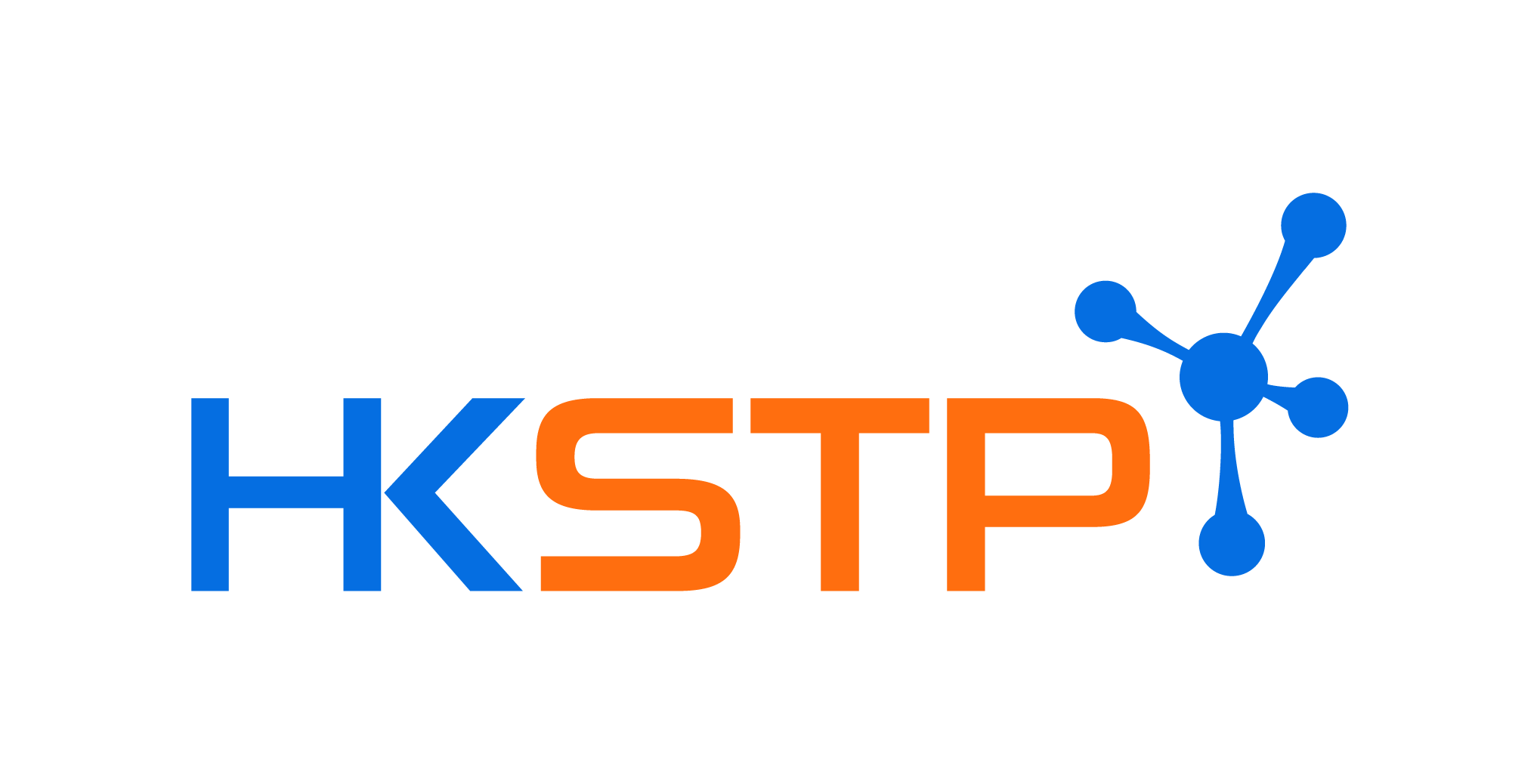
- Native name: 香港科技園公司
- Type: Statutory Body
- Industry: Science and Technology
- Founded: May 2001
- Headquarters: 5/F, Building 5E, 5 Science Park East Avenue, Hong Kong Science Park (with effect from 21 January 2019), Hong Kong
- Key people: Cordelia Chung (chairwoman)
- Website: Official website

Hong Kong Science and Technology Parks Corporation
- Traditional Chinese: 香港科技園公司
- Simplified Chinese: 香港科技园公司
Transcriptions
Standard Mandarin
- Hanyu Pinyin: Xiānggǎng Kējìyuán Gōngsī
Yue: Cantonese
- Yale Romanization: Hēung góng fō geih yùhn gūng sī
- Jyutping: Heong^{1} gong^{2} fo^{1} gei^{6} jyun^{4} gung^{1} si^{1}

The Hong Kong Science and Technology Parks Corporation (HKSTP) is a public corporation set up by the Hong Kong Government in 2001 to foster innovation and technology development in Hong Kong.

== Responsibilities ==
HKSTP manages facilities and provides value-added services for the technology, research and development sector in Hong Kong. These facilities include Hong Kong Science Park (for technology companies), InnoCentre (for design enterprises), and three industrial estates at Tai Po, Yuen Long and Tseung Kwan O as well as the Technology Incubation Programme. According to the Government, HKSTP is the 'flagship technology infrastructure' in Hong Kong. Considerable R&D office space (330,000 square metres) and job opportunities (15,000) are provided. By integrating research, advanced manufacturing and financing resources, HKSTP supports approximately 2,400+ Innovation & Technology companies.

== Overview ==
HKSTP focuses on four strategic pillars: Life and Health Technology, AI and Data Science, Advanced Manufacturing and New Energy & GreenTech. As of December 2025, more than 300 Life and Health technology companies were located at Science Park.

In September 2023, HKSTP established its Hong Kong Science Park Shenzhen Branch in the Shenzhen–Hong Kong Innovation and Technology Cooperation Zone in Hetao, introducing an initial group of 16 Hong Kong technology enterprises.

HKSTP Key figures as of 28 Feb 2026:

- 25,000+ people in the HKSTP community
- 2,400+ Innovation & Technology companies
- 16,000+ R&D practitioners
- 25 countries/regions of origin for park companies
- ~3,500 graduates from our incubation programme
- ~1,350 startups supported
- 12 unicorns supported (5 home grown, 7 overseas)
- 80%+ graduated incubates still in business
- HK$165B+ raised by Park companies since FY 2018 in 480+ Investment deals
- 350+ awards received

In 2024, the Hong Kong Government announced that approximately hectares of new land designated for innovation and technology (I&T) usage in the San Tin area of the Northern Metropolis' San Tin Technopole will be progressively transferred to HKSTP for development and operation starting from 2026/27.

== Legal framework ==
Hong Kong Science and Technology Parks Corporation Ordinance (Cap. 565) takes effect at the establishment of Hong Kong Science and Technology Parks Corporation (in Chinese 香港科技園公司). The Ordinance states the functions, purposes, rights and obligations of HKSTP. As HKSTP is the merger of the Hong Kong Industrial Estates Corporation, the Hong Kong Industrial Technology Centre Corporation and the Provisional Hong Kong Science Park Company Limited, it has inherited the rights, obligations, assets and liabilities of the above organisations.

Section 8 of the Ordinance confers power on HKSTP to serve its purposes by means which are 'expedient', 'conducive', 'reasonably incidental' and 'consequential'. Under section 8, some examples of the power vested are acquisition of property, entering into contract and carrying out works for founding, enhancement or development of its premises.

== Internal structure ==
The Board is responsible for formulating overall strategic directions and policies of the corporation and overseeing management of the business.

The Board consists of 17 Non-Executive Directors. Among the 17 Directors are 16 Board Members and one chairperson who is currently Cordelia Chung. The chairperson is appointed by the Chief Executive of HKSAR and the board members are appointed by the Financial Secretary. All Board Members do not receive honorarium for their work. When a term of service ends, the board members may be reappointed.

The Board performs its role by devising the key strategic plan, monitoring the execution of such plan, approving the 'annual budget', 'corporate key performance indicators', '10-year financial projection' and major development plans. In particular, the Board safeguards HKSTP from potential risks by making sure effective controls are in practice.

The Board supervises five standing Committees, namely Business Development and Admission Committee, Finance and Administration Committee, Projects and Facilities Committee, Audit Committee, as well as Senior Staff Administration Committee. Investment Committee and two subsidiary companies namely were set up in 2015.

Investment Committee and two subsidiary companies, namely STP Corporate Venture Limited and STP Asset Holding Limited, which were set up in 2015. The two subsidiary companies are the investment holding companies of the Corporate Venture Fund. They are responsible for the administering of the Fund and reporting to the Finance and Administrative Committee regularly. The Investment Committee supervises the work of Corporate Venture Fund and approves its investment and divestment decisions.

== Finance ==
The Hong Kong Government is the sole shareholder of HKSTP. The Financial Secretary may inject equity into the authorized capital of HKSTP by publishing in the Gazette. At the same time, HKSTP may issue its share to the Government.

HKSTP says it will operate according to "prudent commercial principles". Their plan is for the Hong Kong Government to not need to continually fund the HKSTP.

HKSTP plans to send annual financial reports to the Secretary. The Secretary in turn sends a copy of the financial reports to the Legislative Council (LegCo).

In March 2018, Paul Chan Mo-po announced HK$40 billion funding for the science park, including HK$20 billion for building in the Lok Ma Chau Loop the first phase of the Hong Kong-Shenzhen Innovation and Technology Park, owned by HKSTP; and HK$10 billion allocated to the park for supporting its tenants and building infrastructure and facilities.

In October 2018, HKSTP announced the launch of the first phase of roll-outs utilising the HK$10 billion funding support provided by the HKSAR Government.

=== Financial position of HKSTP on 31 March 2018 ===
| Items | Amount (HK$) |
| Surplus and total comprehensive income for the year | $148.958 m |
| Net Current Asset | $9.786 b |
| Total Equity | $15.463 b |

== Projects ==
=== Current projects ===
HKSTP currently manages and operates the following:

- Hong Kong Science Park
- Three Industrial Estates (including Tai Po, Tseung Kwan O and Yuen Long Industrial Estate)
- GMP Centre
- Precision Manufacturing Centre
- MARS Centre
- Data Technology Hub (DT Hub)
- Advance Manufacturing Centre (AMC)
- Microelectronics Centre (MEC)
- InnoCentre
- InnoCell
- INNOPOLE
- Hong Kong Science Park Shenzhen Branch

HKSTP has also held a number of programmes:

- Ideation
- Incubation and Incu-Bio
- Co-Acceleration
- Elite
- Startups Co-Development
- Startups Upskill Programme

== Controversies ==
HKSTP has faced criticism that the development of Hong Kong Science Park is a white elephant. Legislative councillor Lam Tai-fai stated that the cost of the first stage and second stage of construction of the Park were 2.9 billion and 3.8 billion respectively. He cast doubt over the soaring construction cost of the Park. Another councillor Regina Ip argued that HKSTP had prioritised the outlook of the infrastructure over the construction cost which leads to high rental rate and management fee. She raised the icon building, "Gold Egg" as an example. In response to such comments, Rita Lau, the Secretary for Commerce and Economic Development emphasized that they did not consider the outlook as a top priority and a considerable portion of construction cost was spent on high-tech laboratories and sterile rooms which are necessary for the purposes of the Park.

Fanny Law, the previous chairperson of the Board of HKSTP, responded to the 'white elephant' claim and affirmed the value of HKSTP by sharing the viewpoint of Tien Chan-Lin. Tien Chan-Lin is a former University of California Berkeley chancellor who pushed forward the establishment of Hong Kong Science Park in late 1990s. He once raised that the Government should be responsible for the availability of comprehensive and continuous support to the research and development sector at different levels. However, Law acknowledged that HKSTP had not reached its full potential in both providing supports the industry at all levels and gaining support from all relevant stakeholders in the community, industry and academia.

In October 2023, officials entered HKSTP Chairperson Sunny Chai's house and found illegal unauthorized structures that were not there when he purchased the house, including a garden built on government land.
