= Shan Pui River =

River in Hong Kong

Coordinates: 22.4655°N 114.0286°E

- Chinese: 山貝河
- Cantonese Yale: sāan bui hòh
Transcriptions
Yue: Cantonese
- Yale Romanization: sāan bui hòh
- Jyutping: saan1 bui3 ho4

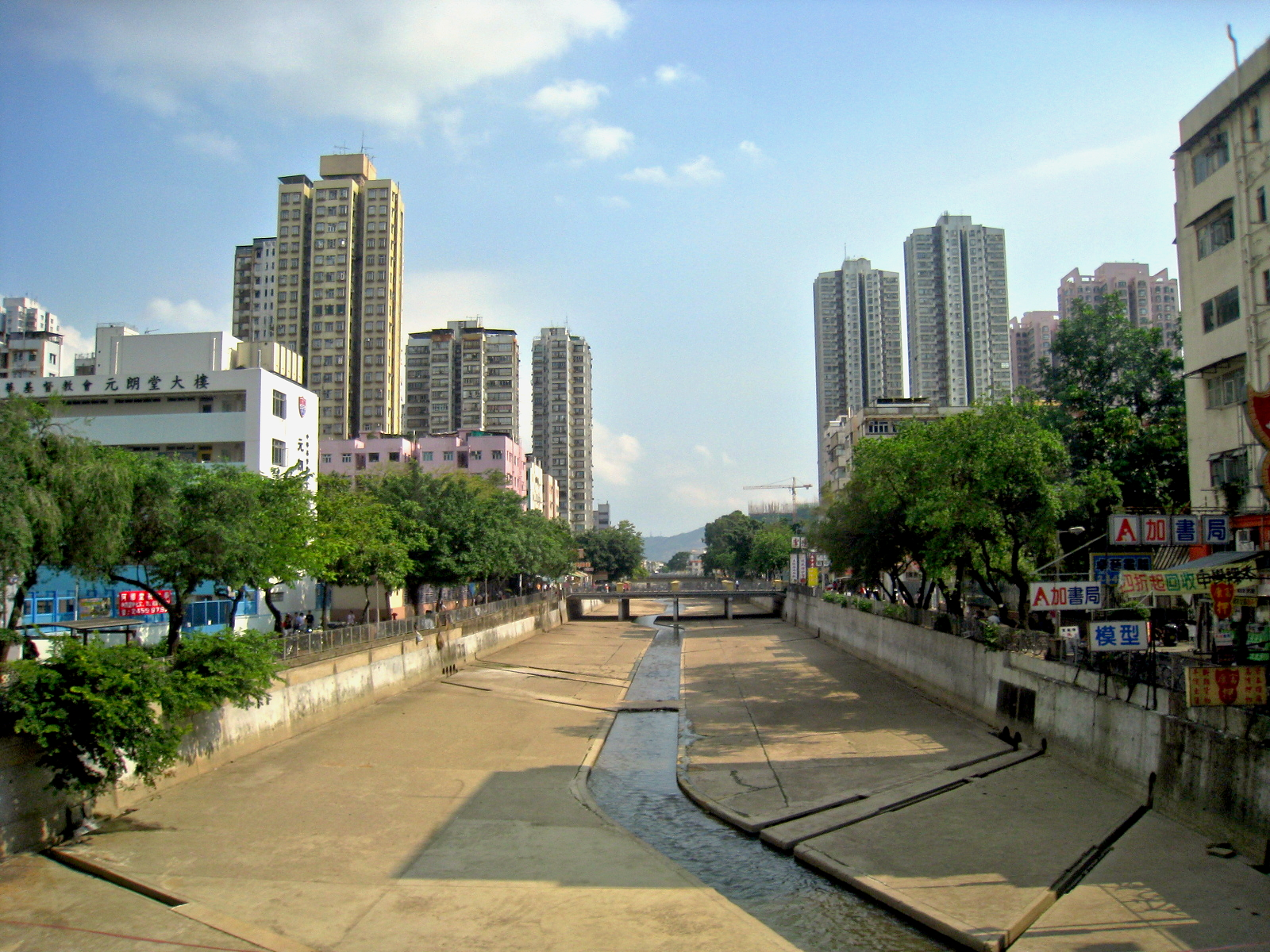
Shan Pui River passing through Yuen Long

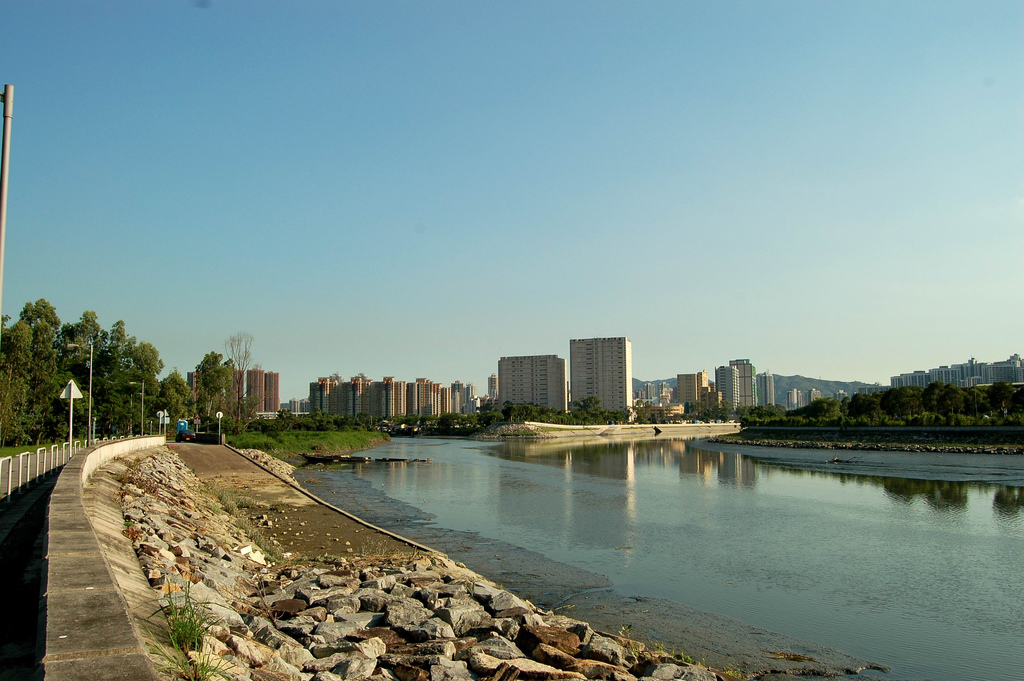
Shan Pui River near Yuen Long Industrial Estate

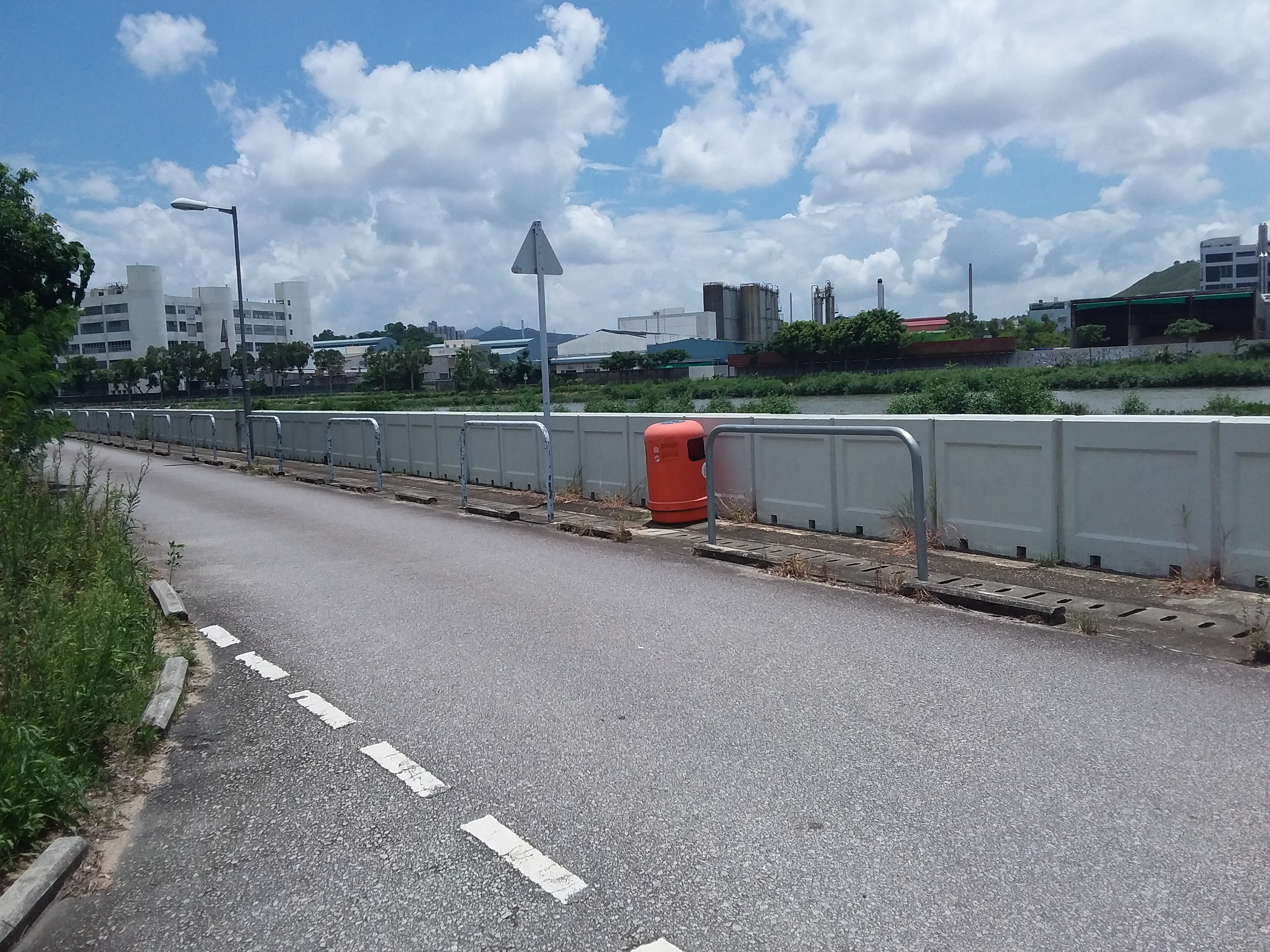
Yuen Long Industrial Estate viewed from Nam Sang Wai Road across Shan Pui River.

The Shan Pui River (also known as Yuen Long Creek) (Chinese: 山貝河) is a river in Yuen Long, New Territories, Hong Kong. It has many tributaries, most of them starting from inside Tai Lam Country Park. It passes six villages and is joined by a few more streams. After flowing through Yuen Long Town, it continues northeast into Yuen Long Industrial Estate and Nam Sang Wai. The Kam Tin River flows into it on the way. It eventually empties into the Mai Po Nature Reserve and then Deep Bay.

== Crocodile ==
The river was at the centre of attention in November 2003, when a 1.5 metre-long female crocodile was found in the river near Nam Sang Wai. It attracted many people to the village, all wanting to see the once-in-a-lifetime sight.

Many efforts were made to catch the crocodile, but it was not until over six months later, in June 2004, that it was caught. Afterwards, the AFCD and RTHK held a naming contest for the crocodile. On 12 August 2004, the crocodile was named Pui Pui (貝貝), a transliteration of the Chinese characters, meaning that it came from the Shan Pui River.

Pui Pui was housed in Kadoorie Farm for a little over two years. It was moved to Hong Kong Wetland Park in August 2006.

== See also ==
- List of rivers and nullahs in Hong Kong
- Fung Lok Wai
