= Pui Pui =

Pui Pui or Pui-Pui may refer to:

- Pui Pui (crocodile), in Hong Kong Wetland Park
- Pui-Pui (Dragon Ball), a Dragon Ball character
- Pui Pui Molcar, an anime television series
- Pui–Pui Protection Forest, in Peru
