= Oksem, Dongsolbatsem, Sesolbatsem and Namsolbatsem Islands Important Bird Area =

Coordinates: 39°27′00″N 124°37′00″E

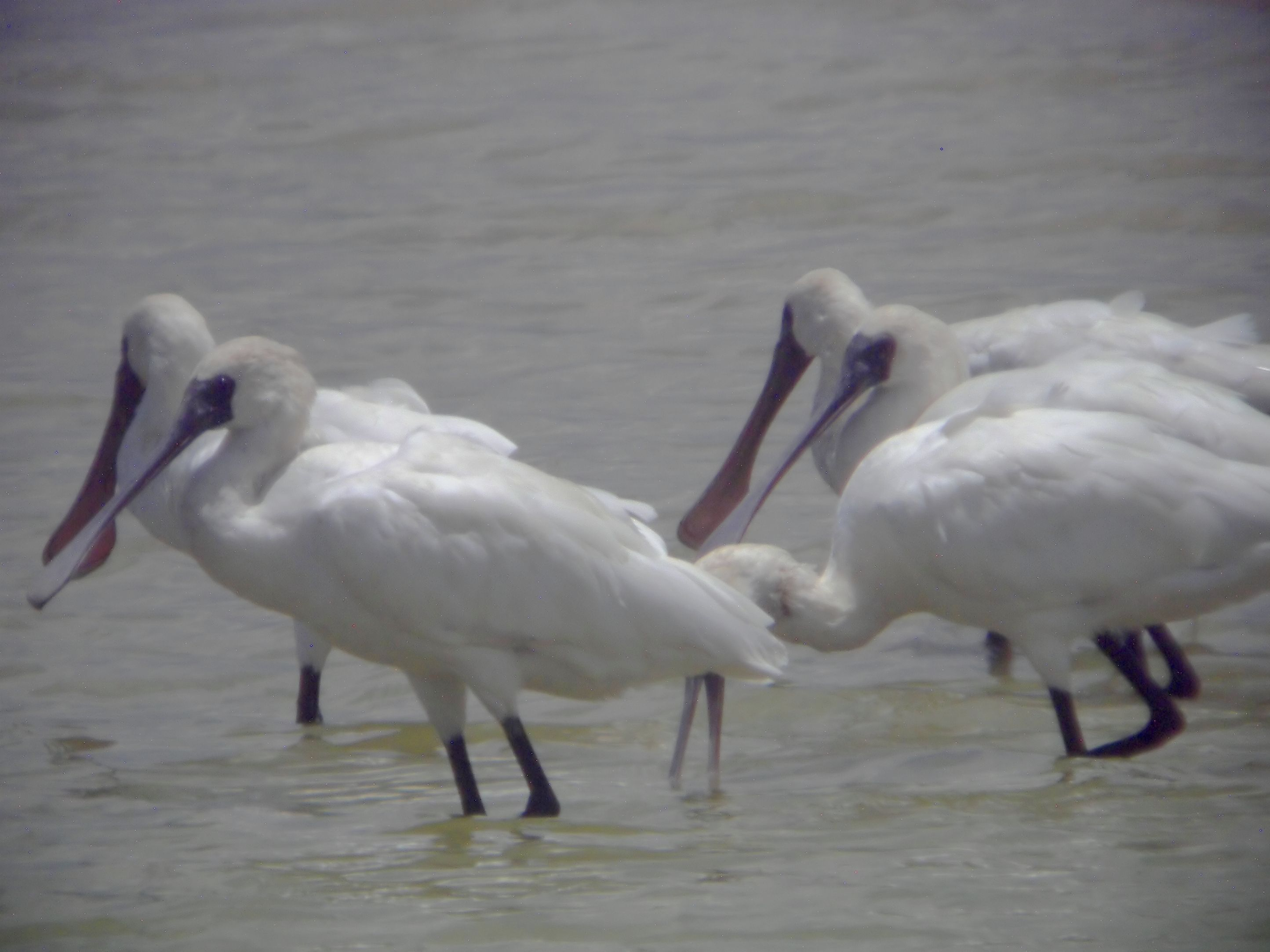
The islands are important as nesting sites for endangered black-faced spoonbills

The Oksem, Dongsolbatsem, Sesolbatsem and Namsolbatsem Islands Important Bird Area (옥섬,동솔밭섬,서솔밭섬,남솔밭섬) comprises a group of small islands, with a collective area of about 50 ha, in the north-eastern Yellow Sea, lying close to the western coast of North Korea. The site has been identified by BirdLife International as an Important Bird Area (IBA) because it supports breeding endangered black-faced spoonbills.
