= Alan Jefferies =

Australian poet and children's author (born 1957)

- Born: 29 November 1957 (age 68); Brisbane, Queensland, Australia
- Education: University of Technology, Sydney (Degrees in Communication and Writing)
- Occupations: Poet; Children's author; Librarian; Teacher
- Known for: Poetry, Children's books
- Notable work: Blood Angels: Poems 1976-1999, The Crocodile Who Wanted to Be Famous, in the same breath

Alan Jefferies (born 1957) is an Australian poet and children's author currently living in Brisbane.

== Biography ==
Alan Jefferies grew up in Cleveland on the Queensland coast. He published his first poems in 1976 and since then his work has appeared in magazines and newspapers in Australia and overseas. He holds degrees in Communication and Writing from the University of Technology, Sydney and for many years worked as a librarian and teacher at the Workers’ Educational Association, Sydney.

Between 1982 and 1992 he lived in Coalcliff south of Sydney in a house which was a meeting place for writers, poets, artists and musicians.

In 1998 he moved to Hong Kong where he lived for almost ten years. He was one of the initiators of a spoken word event called OutLoud, which takes place on the first Wednesday of each month at the Fringe Club in the Lan Kwai Fong District on Hong Kong Island. In 2002 he co-edited an anthology of work from the readings called Outloud: an anthology of poetry from OutLoud readings.

He has published six books of poetry in Australia including Blood Angels: Poems 1976-1999 (Cerberus, 1997). In October 2004 his bilingual children's book The crocodile who wanted to be famous, based on the real-life crocodile (Pui Pui) that visited Hong Kong, was published and attracted widespread interest from both the Chinese and English press.

His most recent book "in the same breath" was published by Flying Islands in 2021. His work has also been translated into Arabic, Romanian and Uzbec.

The poet Ken Bolton has recently written that Jefferies' poems "continue to evince a kind of spiritual, slightly mystical openness or suggestibility in a language that is demotic, cool-ly neutral: epiphany with no signs of struggle or effortfulness, no rhetorical war-dance".

== Bibliography ==
Poetry

- Among the living. (Glandular, 1980)
- High Jinx. (Transit, 1983)
- Writing from a bankrupt 13th principle.(Illustrated by Auguste Blackman) (Third Degree, 1990)
- Blood Angels: Poems 1976-1999. (Cerberus, 1997)
- Homage and other poems. (Chameleon, 2006)
- Seem. (translated by Iris Fan Xing) (Association of Stories in Macao and Flying Island Books, 2011)
- in the same breath. (Flying Island Books, 2021)

For children

- The Crocodile who Wanted to be Famous. (Sixth Finger, 2004)
- Well done, Max! (Longman Asia, 2004)
- What is the cat doing? (Longman Asia, 2004)
- A magic wish (Longman Asia, 2004)
