= Batoggisem, Dansem and Zamori Islands Important Bird Area =

Coordinates: 39°26′30″N 124°5′00″E

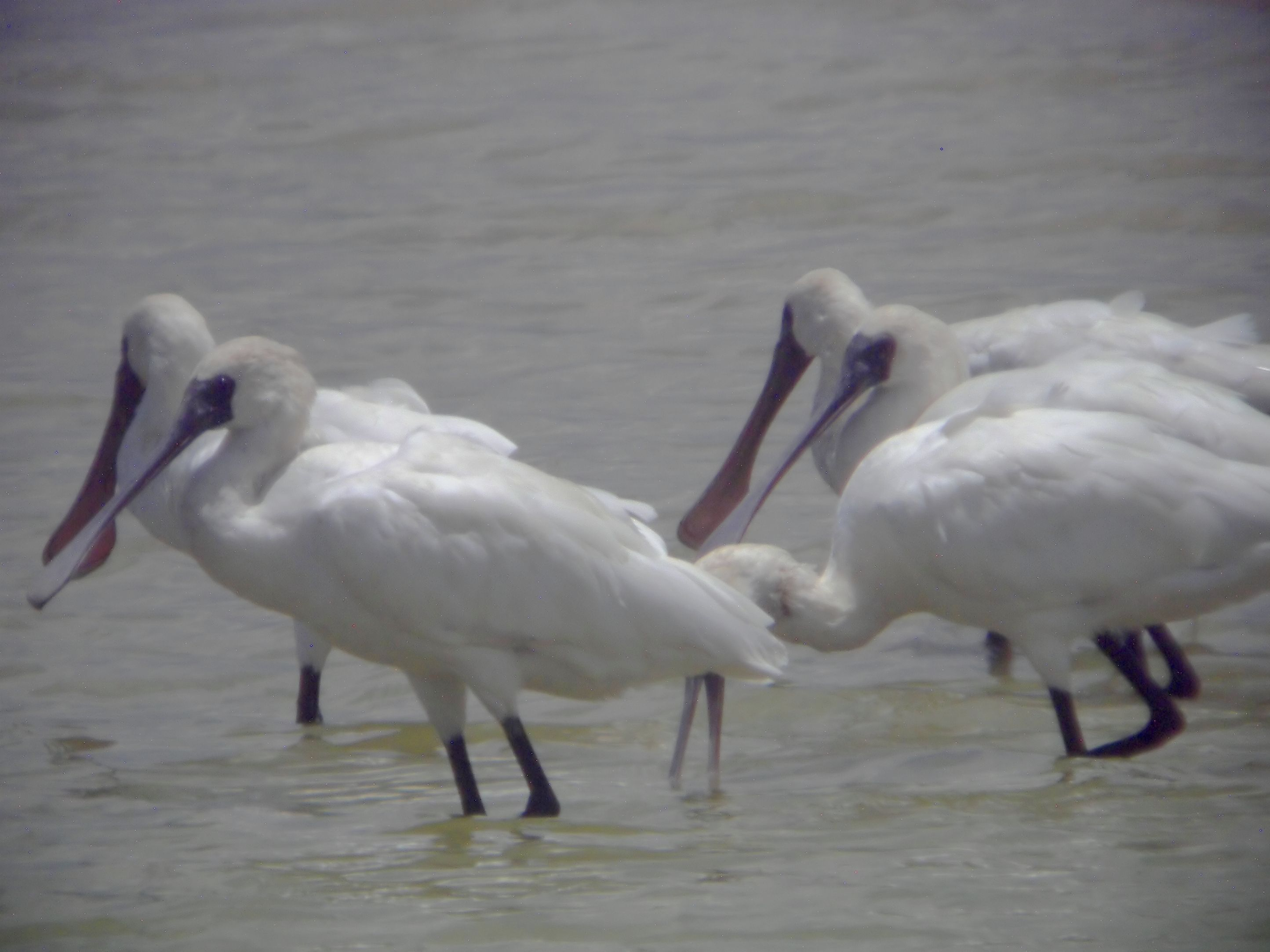
The islands are important as a breeding site for endangered black-faced spoonbills

The Batoggisem, Dansem and Zamori islands Important Bird Area (바토기섬 단섬 자머리섬) comprises three small islands, with a collective land area of about 50 ha, in the north-eastern Yellow Sea off the western coast of North Korea. Based on surveys conducted in 1997 and 1998, the site has been identified by BirdLife International as an Important Bird Area (IBA) because it supports small numbers of breeding endangered black-faced spoonbills.
