= Nam Sang Wai =

Wetland area in Hong Kong

Coordinates: 22.459978°N 114.03667°E

- Traditional Chinese: 南生圍
- Simplified Chinese: 南生围
Transcriptions
Standard Mandarin
- Hanyu Pinyin: Nánshēngwéi
Yue: Cantonese
- Yale Romanization: Nàahm sāang wàih
- Jyutping: Naam4 saang1 wai4

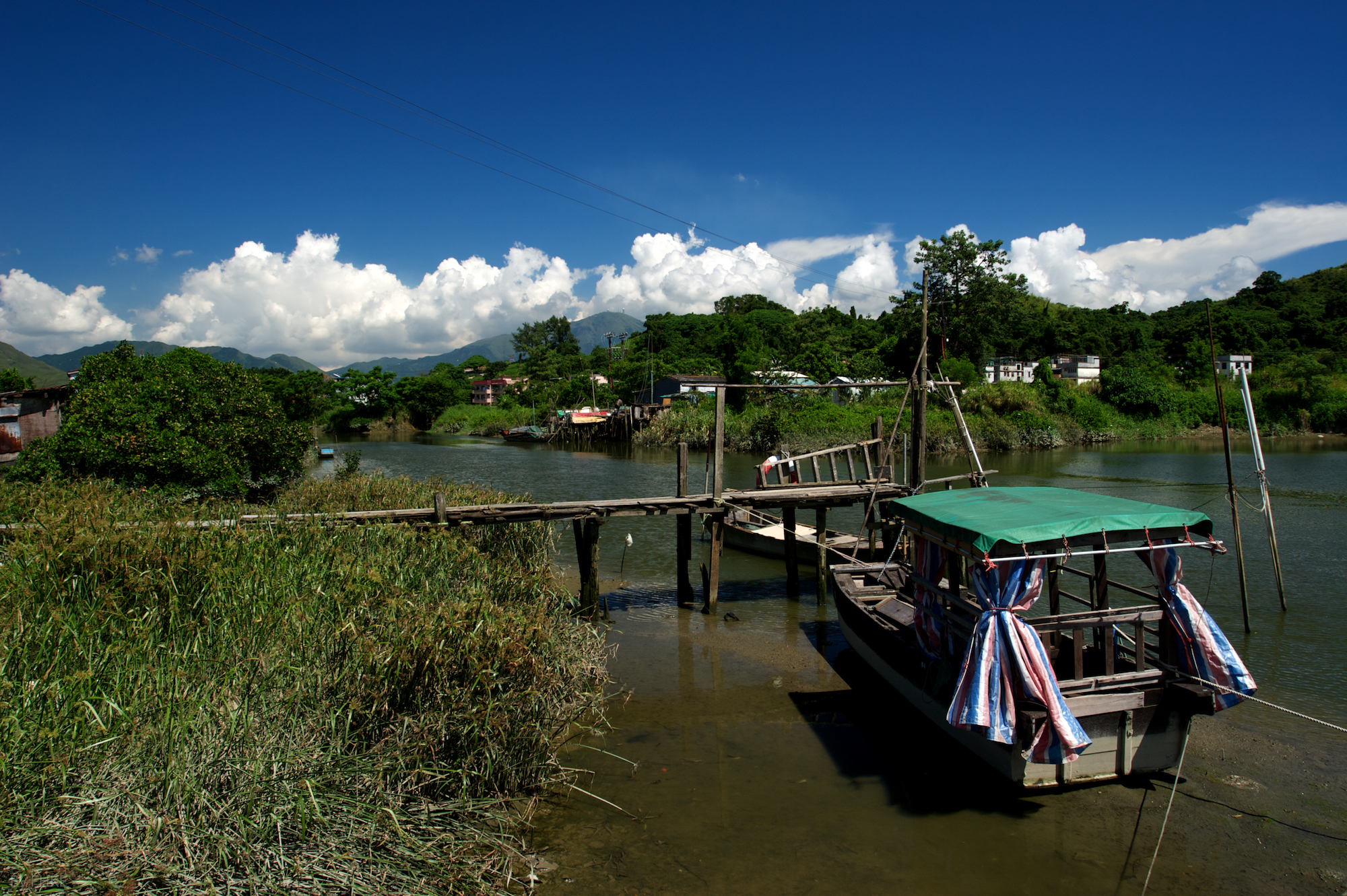
Kam Tin River in the southern part of Nam Sang Wai. The small boat is used to ferry visitors across the river.

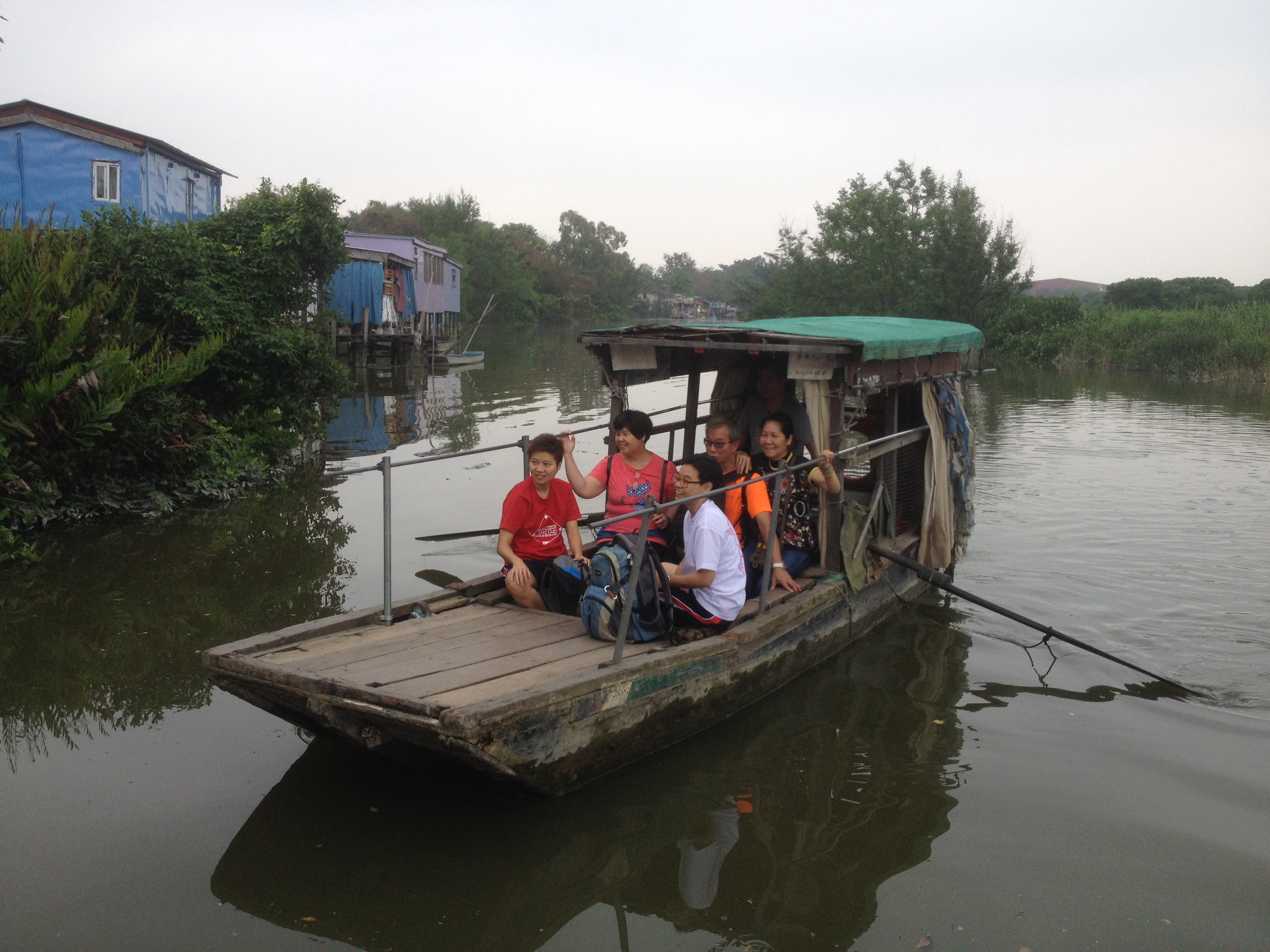
Nam Sang Wai small boat

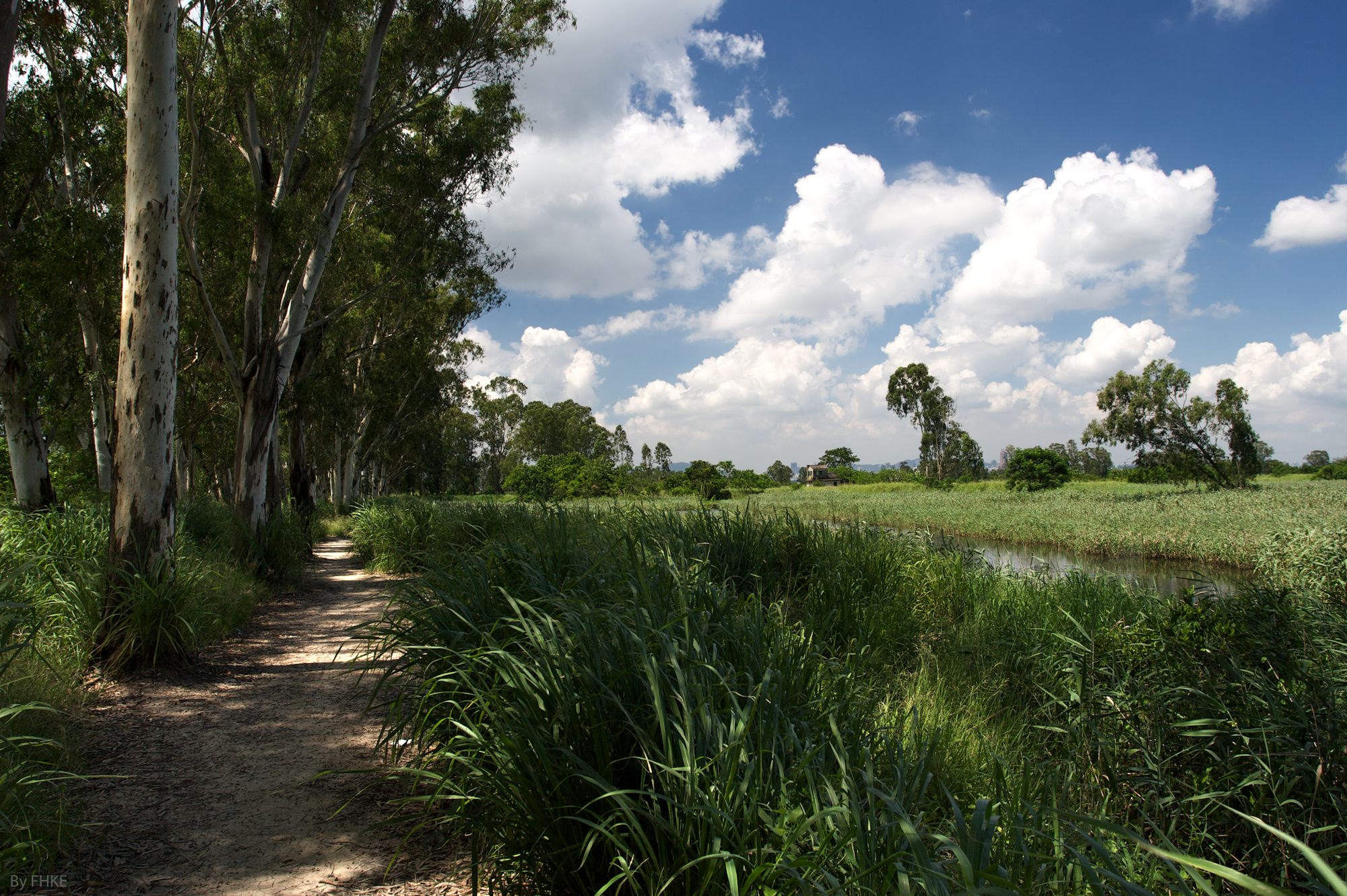
Path in the western part of Nam Sang Wai.

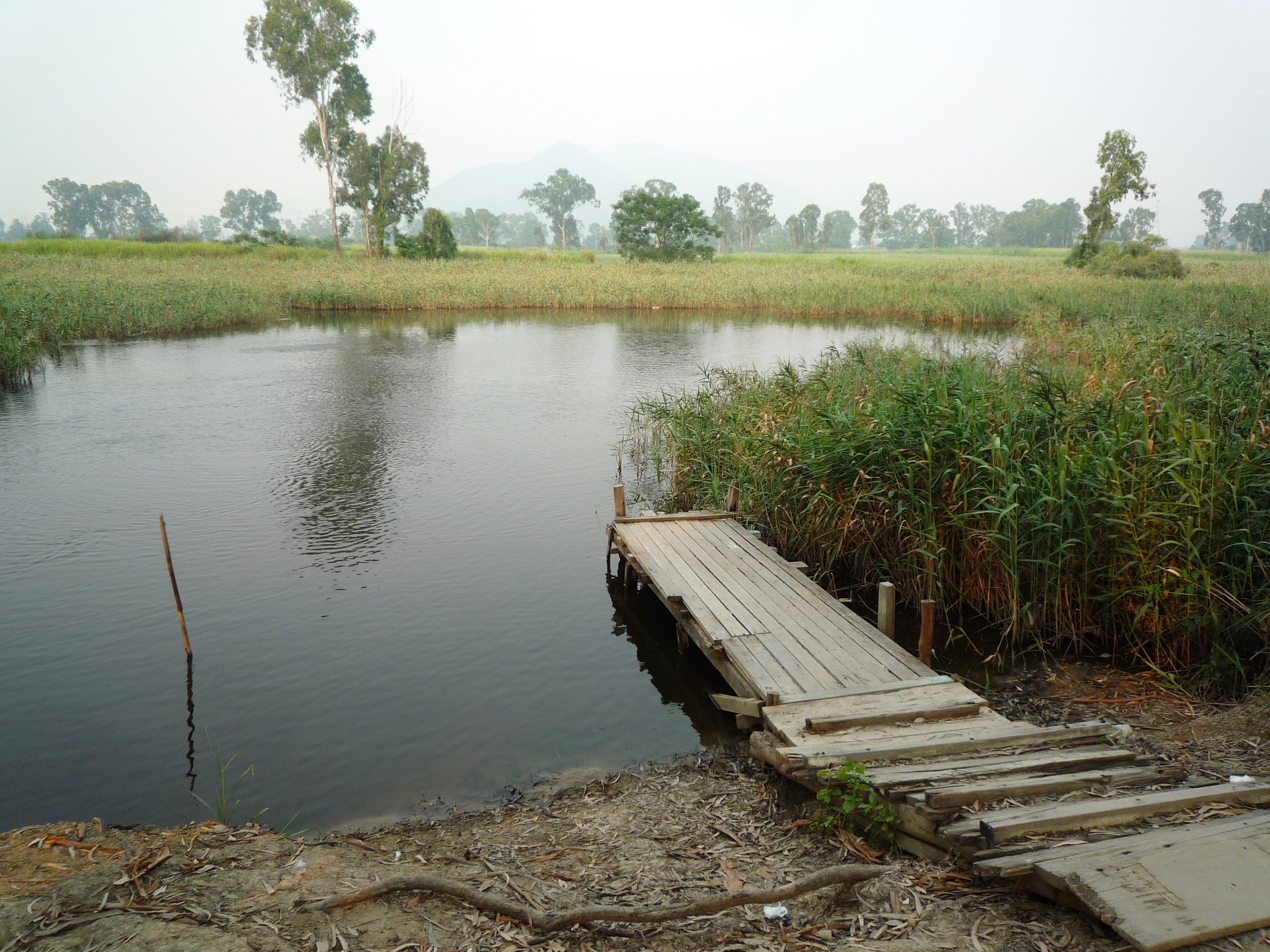
A mini pier in the vicinity.

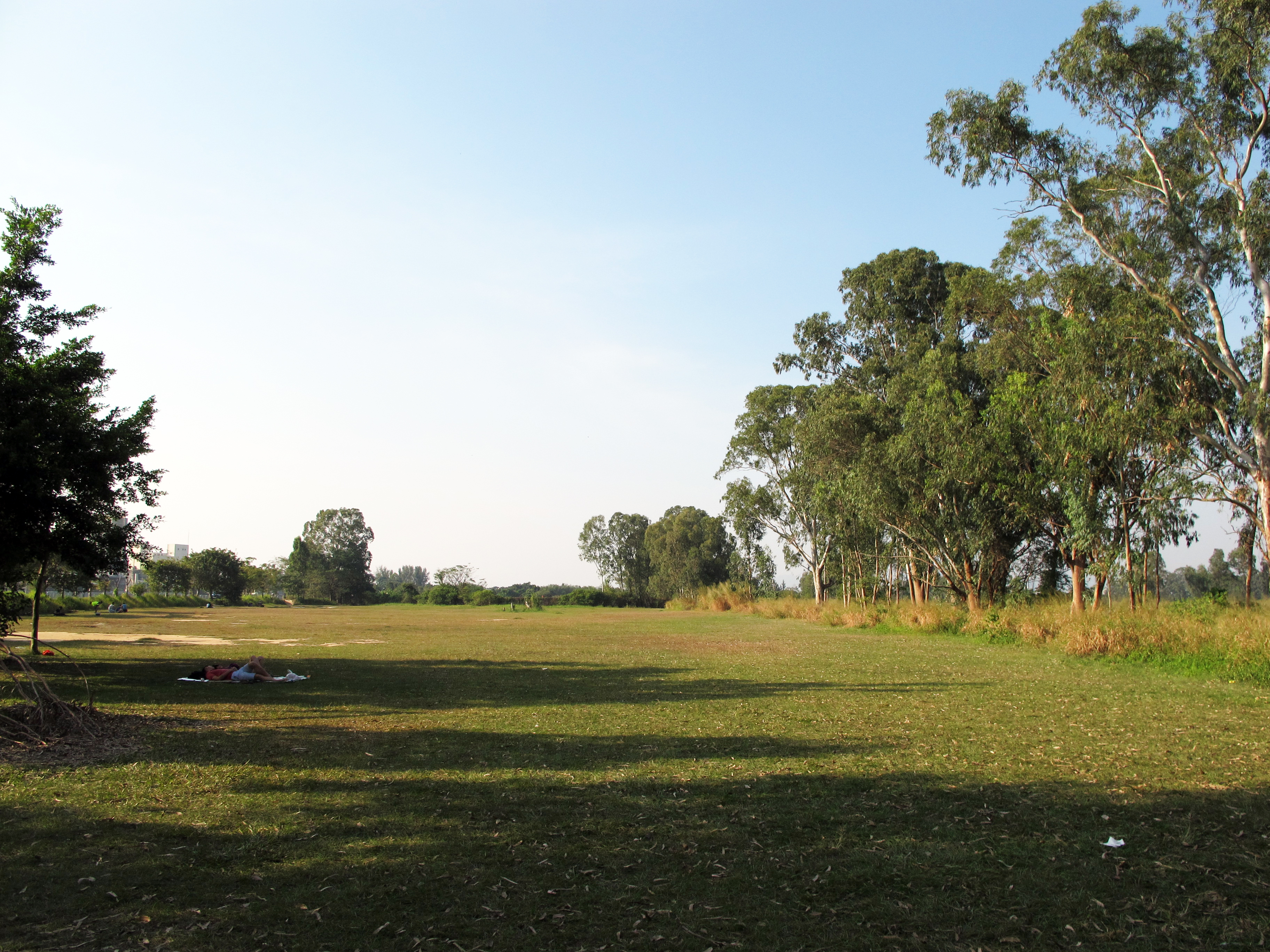
Lawn in Nam Sang Wai.

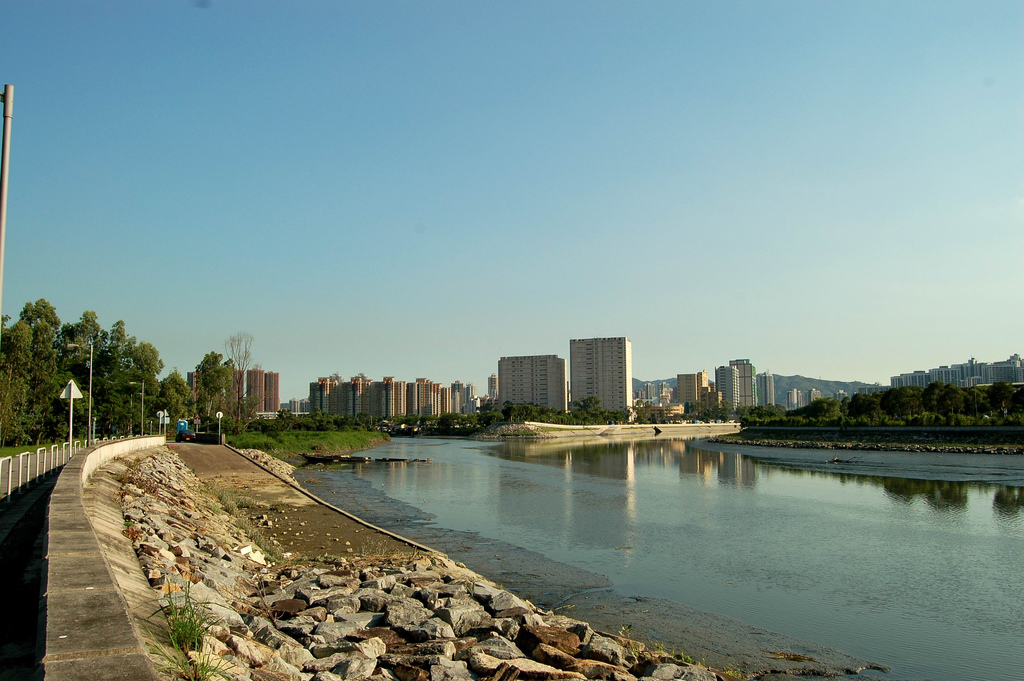
View of Shan Pui River, looking south from Nam Sang Wai Road, on the western edge of Nam Sang Wai. The area on the right, across the Shan Pui River from Nam Sang Wai, is part of Yuen Long Industrial Estate.

Nam Sang Wai is a wetland area in San Tin, New Territories, Hong Kong to the north of Yuen Long. It is considered ecologically important, and serves as a stopping place for migratory birds. It is also a popular recreational destination, especially on weekends.

Since the 1990s, various development proposals have been made at Nam Sang Wai by a consortium of Henderson Land and KHI Holdings Group. These plans have been challenged by environmentalists, politicians, the Agriculture, Fisheries and Conservation Department, the World Wildlife Fund, the Conservancy Association, and the Town Planning Board.

== Geography ==
Nam Sang Wai covers a roughly triangular area. It is bordered by the Shan Pui River in the west, separating it from Yuen Long Industrial Estate, the Kam Tin River in the east and a branch of the Kam Tin River in the south.

== Flora and fauna ==
It is home to many birds, including seagulls, northern pintails (Anas acuta), yellow-nib ducks (Anas zonorhyncha) and black-faced spoonbills (Platalea minor). Flora includes reeds and mangroves.

== Conservation ==
In what is considered to be a landmark case in the history of Hong Kong’s planning law regime, the Privy Council upheld the decision of the Town Planning Appeal Board approving development of a large scale residential, golf course, and nature reserve at Nam Sang Wai with conditions. The validity of planning permission was extended three times. In late 2010 a further extension was denied by the Town Planning Board.

The area is threatened by illegal logging and by fires (see below), on land owned by the Nam Sang Wai Development Company, that environmental advocates called "suspicious" and "professionally started".

== Recreation ==
The area is popular for recreational cycling. A proposal was made for a cycle track loop, but this has not been built.

== Development proposals ==
Nam Sang Wai has been the subject of various residential development proposals.

=== First proposal ===
In 1992, the Nam Sang Wai Development Company and Kleener Investment Limited (owned by Henderson Land Development), proposed a residential development and a golf course. The plan was originally refused by the Town Planning Board (TPB), but was accepted after the developer appealed. The plans approved in 1996 included a 43-hectare golf course and 2,550 homes.

The plans subsequently submitted by the developers were rejected by the TPB in 2010, which ruled that the proposal did not meet the conditions laid out in the earlier decision and had to be resubmitted as a fresh application owing to the substantial changes made to their plans. The developers petitioned the Town Planning Appeal Board, which ruled that the TPB had to reconsider. In turn, the TPB had this decision overthrown on judicial review. The developers then approached the Court of Final Appeal, which refused the request for appeal on 16 February 2017.

=== Second proposal ===
KHI Holdings Group, which retains 50 per cent of the Nam Sang Wai Development Company Limited (NSWD), took over the role of project manager in 2011. They put forward a new proposal.

The group has initiated the planning process under the Environmental Impact Assessment Ordinance by submitting a project profile to the Environmental Protection Department and applying for a study brief.

The NSWD recently launched a website detailing their plans for development.

=== Third proposal ===
After the second proposal was rejected, the developer put forward a new proposal, consisting of 28 high-rises (ranging in height from 19 to 25 storeys) and 140 houses to accommodate approximately 6,500 residents. For improved car access, the developer proposed a vehicular bridge spanning the Shan Pui River. It proposed compensatory measures in response to the ecological damage the proposal would inflict on the environment.

The Agriculture, Fisheries and Conservation Department (AFCD) responded that it considered "avoidance of any ecological impact as a priority ahead of compensation". It opposed the plans, stating that the development would "[encroach] on habitats of high ecological value". Likewise, WWF Hong Kong voiced opposition to the proposal. The TPB rejected this proposal on 24 February 2017. In response, the developer said it would appeal.

== Arson incidents ==
Nam Sang Wai has been subjected to repeated fires regarded as suspicious by authorities. Commentators have alleged the fires have been set by arsonists attempting to reduce the environmental value of the area.

A suspicious fire occurred in 2010. Another fire on 21 December 2016 scorched an area "larger than the size of a football pitch". A series of fires appeared again in 2018, the first two happening on 12 and 13 March. The Fire Services Department considered these suspicious, and the Hong Kong Police Force are investigating possible arson. Another fire was discovered on 22 March, followed by yet another on 2 April . A video clip later emerged in local media showing two potential witnesses at the scene, even though the Hong Kong Police said they found no CCTV footage at the site.

== Access ==
A small boat in the southern part of Nam Sang Wai serves as a ferry across the Kam Tin River towards the village of Shan Pui Tsuen, north of Yuen Long Kau Hui.

A road, the Nam Sang Wai Road, runs along the eastern edge and most of the western edge of Nam Sang Wai.

== Education ==
Nam Sang Wai is in Primary One Admission (POA) School Net 74. Within the school net are multiple aided schools (operated independently but funded with government money) and one government school: Yuen Long Government Primary School (元朗官立小學).

== See also ==
- Mai Po Marshes
- Hong Kong Wetland Park
- Fung Lok Wai
