= Hong Kong Wetland Park =

Wetland park in Hong Kong

Coordinates: 22°28′07″N 114°00′19″E

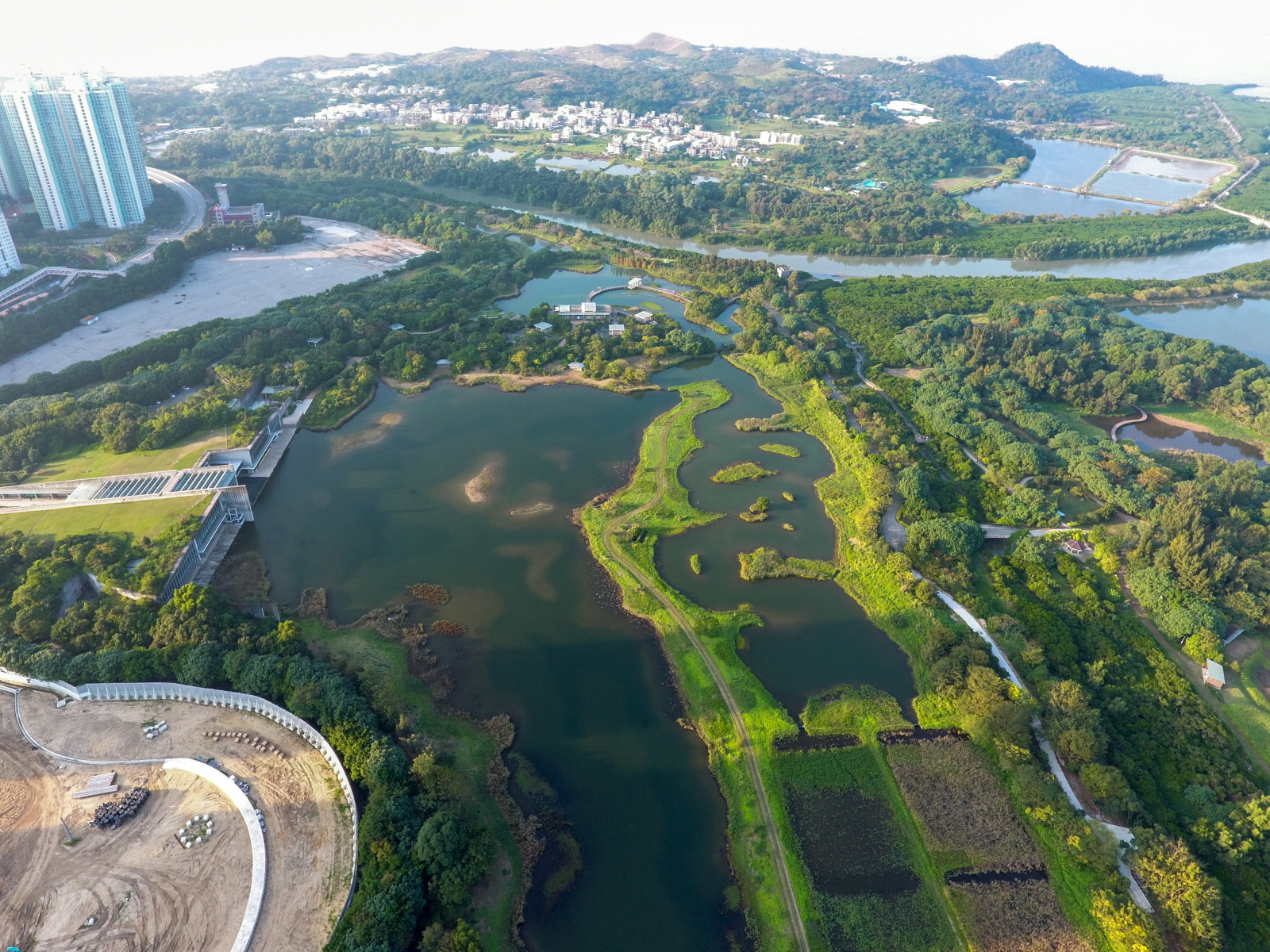
- Hong Kong Wetland Park
- Traditional Chinese: 香港濕地公園
Transcriptions
Standard Mandarin
- Hanyu Pinyin: Xiānggǎng Shīdì Gōngyuán
Yue: Cantonese
- Yale Romanization: heung1 gong2 sap1 dei6 gung1 yun4

Hong Kong Wetland Park is a conservation, education and tourism facility, located at the northern part of Tin Shui Wai, in Yuen Long. It was to be an ecological mitigation area (EMA) for the wetlands lost due to Tin Shui Wai New Town development, in the New Territories.

The Hong Kong Wetland Park comprises a 10,000-square-metre (110,000 sq ft) visitor centre, Wetland Interactive World, and a 60-hectare (150-acre) Wetland Reserve. The Wetland Interactive World has themed exhibition galleries, a theatre, a souvenir shop, an indoor play area (swamp adventure) and a resource centre.

== History ==
In 1998, a project named International Wetland Park and Visitor Centre Feasibility Study was initiated by the Agriculture, Fisheries and Conservation Department and the Hong Kong Tourism Board with a view to expanding the ecological mitigation area to a wetland ecotourism attraction. After concluding that it was feasible to develop a Wetland Park at the site without compromising its ecological mitigation functions, and that development of the Wetland Park would also enhance the ecological function of the site to a conservation, education and tourism facility, the concerned parties started the Wetland Park Project, which is one of the Millennium projects of the Administrations.

In 2007, the park was one of five winners of the Awards for Excellence: Asia Pacific Competition, from the Urban Land Institute.

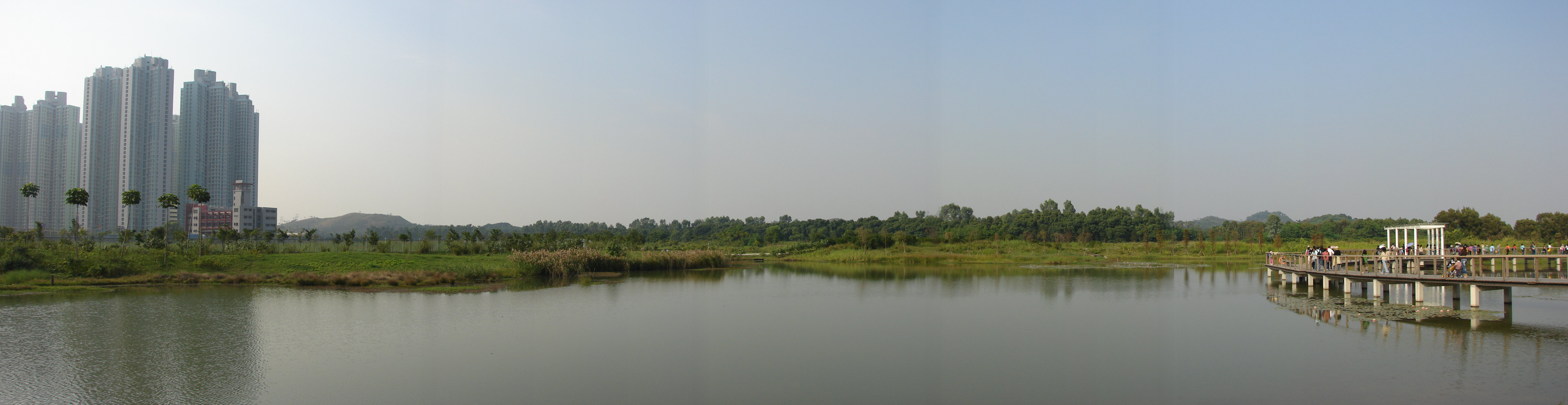
Panoramic view of the park

== Facilities ==
Themed exhibition galleries with floor areas ranging from 250 to 1,200 square metres (2,700 to 12,900 sq ft) showcase the importance of wetland on biodiversity, civilisation and conservation. Visitors can learn more about the native flora and fauna of Hong Kong through the animals and models displayed in the Living Wetland Gallery, such as false gharial, mouse deer and green turtle.

Crabs found in Wetland indoor Aquarium

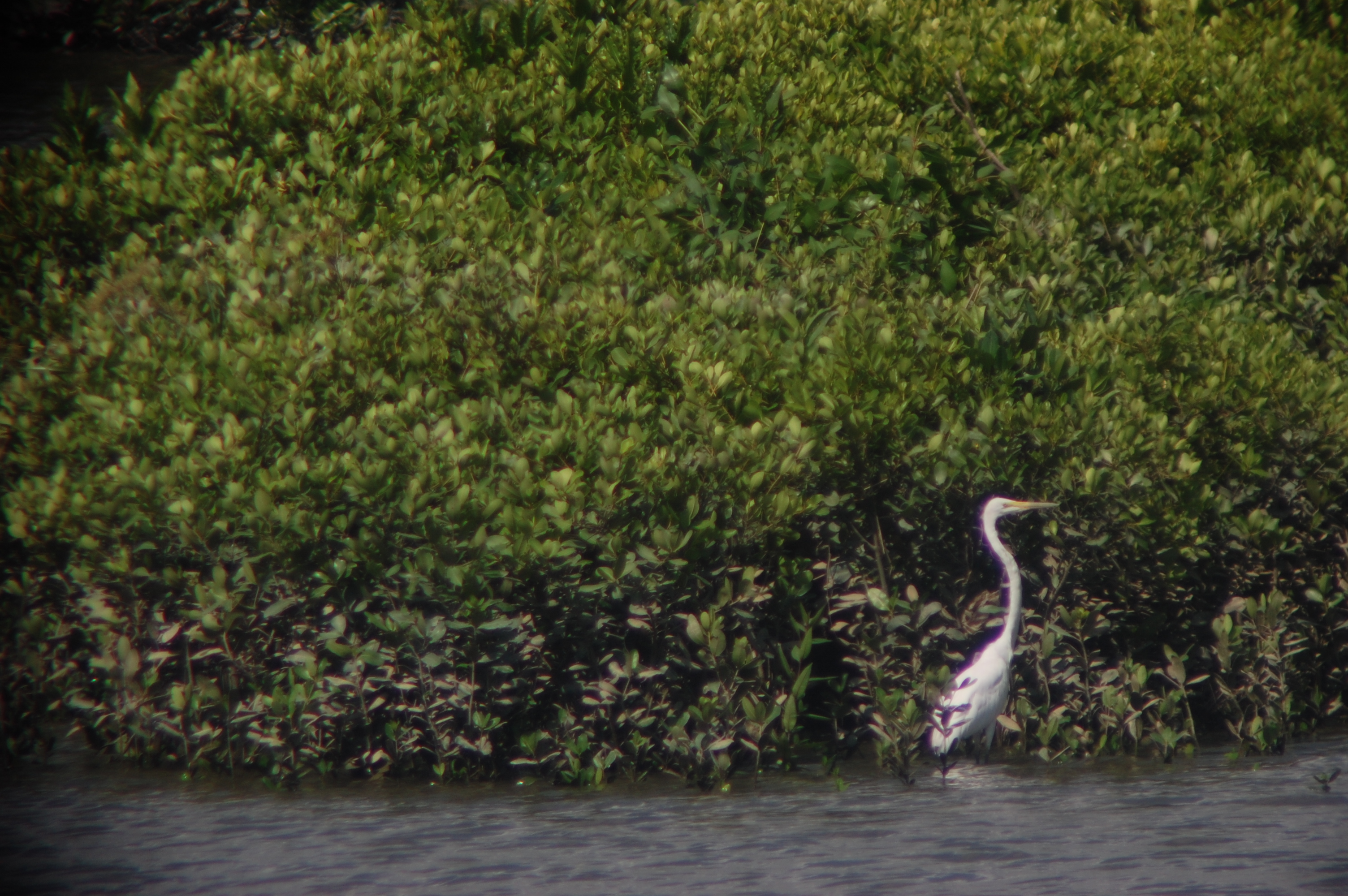
A view from the telescope found in the Wetland Bird Watch Tower

The Wetland Reserve consists of re-created habitats designed for water fowls and other wildlife. The Wetland Discovery Centre, located in the Wetland Reserve, provides visitors more hands-on experience on local wetlands. Other facilities include Stream Walk, Succession Walk, Mangrove Boardwalk and three bird hides situated next to the fish pond, mudflat and riverside, leading visitors to venture habitats of wildlife such as fiddler crab, mudskipper and the rare black-faced spoonbill.

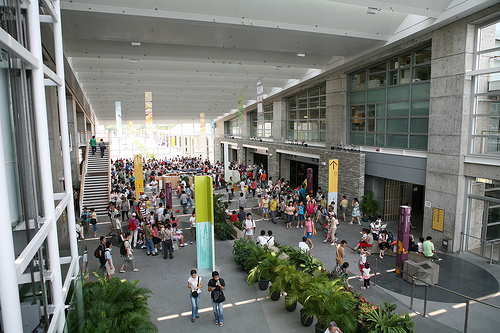
Visitor Centre Lobby

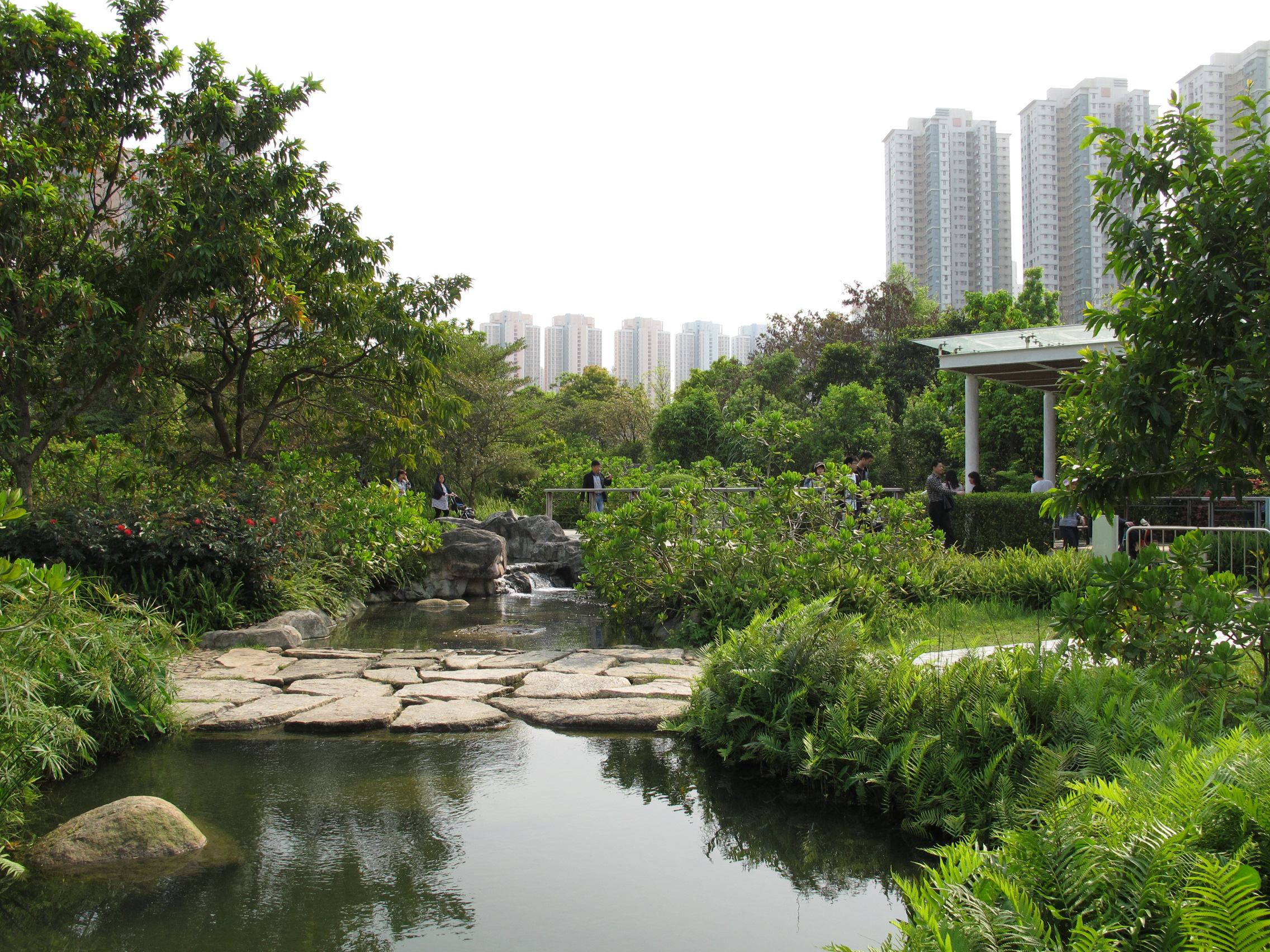
Stream Walk

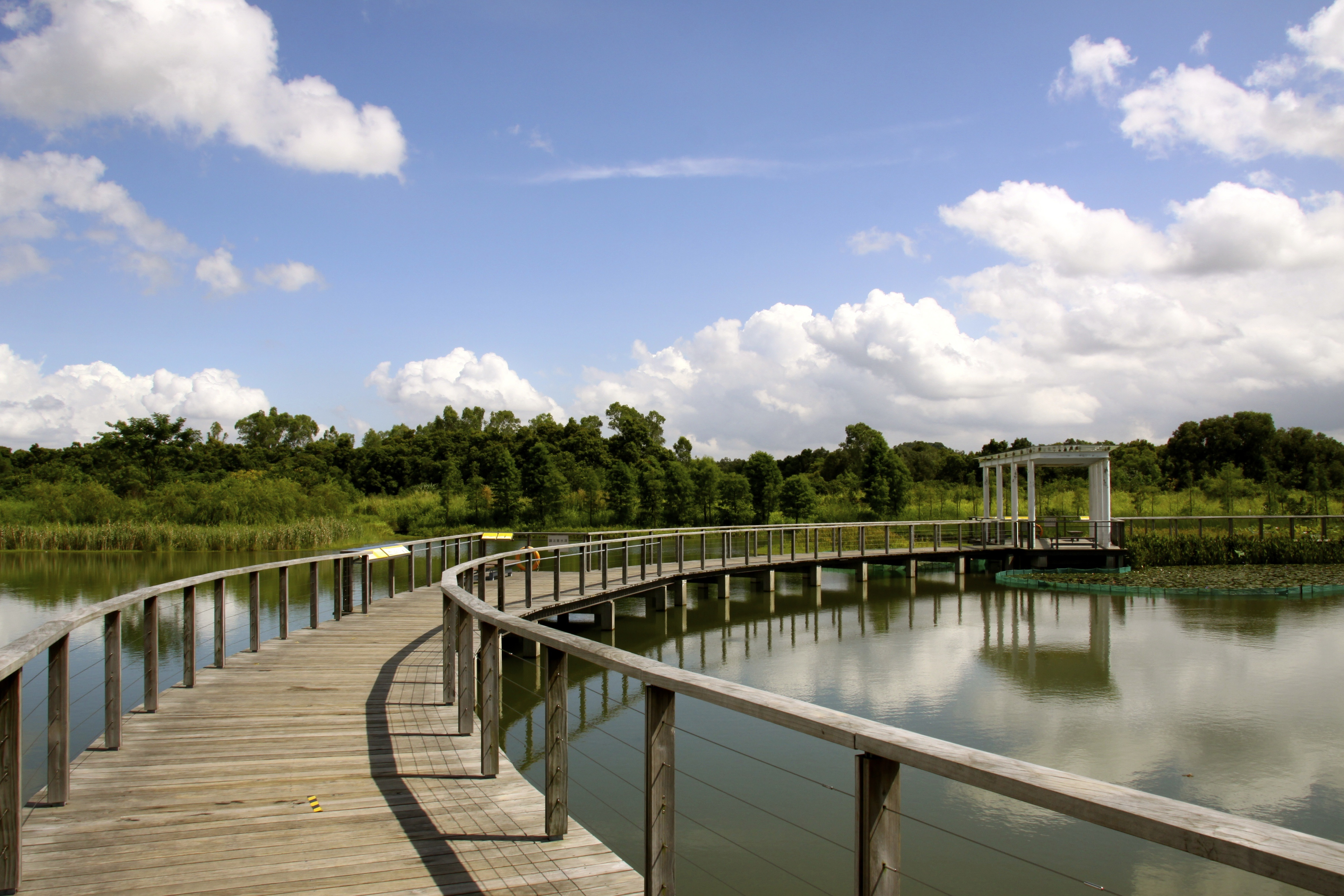
Succession Walk

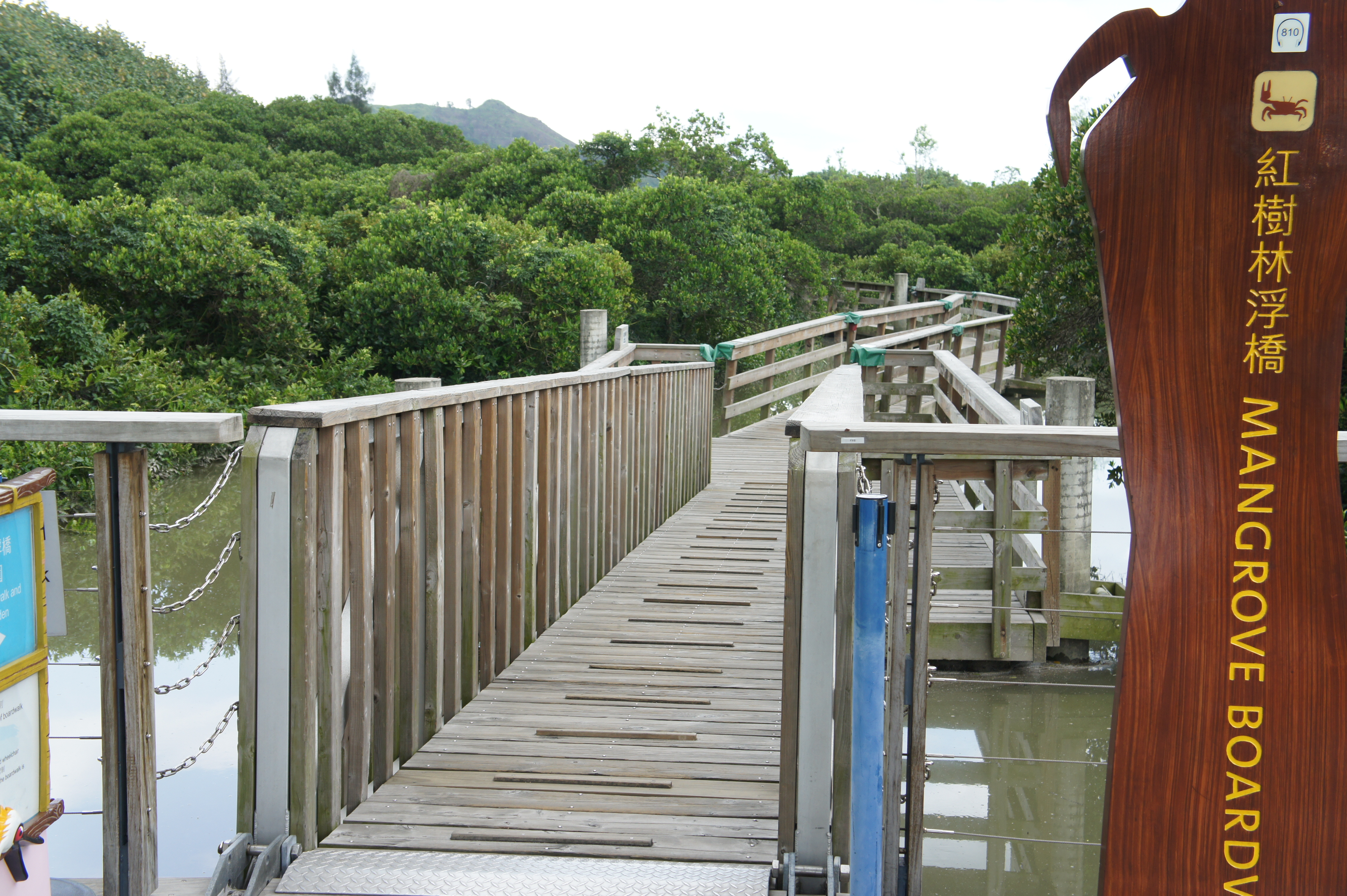
Mangrove Boardwalk

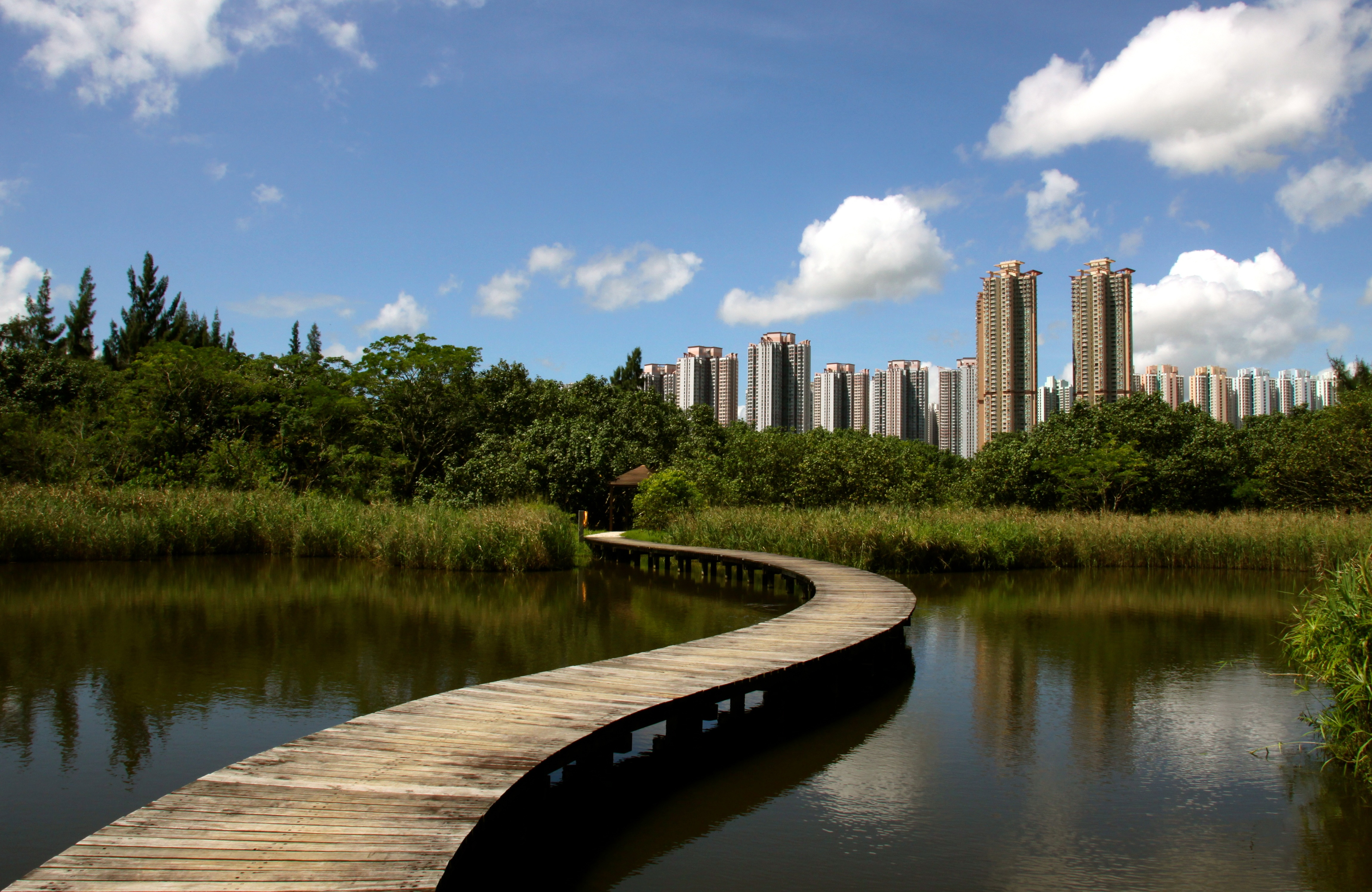
Wildside Walk

== Pui Pui Home ==
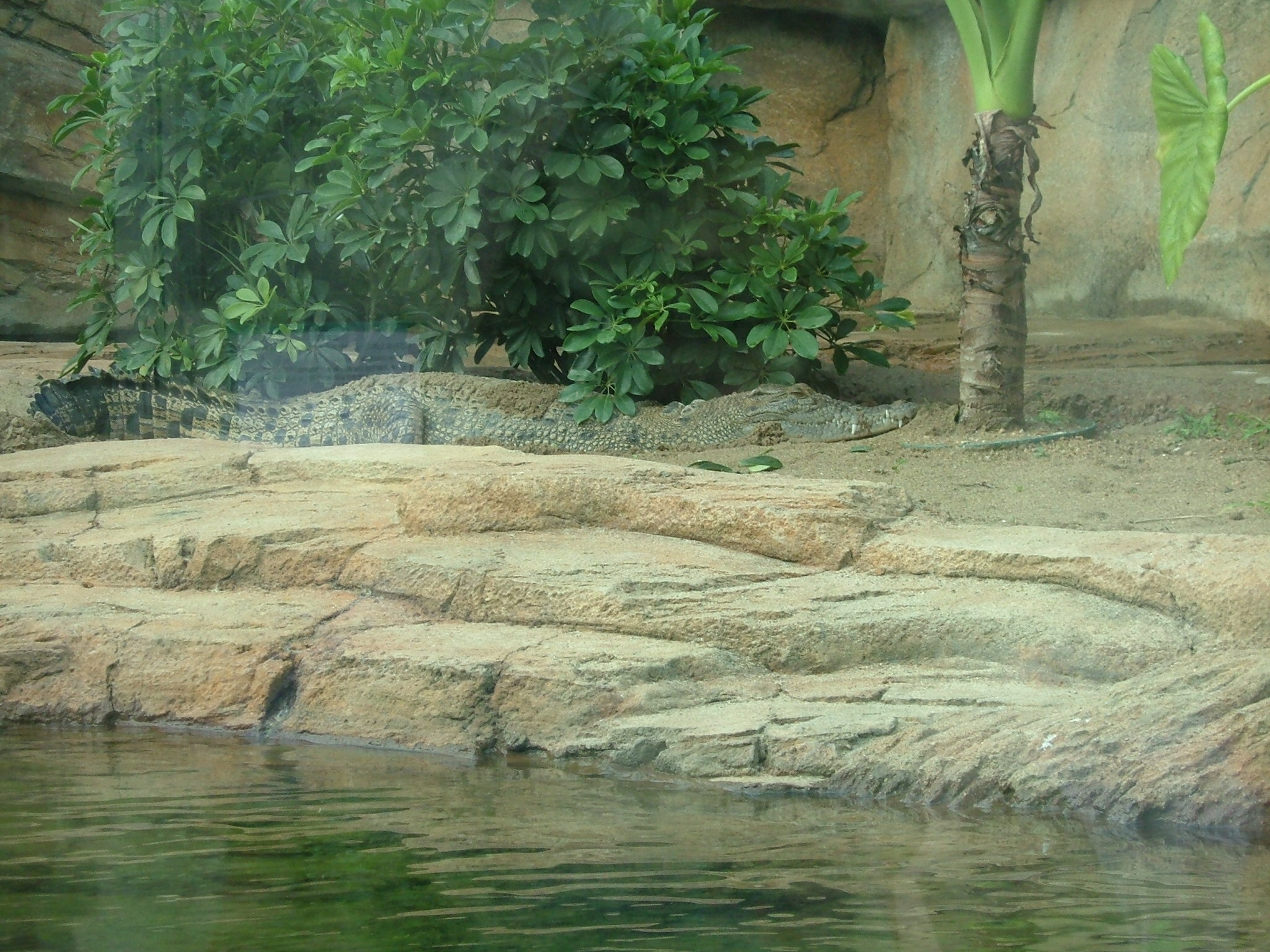
Pui Pui at Hong Kong Wetland Park

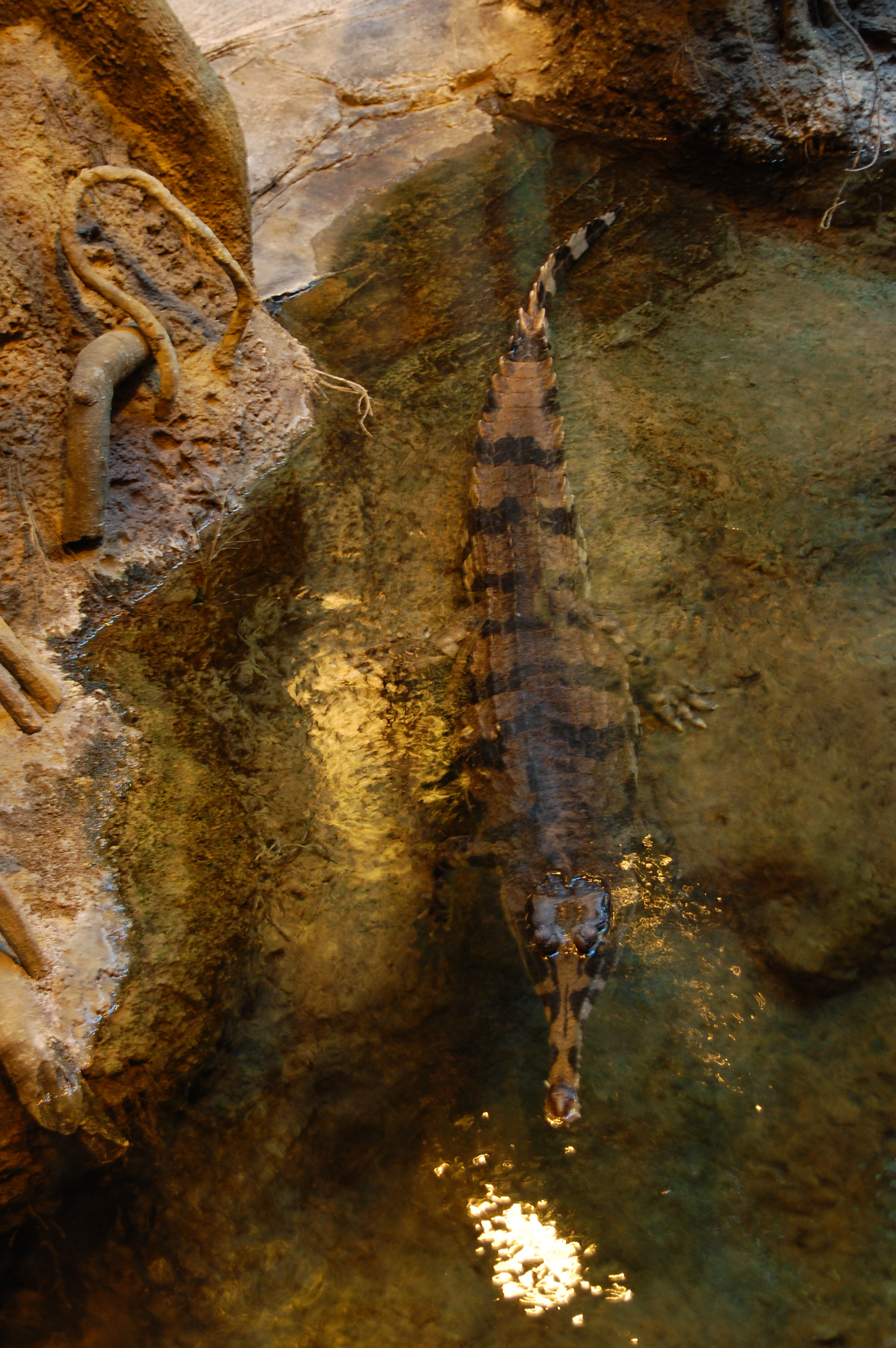
False gharial in Wetland

Pui Pui is a crocodile's name, which is a Chinese pun indicating that it came from Shan Pui River and is the apple of the public's eye.

On 29 August 2006, she was moved into her landscaped enclosure and can be easily viewed by the public. Pui Pui's Home was designed to provide the reptile with a healthy and comfortable living environment.

The outdoor enclosure is 8 by 9 metres (26 by 30 ft), of which 70% is pool area. With a maximum depth of 1-metre (3 ft 3 in), the pool is landscaped with plants to provide sheltered areas, hiding places and basking areas for the reptile. Outdoor facilities include some infra-red heaters, a heat pad and a weighing scale. Water in the pool is continuously circulated through a filtration system.

== Transportation ==
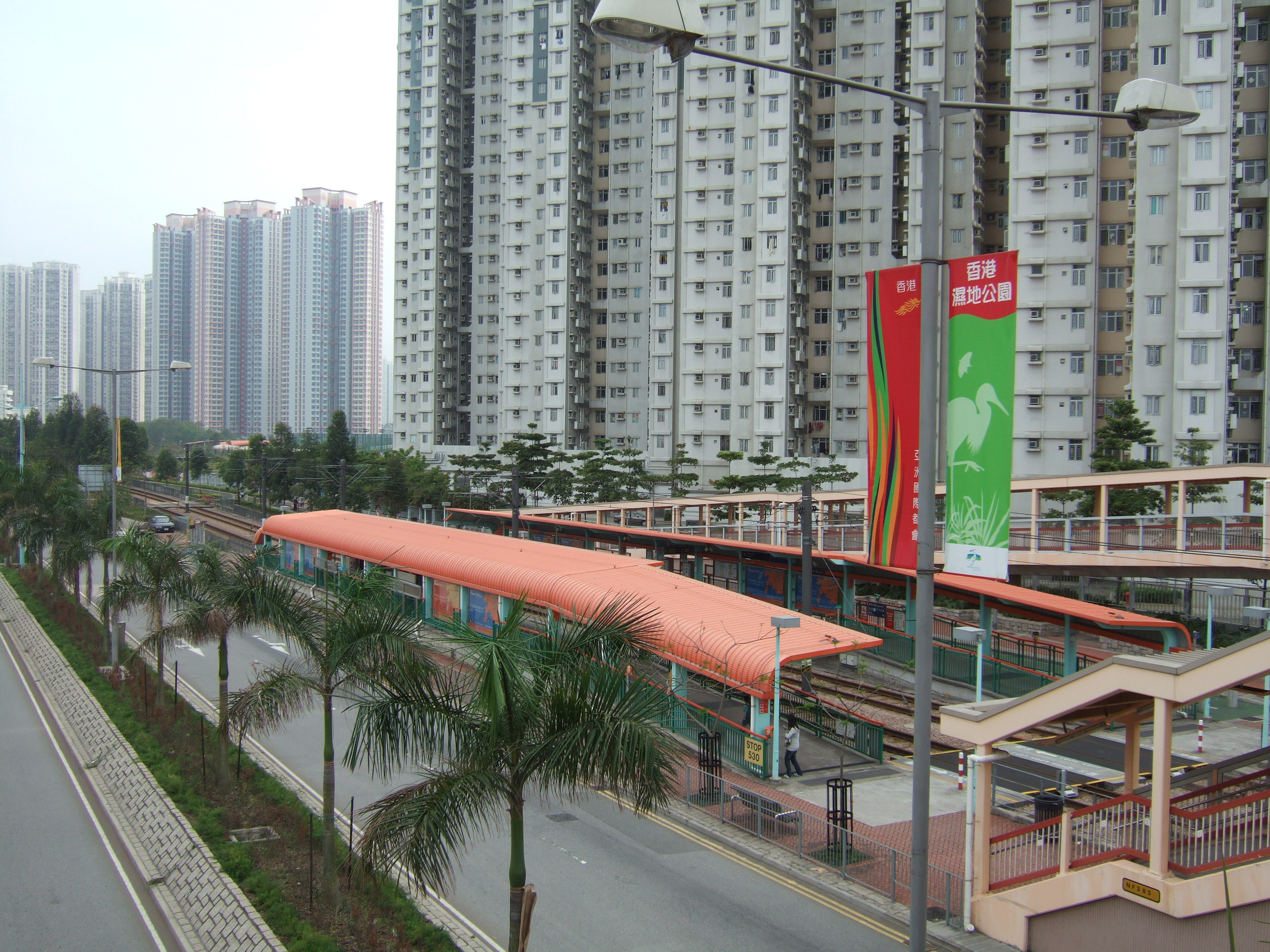
Light rail station

Wetland Park is served by the MTR Light Rail, and the Wetland Park stop and Tin Sau stop belong to Zone 5A for single-ride ticket.

=== Routes ===
- 705: Tin Shui Wai Circular (Counter-Clockwise)
- 706: Tin Shui Wai Circular (Clockwise)
- 761P: Yuen Long to Tin Wing (Limited special service: departing from each terminal every 30 minutes 1000–1500 daily. Normal service terminates at Tin Yat instead of Tin Wing.)

== Climate ==
Wetland Park currently holds the highest recorded temperature in Hong Kong, at 39.8 °C (103.6 °F) on 9 August 2026.

Climate data for Wetland Park (2005–present)
Month	Jan	Feb	Mar	Apr	May	Jun	Jul	Aug	Sep	Oct	Nov	Dec	Year
Record high °C (°F)	28.5 (83.3)	30.2 (86.4)	32.7 (90.9)	35.9 (96.6)	35.7 (96.3)	35.4 (95.7)	37.9 (100.2)	39.8 (103.6)	36.3 (97.3)	36.0 (96.8)	32.3 (90.1)	29.9 (85.8)	39.8 (103.6)
Mean daily maximum °C (°F)	20.3 (68.5)	21.6 (70.9)	24.1 (75.4)	26.9 (80.4)	30.1 (86.2)	31.7 (89.1)	32.8 (91.0)	32.6 (90.7)	32.3 (90.1)	29.8 (85.6)	26.1 (79.0)	21.6 (70.9)	27.5 (81.5)
Daily mean °C (°F)	15.8 (60.4)	17.3 (63.1)	20.0 (68.0)	23.1 (73.6)	26.4 (79.5)	28.3 (82.9)	29.0 (84.2)	28.6 (83.5)	27.9 (82.2)	25.3 (77.5)	21.7 (71.1)	17.0 (62.6)	23.4 (74.1)
Mean daily minimum °C (°F)	12.5 (54.5)	14.1 (57.4)	17.0 (62.6)	20.1 (68.2)	23.7 (74.7)	25.8 (78.4)	26.2 (79.2)	25.7 (78.3)	24.9 (76.8)	22.3 (72.1)	18.6 (65.5)	13.6 (56.5)	20.4 (68.7)
Record low °C (°F)	2.2 (36.0)	4.5 (40.1)	6.7 (44.1)	11.5 (52.7)	16.3 (61.3)	19.9 (67.8)	23.0 (73.4)	22.9 (73.2)	19.8 (67.6)	14.2 (57.6)	8.1 (46.6)	3.1 (37.6)	2.2 (36.0)
Average precipitation mm (inches)	31.5 (1.24)	39.2 (1.54)	67.0 (2.64)	117.4 (4.62)	233.7 (9.20)	289.9 (11.41)	239.3 (9.42)	308.5 (12.15)	185.1 (7.29)	80.1 (3.15)	42.3 (1.67)	22.1 (0.87)	1,656.1 (65.2)
Average relative humidity (%)	72	77	78	80	82	83	82	84	80	74	74	69	78
Average dew point °C (°F)	10.3 (50.5)	12.7 (54.9)	15.8 (60.4)	19.1 (66.4)	22.8 (73.0)	25.1 (77.2)	25.4 (77.7)	25.3 (77.5)	24.0 (75.2)	20.0 (68.0)	16.5 (61.7)	10.6 (51.1)	19.0 (66.1)
Source: Hong Kong Observatory

== See also ==
- Nam Sang Wai
- Fung Lok Wai
- List of buildings and structures in Hong Kong
- Hong Kong Country Parks & Special Areas
