= Yuen Long Industrial Estate =

Industrial estate in Hong Kong

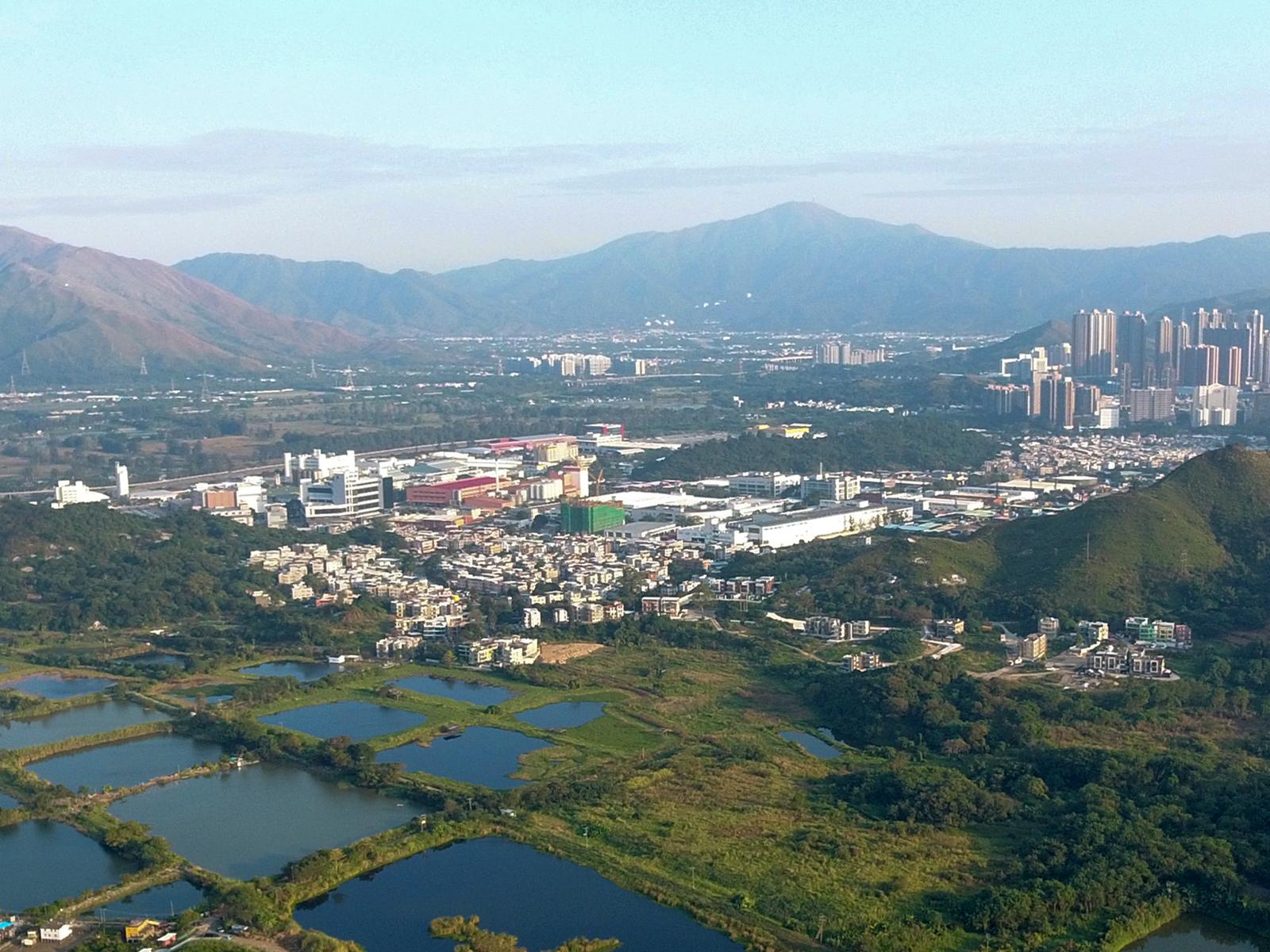
- Yuen Long Industrial Estate
- Traditional Chinese: 元朗工業邨
- Simplified Chinese: 元朗工业邨
Transcriptions
Standard Mandarin
- Hanyu Pinyin: Yuán Lǎng Gōngyè Cūn
Yue: Cantonese
- Jyutping: jyun4 long5 gung1 jip6 cyun1

Alternative Chinese name
- Traditional Chinese: 元朗工業園
- Simplified Chinese: 元朗工业园
Transcriptions
Standard Mandarin
- Hanyu Pinyin: Yuán Lǎng Gōngyè Yuán
Yue: Cantonese
- Jyutping: jyun4 long5 gung1 jip6 jyun4

Yuen Long Industrial Estate (Chinese: 元朗工業邨, branded as 元朗工業園) is an industrial estate in Yuen Long District, New Territories, Hong Kong. It is at the north of Yuen Long Town and opposite to Nam Sang Wai across Shan Pui River. It is administered by the Hong Kong Science and Technology Parks Corporation.

== See also ==
- Wang Chau (Yuen Long)
- Fung Lok Wai
