= Kam Tin River =

River in Hong Kong

Coordinates: 22°28′12″N 114°01′52″E

- Traditional Chinese: 錦田河
Transcriptions
Yue: Cantonese
- Yale Romanization: gám tìhn hòh
- Jyutping: gam2 tin4 ho4

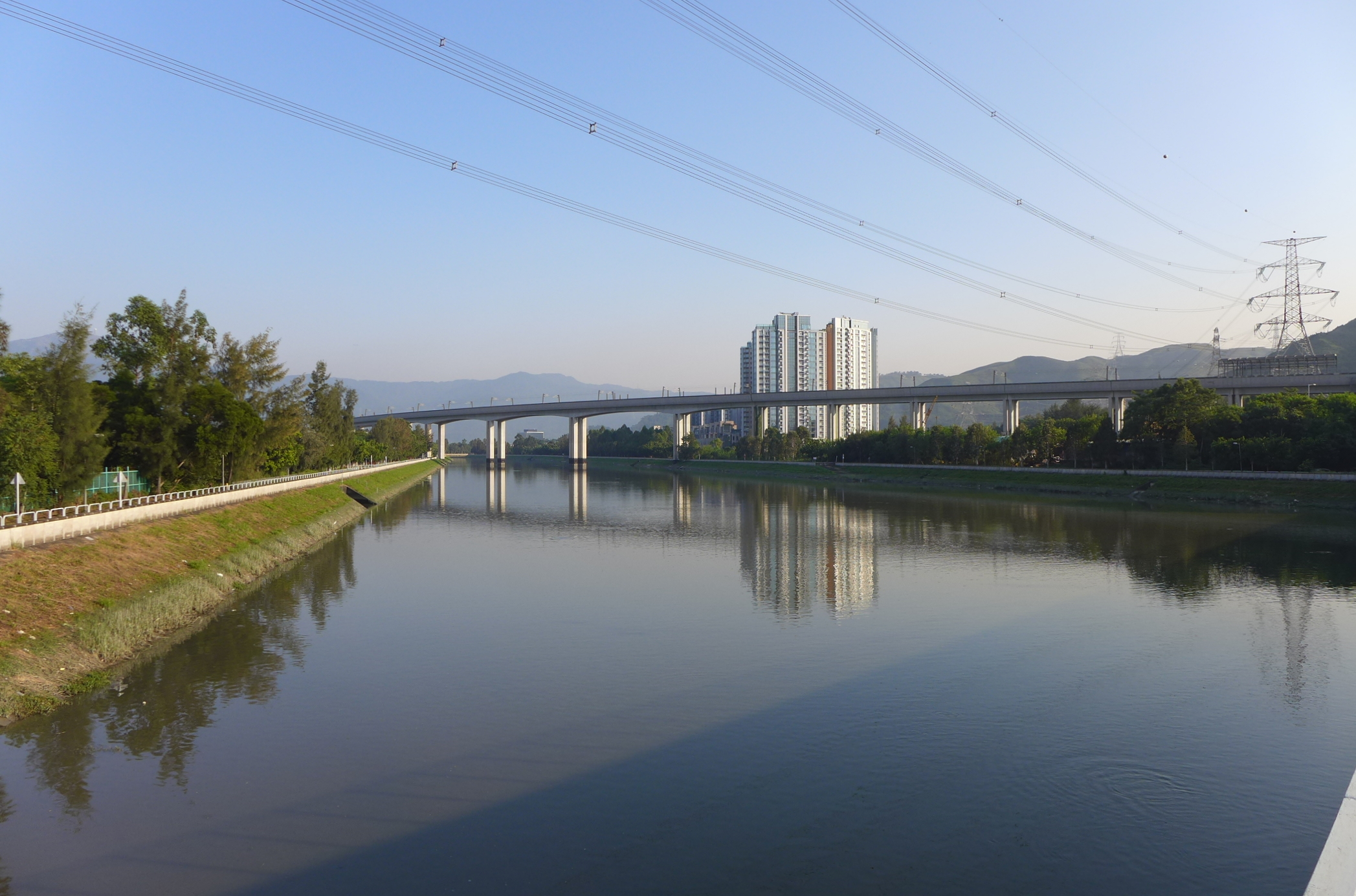
Kam Tin River

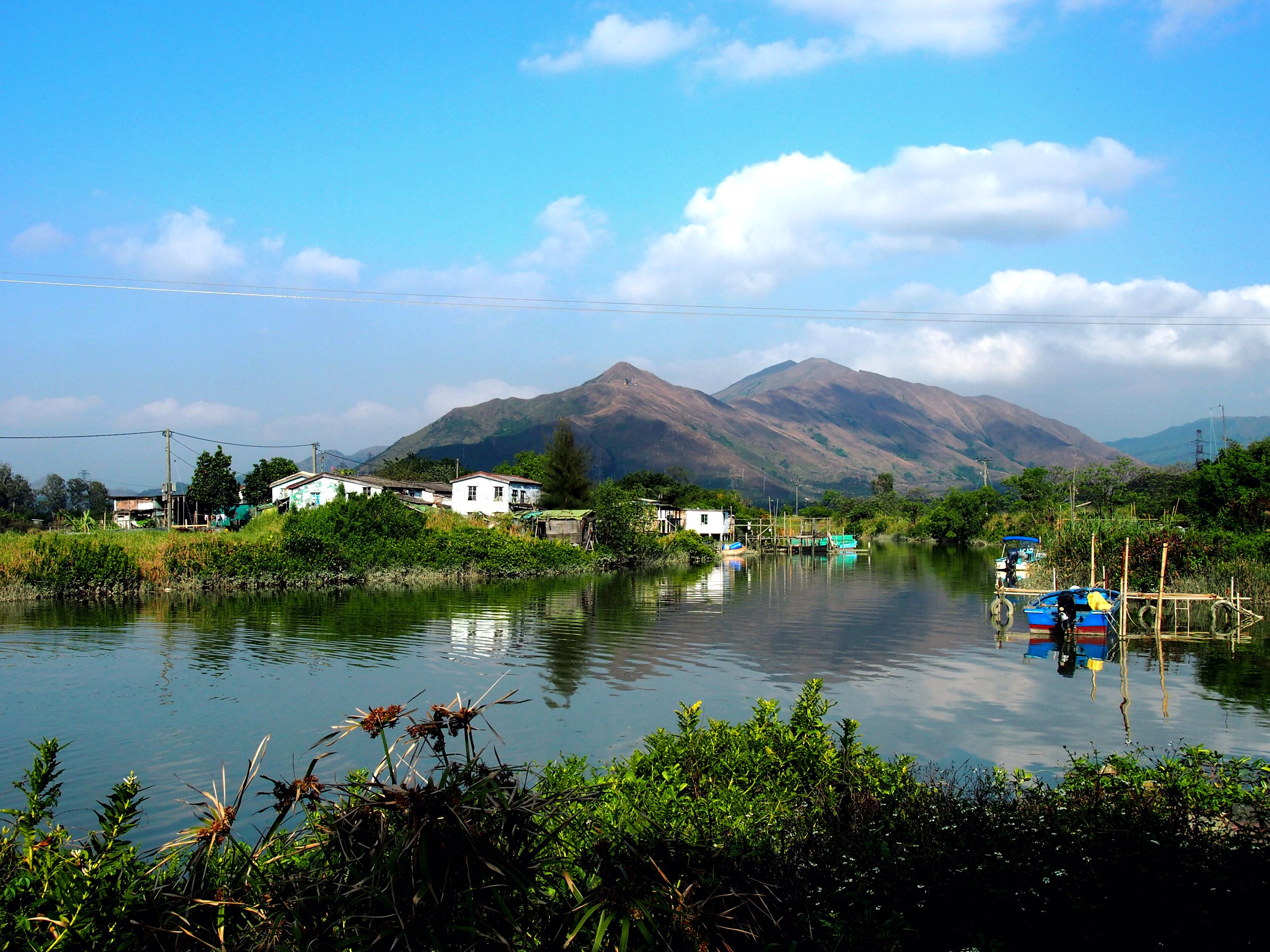
Kam Tin River near Nam Sang Wai

The Kam Tin River (Chinese: 錦田河), located in the northwest New Territories, is a river to the east to Yuen Long, near Kam Tin, Hong Kong. The river basin spans around 44.3 km^{2}. The length of the river is about 13 km. Originating at an altitude of 910 metres near Tai Mo Shan, it has the second highest origin of a Hong Kong river.

Kam Tin River
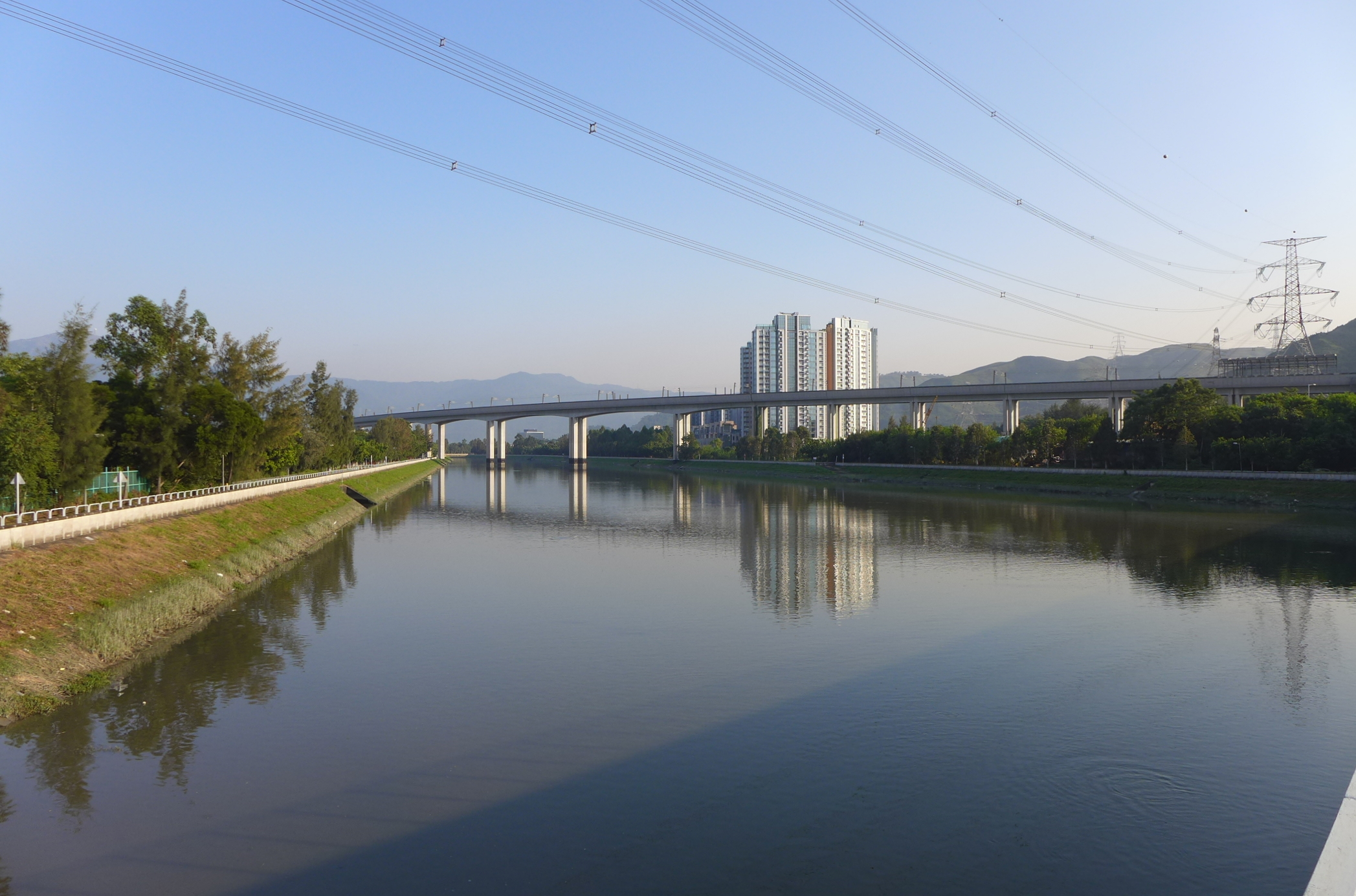

Physical characteristics
- Source
  - location: northern slope of Tai Mo Shan
  - coordinates: 22° 24' 50.4"N, 114° 07' 25.3"E
  - elevation: 910 m
- Mouth
  - location: Shan Pui River
  - coordinates: 22° 27' 13" N, 114° 02' 54" E
  - elevation: 0 m
- Length: 13 km
- Basin size: 44.3 km^2
- Discharge
  - average: 0.506 m^3/s

Basin features
- Tributaries
  - left: Shek Kong stream
  - right: Kap Lung stream

== See also ==
- List of rivers and nullahs in Hong Kong
