= Pui Pui (crocodile) =

Famous crocodile in Hong Kong

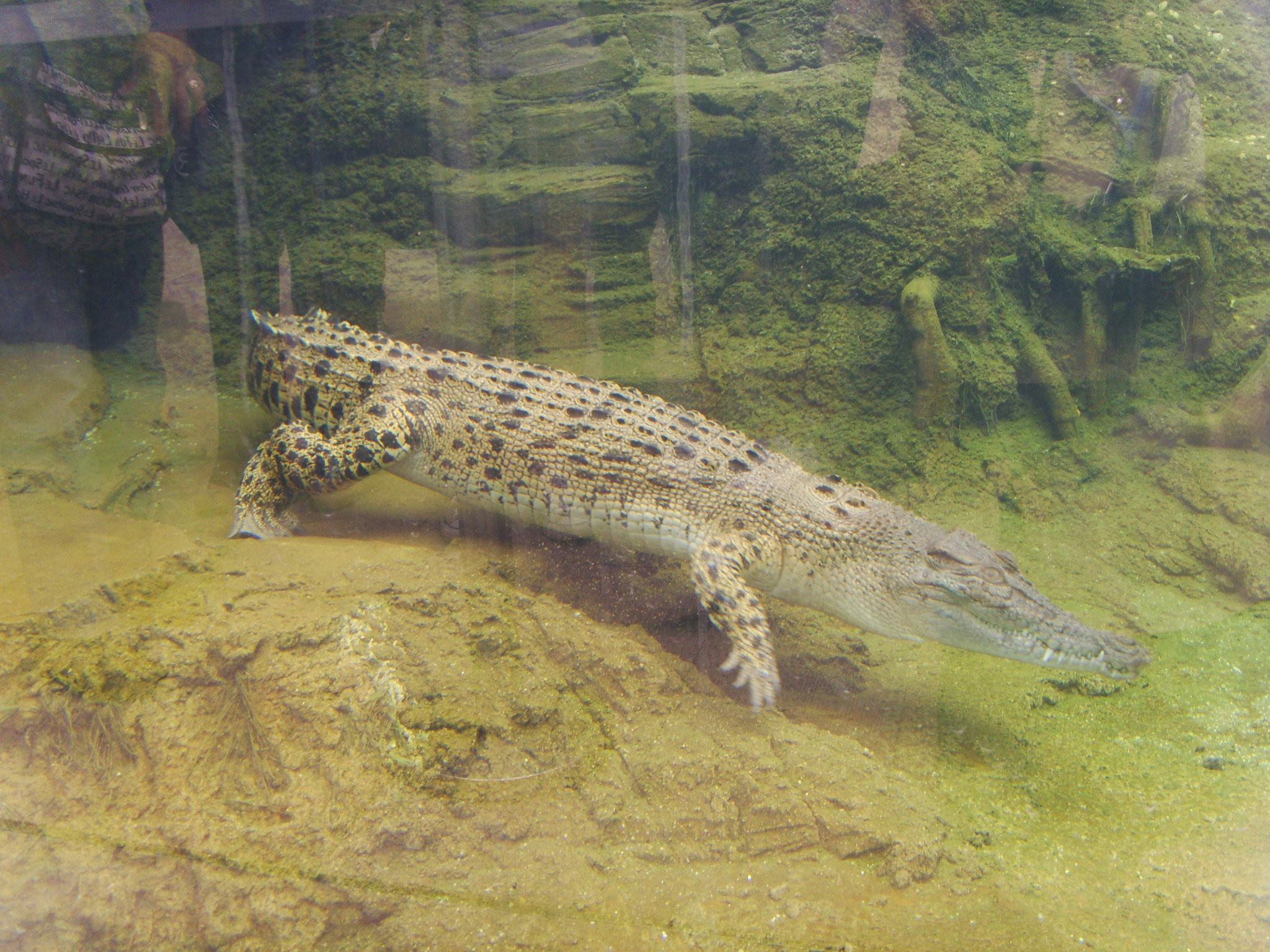
Pui Pui swimming underwater

Pui Pui (Chinese: 貝貝) is a female saltwater crocodile captured in Shan Pui River (山貝河) in Hong Kong on 10 June 2004 by the Agriculture, Fisheries and Conservation Department (AFCD) officers of Hong Kong. She was first transferred to Kadoorie Farm and Botanic Garden before being moved permanently to the Hong Kong Wetland Park on 15 August 2006.

The crocodile has become a local celebrity since being spotted at Shan Pui River, Yuen Long on 2 November 2003. After several weeks of unsuccessful attempts by Australian crocodile hunter John Lever, and months of effort on the part of mainland Chinese experts to capture it, the reptile was trapped by Hong Kong's AFCD staff on 10 June 2004. The crocodile saga aroused wide public interest in wetland and wildlife conservation in Hong Kong.

== Name ==
After a territory-wide naming contest with 1,600 entries, the crocodile was named "Pui Pui" – "the precious one", which is also a reference to Shan Pui River where it was found.

== In captivity ==
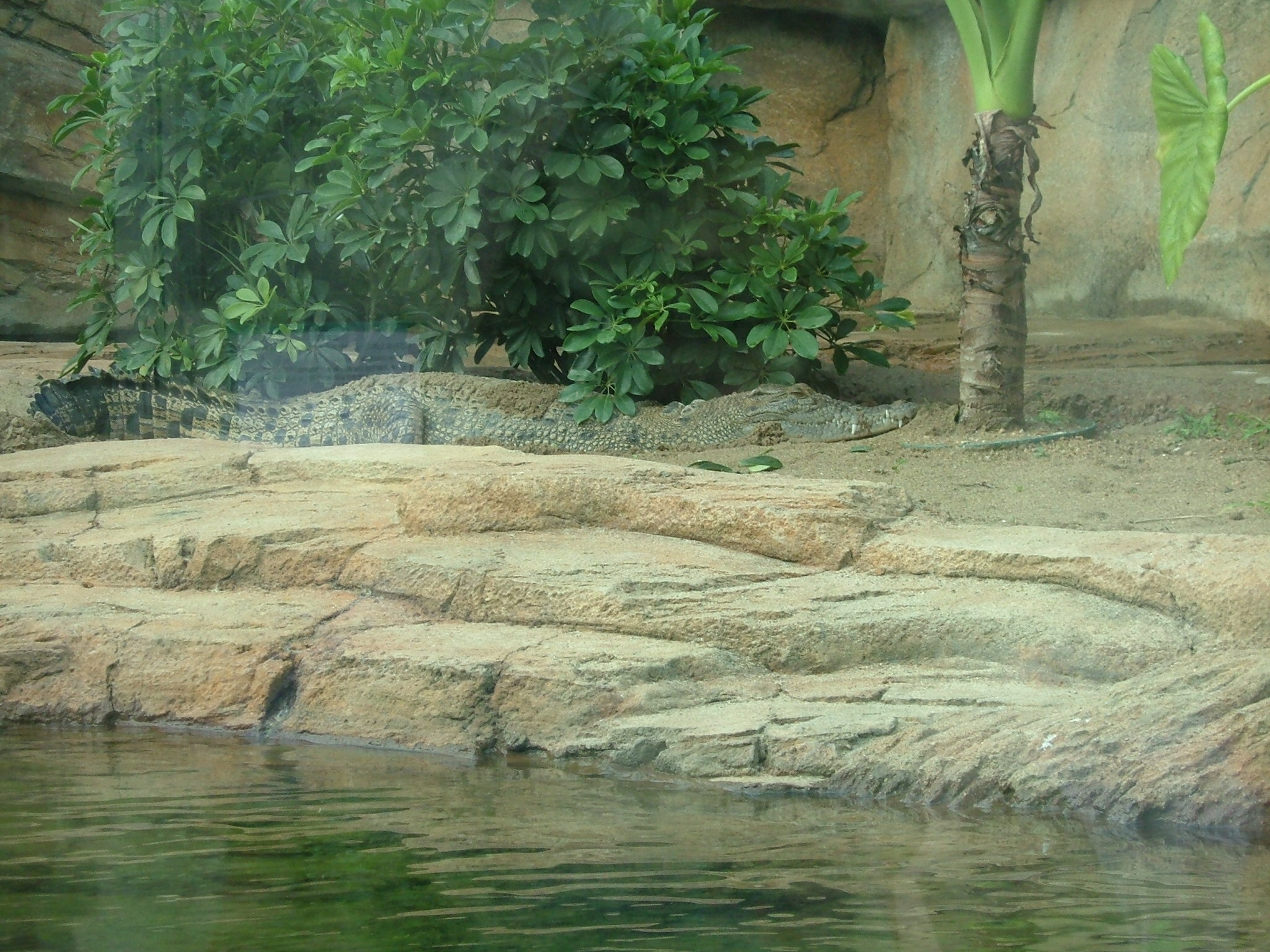
Pui Pui at Hong Kong Wetland Park

She spent two years at Kadoorie Farm while her permanent home at the Hong Kong Wetland Park was being constructed. She moved to her home on 15 August 2006. After two weeks' observation in the indoor portion of her home, she was moved to the external pool where she could be visited by the public.

Speaking after the arrival of the Pui Pui in the Wetland Park, the Hong Kong AFCD Assistant Director Mr Lay Chik-chuen said there was no need for people to rush to the Park to see her, as she was here to stay.

"As a celebrity croc, we believe Pui Pui's exhibition in the Wetland Park will promote public awareness of wetland conservation," he said.

Hong Kong Wetland Park also sells stuffed crocodiles called "Pui Pui" as part of their merchandise.

== Pui Pui's Home ==
On 29 August 2006, she was moved into her landscaped enclosure and can be easily viewed by the public. Pui Pui's Home was designed to provide the reptile with a healthy and comfortable living environment.

The outdoor enclosure is about 8 by 9 metres (26 by 30 ft), of which 70% is pool area. With a maximum depth of one metre, the pool is landscaped with plants to provide sheltered areas, hiding places and basking areas for the reptile. Outdoor facilities include infra-red heaters, a heat pad and a weighing scale. Water in the pool is continuously circulated through a filtration system.

== Age and size ==
Pui Pui was estimated to be about 4 years-old when she was captured in 2004, therefore suggesting that she was born in 2000.

Measuring 1.75 metres (5 ft 9 in) and weighing 19.5 kilograms (43 lb) when she moved to her permanent home in August 2006, Pui Pui will grow to three metres when fully matured. The 72-meter^{2} outdoor enclosure in the Hong Kong Wetland Park is designed to accommodate her as she grows larger.

== Popular culture ==
In October 2004, a bilingual children's book "The Crocodile who wanted to be famous", which is based on the life of Pui Pui, was published by Sixth Finger Press and attracted widespread interest in both the Chinese and English media.
