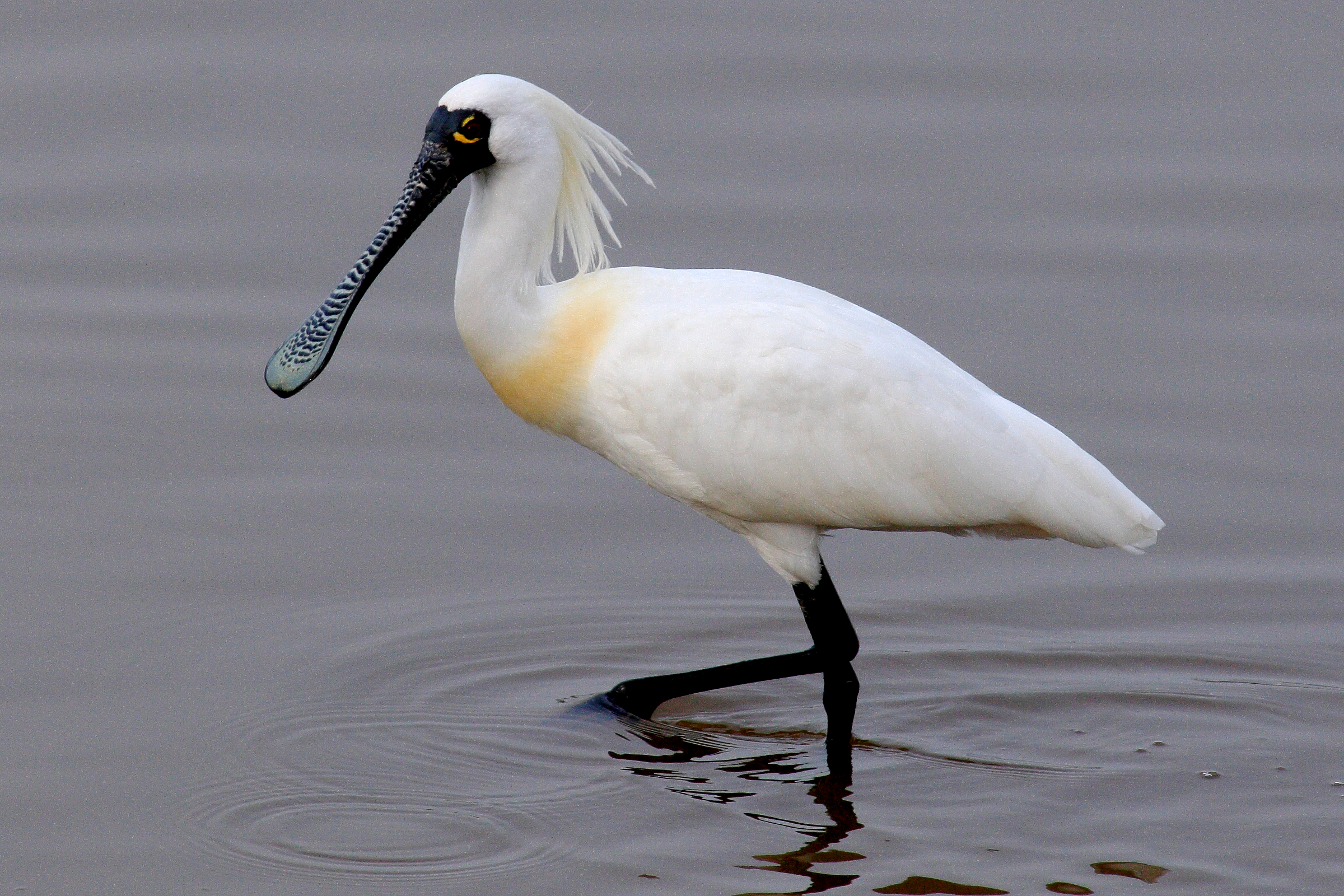
- Summer plumage at Niigata

Conservation status
- Vulnerable (IUCN 3.1)

Scientific classification
- Kingdom: Animalia
- Phylum: Chordata
- Class: Aves
- Order: Pelecaniformes
- Family: Threskiornithidae
- Genus: Platalea
- Species: P. minor

Binomial name
- Platalea minor Temminck & Schlegel, 1850

= Black-faced spoonbill =

Species of bird

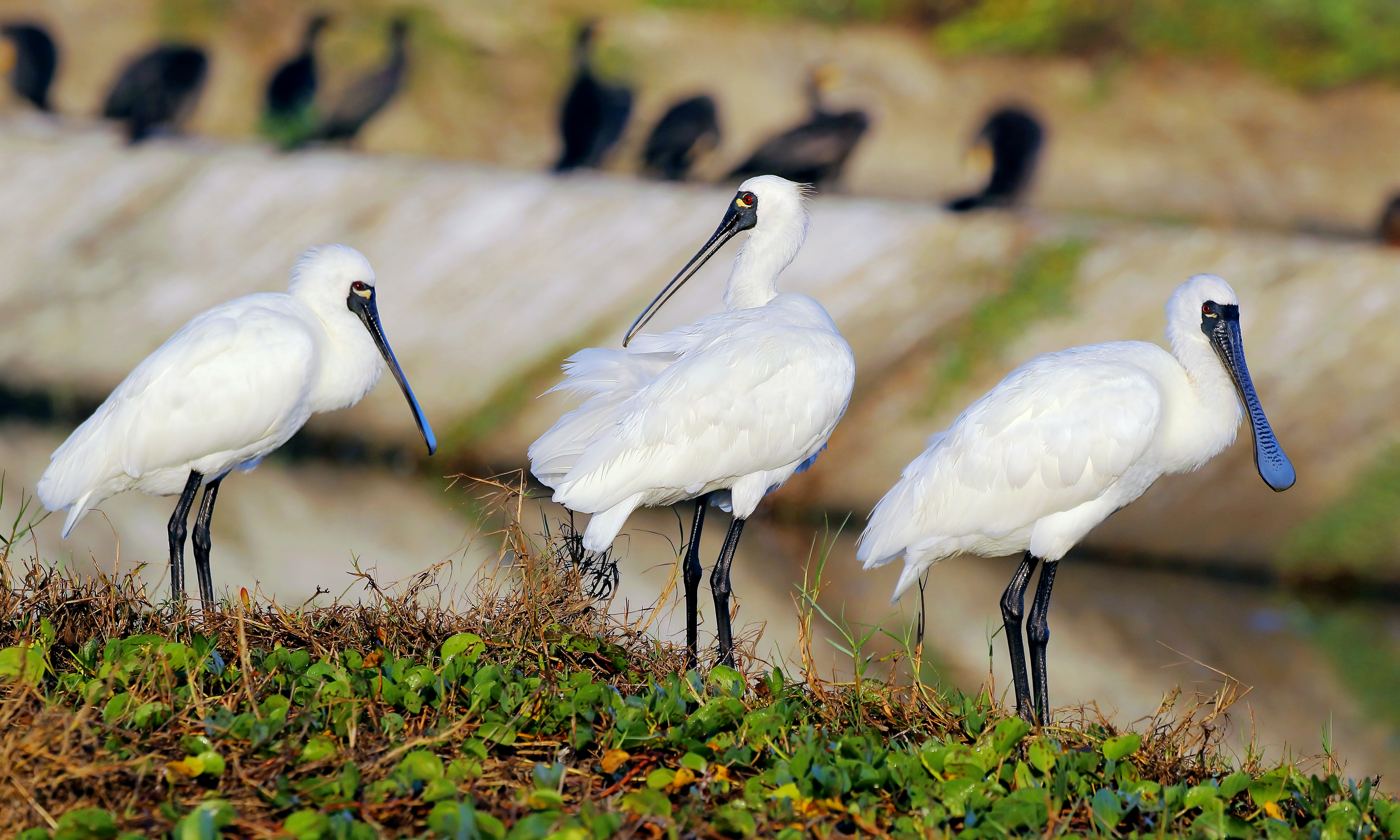
Wintering in Aogu Wetland, Taiwan

The black-faced spoonbill (Platalea minor) is a species of wading bird in the ibis and spoonbill family Threskiornithidae, found in eastern Asia. This species has the most restricted distribution of the six spoonbill species, and is the only one regarded as vulnerable. Spoonbills are large water birds with dorso-ventrally flattened, spatulate bills; they use a tactile method of feeding, wading in the water and sweeping their beaks from side-to-side to detect prey.

Confined to the coastal areas of eastern Asia, it seems that it was once common throughout its area of distribution. It currently breeds mostly on a few small rocky islands off the west coast of North Korea and South Korea, with four wintering sites at Macau, Hong Kong, Taiwan and Vietnam, as well as other places where they have been observed in migration. Wintering also occurs in Jeju, South Korea, Kyushu and Okinawa, Japan, and the Red River delta in Vietnam. More recently, sightings were noted in Thailand, the Philippines, and at additional sites in China.

Black-faced spoonbill was internationally classified as an endangered species by the IUCN in 2000. Nearly driven to global extinction in the 1980s, conservation efforts amongst various Asian countries in recent years has helped in bringing its population back onto a steadily increasing trend.

The population in the 2012 census was recorded at 2,693 birds, with an estimation of 1,600 mature birds. Breeding colonies occur between March and August, on small islands.

In the 2022 global census, the population was recorded at 6,162 individuals.

Black-faced spoonbill is a crepuscular feeder, dependent on intertidal mudflats. Conservation efforts on protecting breeding sites and wintering sites have been made since, and surveys were taken in order to determine the opinions and awareness of the local residents, residing close to their natural habitats. One survey taken by Jin et al. 2008, inquired upon the 'Willingness-To-Pay" factor in the locals, as well as understanding effects on mandatory surcharges compared to voluntary payments.

== Taxonomy ==
A study of mitochondrial DNA of the spoonbills found that black-faced and royal spoonbills were each other's closest relatives. Out of the six species of Platalea, black-faced spoonbill is the rarest.

== Breeding ==
Black-faced spoonbill reached a serious low in population in the 1990s, but by 2003 their numbers had increased to at least 1,069 counted individuals. While it is known that their breeding area covers northeastern China and several islands between North and South Korea, human-assisted breeding efforts have not been overly successful due to the difficulty in sexing black-faced spoonbills, though using polymerase chain reaction techniques on DNA samples has allowed researchers to sex adult specimens correctly.

After migrating to their wintering locations, black-faced spoonbills return with yellow breeding plumage, which extends from the back of their heads to their breasts. While this plumage only develops during the third or fourth year of life when black-billed spoonbills are sexually mature, only about half of black-faced spoonbills with this plumage breed each breeding season, which contributes to the very slow pace at which the population numbers are increasing.

== Distribution ==
The global population of this species is likely based on the winter population count which was carried out in 1988–1990 in all known sites. This count estimated about only 288 individuals.

As of 2006, following sustained conservation efforts, the estimated global population had increased to 1,679; the 2008 census resulted in an estimated total count of 2,065 individuals; and a 2010 census reported 2,346.

The known localised population of North Korea is not known to exceed 30 birds. However, there is believed to be another, so far undiscovered colony which provides regional population stability and it is assumed to be probably located in north-east China; for example, on the islands of Liaoning (near the Korean nesting zone).

As black-faced spoonbills are migratory, their conservation is based on the protection of their breeding, "stop-over" and wintering grounds, making conservation efforts complex. However, spoonbills are able to adapt to disturbance on a large scale. The exact distribution of the species remains unclear, although some attempts at modelling population developments under climate change impacts have been made.

== Threats ==
It is thought that the principal cause of the decline of this species is the destruction of its habitat, more particularly the drainage of intertidal mudholes for agriculture, and more recently aquaculture and industrial development. The Korean War (1950–1953) must also have had a negative impact on the species, because the birds ceased nesting in South Korea for decades, with breeding only resuming there within recent years. In Japan, where it was once common for them to winter, they became extremely rare at this same time, and in later years there has never been a winter in which more than 5 birds were observed.

With the construction of a Shinkansen bridge in the Yatsushiro Sea between 2004 and 2009 next to a very important migration site for black-faced spoonbills, many feared that it would cause their numbers to decrease. Thankfully, because of carefully planned out measures implemented in order to counter act the construction of the bridge, the population actually managed to increase during the time of construction.

Human disturbance can also be much more direct. Many humans disturb mating patterns unknowingly by taking photographs of birds during their mating time, leading to a decrease in offspring. According to research done in the Xing-Ren Tuo region of China in 1999, shellfish collectors, photographers, powerboats, and gull egg collectors are the major sources of disturbance causing black-faced spoonbills to desert their nests.

Offshore wind farms have been implicated in disrupting spoonbill migrations from Korea to China or Hong Kong over the Yellow Sea, leading to failure to reach wintering sites or even mortalities through exhaustion.

== Conservation ==
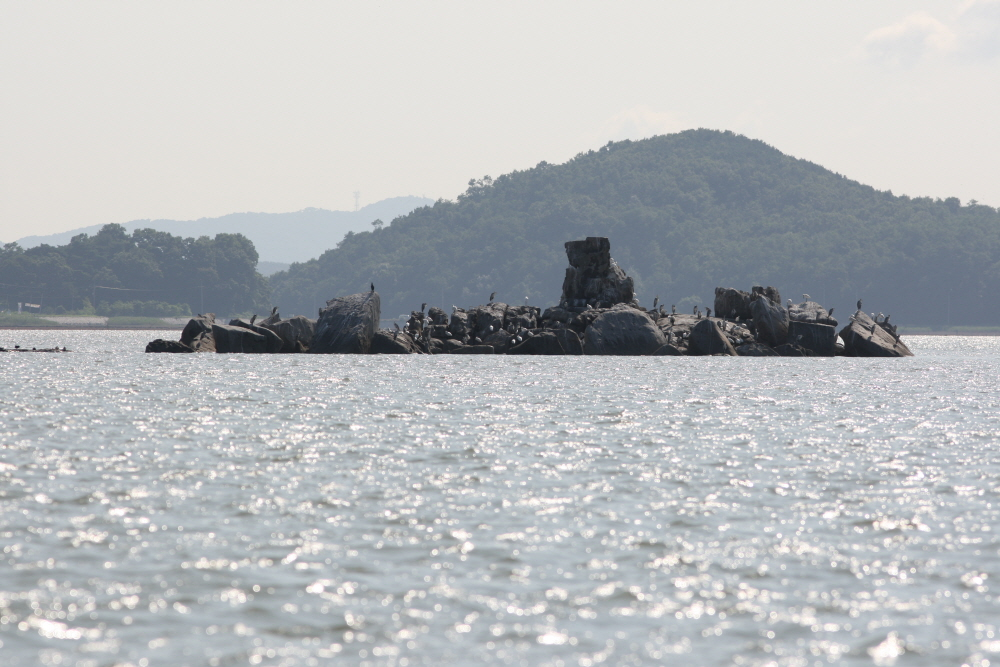
Protected breeding site in Ganghwa Island tidal flat, South Korea

The bird is a protected species in China as part of the China Red Data Book; its stopover site at Jiuduansha off Shanghai is a national nature preserve. In Hong Kong, it is a protected species under Wild Animals Protection Ordinance Cap 200. A quarter of the world's population of black-faced spoonbill can be found in Mai Po Marshes during their migration.

The species is reasonably well protected in North Korea, where their nesting islands off the coast were declared a Zone of Protection with restricted access, thus there is some degree of stability in the breeding areas. There remain nevertheless several threats, mainly in the wintering zones. The need for land to assign to industry is great in the wintering sites in Taiwan, whereas those in Vietnam are being converted for shrimp breeding, though they are within a reserve subject to the Ramsar Convention.

During the winter months, over half of the population migrates to the Chiku Wetland in southwestern Taiwan. The birds are incapable of catching large fish; therefore many of them rely on the largescale mullets to feed off of in the winter months spent in the wetlands. These mullets however have recently become endangered due to the increase of spoonbill population who spend the winter months there (minimum of 191 birds in 1991/1992 up to a minimum of 840 in 2004/2005). Conservation of the largescale mullet is imperative in order to continue to sustain the endangered black-faced spoonbills.

In Hong Kong, disturbance by fishermen and shell gatherers often prevent the birds from feeding at low tide. In addition, with the continued expansion of human populations in the Far East, pollution will probably become an important problem. Disease has the ability to devastate black-face spoonbills as well. In the winter of 2002/2003, 73 died due to avian botulism. It may be necessary to establish additional protective areas or reserves in order not to let the population of birds to succumb to disease.

Black-faced spoonbill is legally recognized as natural monument #205 and a first-class endangered species in South Korea. Breeding colonies exist on Ganghwa Island, as well as on a pair of artificial islands in Namdong Reservoir, located in the city of Incheon.
