= Darko =

Darko is a common Slavic given name, and an Akan family name.

People:

- Darko (given name)
- Darko (surname)

Places:

- Velké Dářko, a pond in the Czech Republic

Movies:

- Donnie Darko, a 2001 film by Richard Kelly starring Jake Gyllenhaal and Jena Malone
- S. Darko, a 2009 film, sequel to Donnie Darko
