= Ng Uk Tsuen, Yuen Long District =

Village of Hong Kong

Coordinates: 22.46468°N 114.02125°E

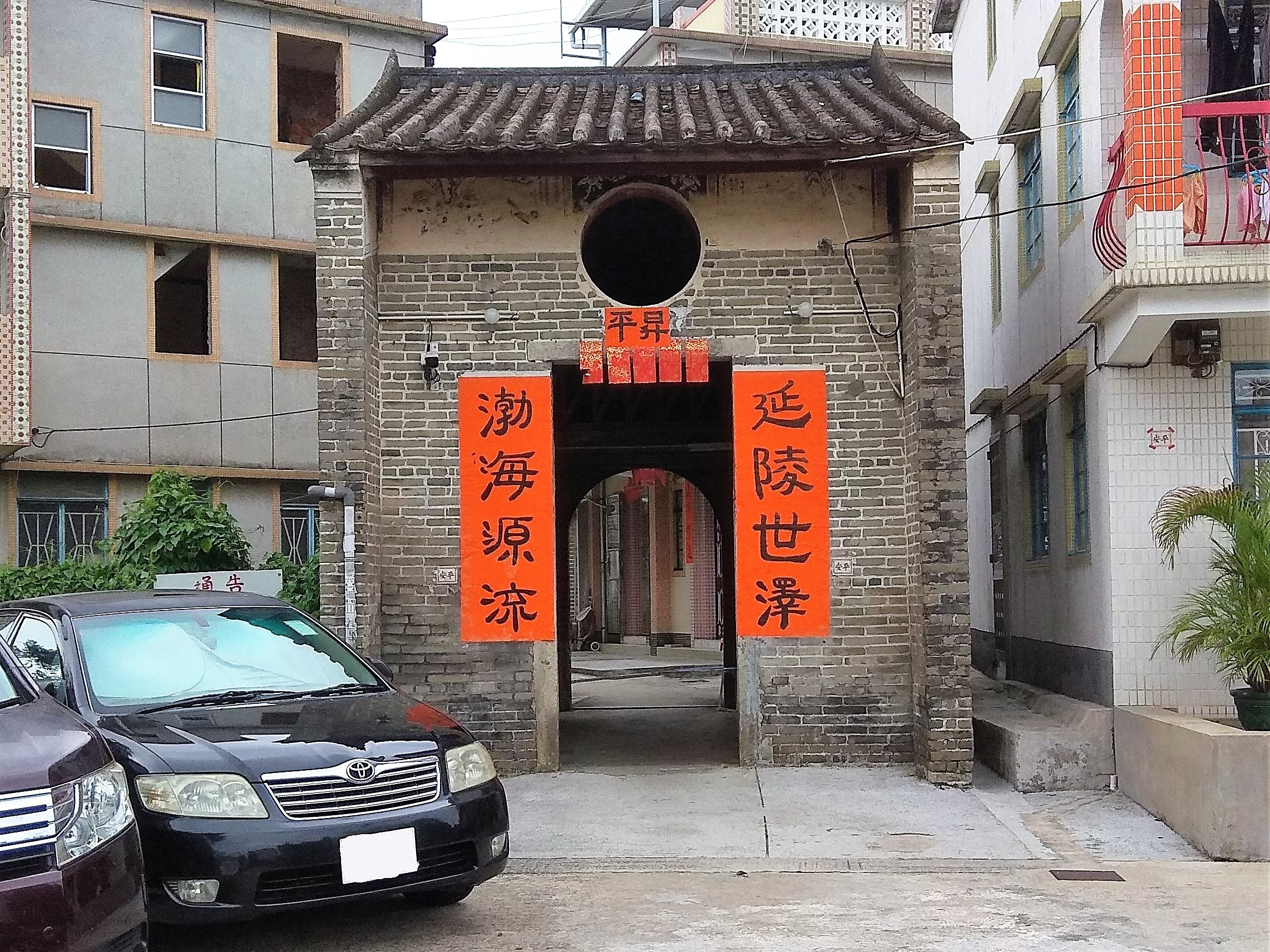
Entrance gate of Ng Uk Tsuen.

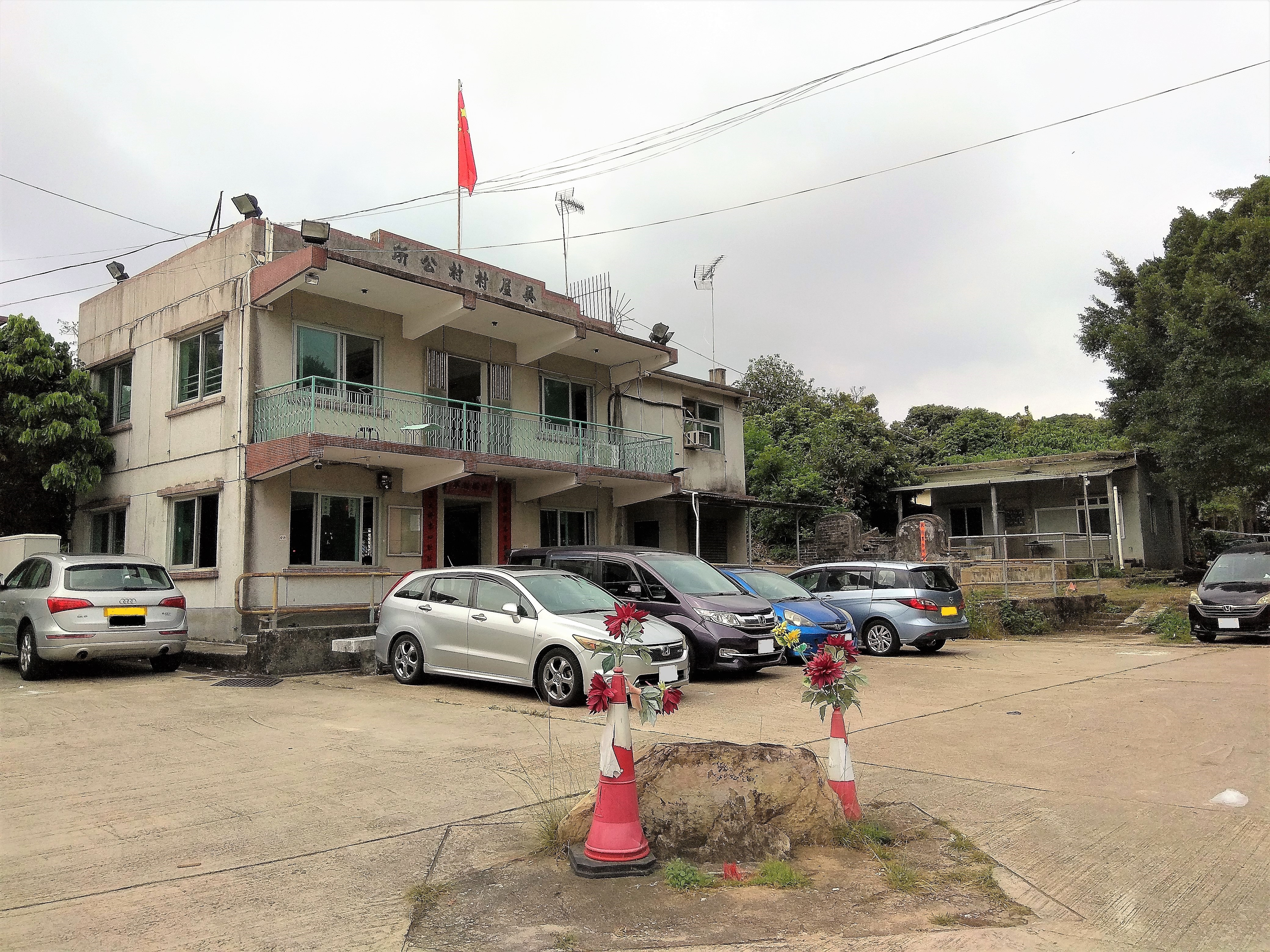
Ng Uk Tsuen Village Office.

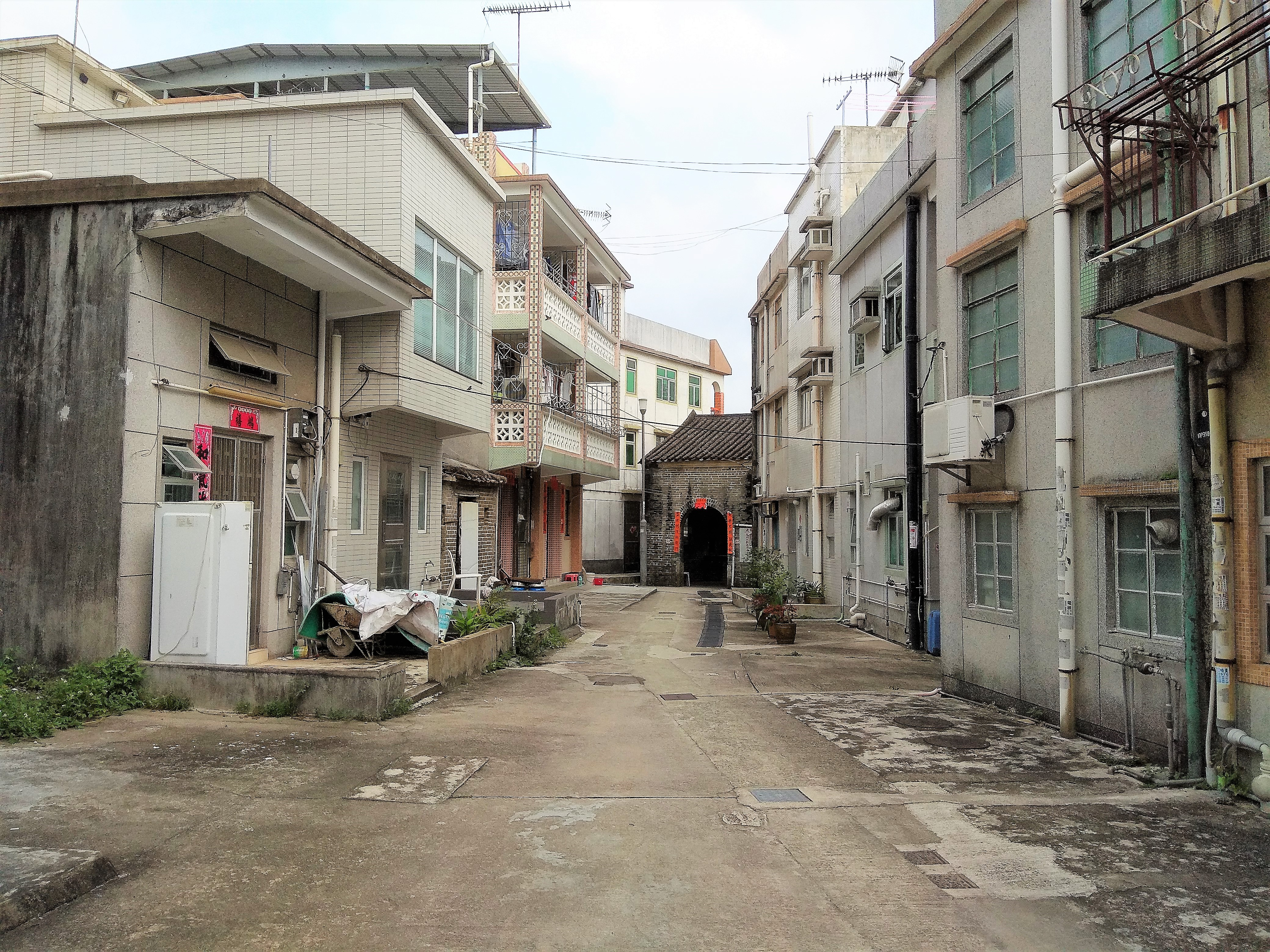
Village lane in Ng Uk Tsuen.

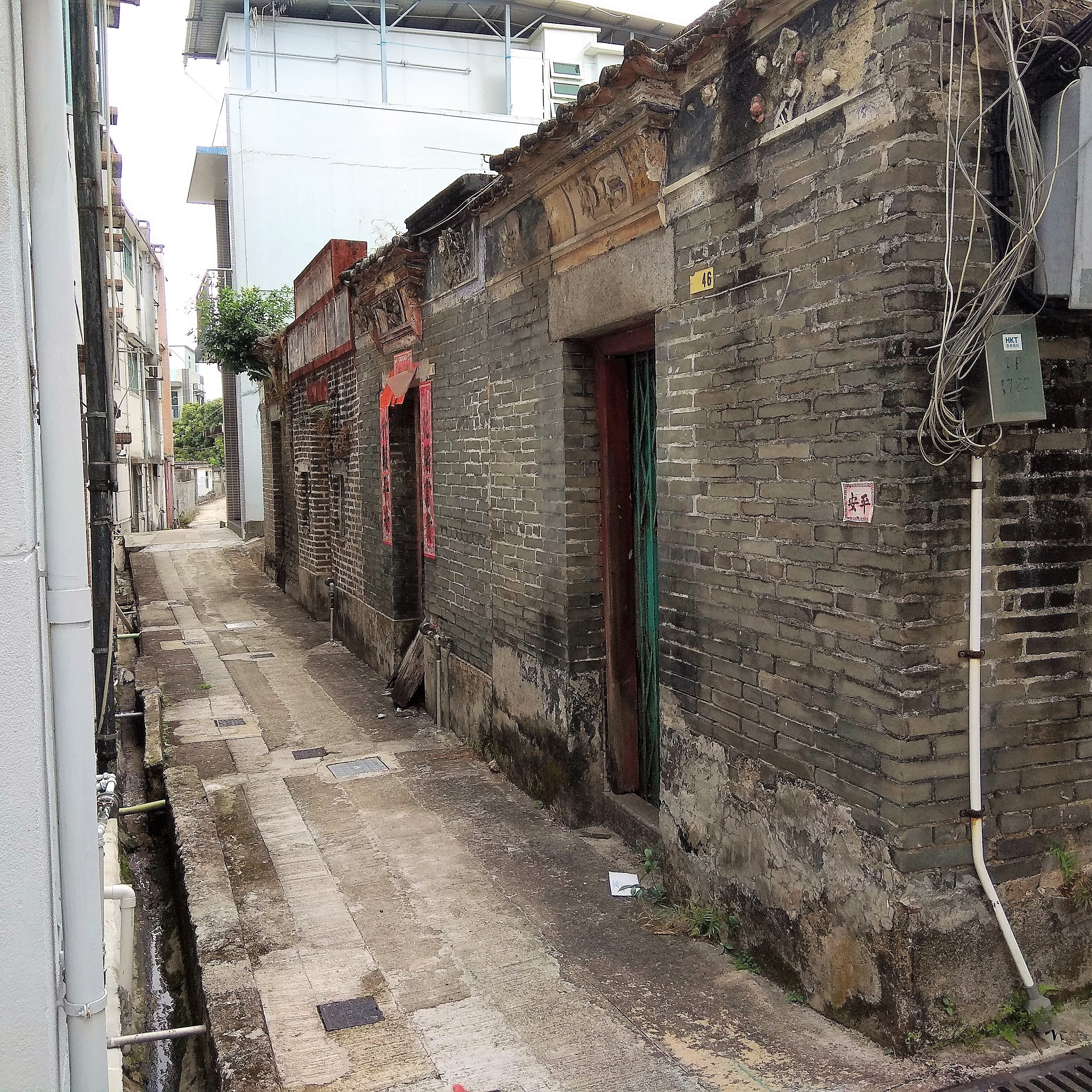
Row of old houses in Ng Uk Tsuen.

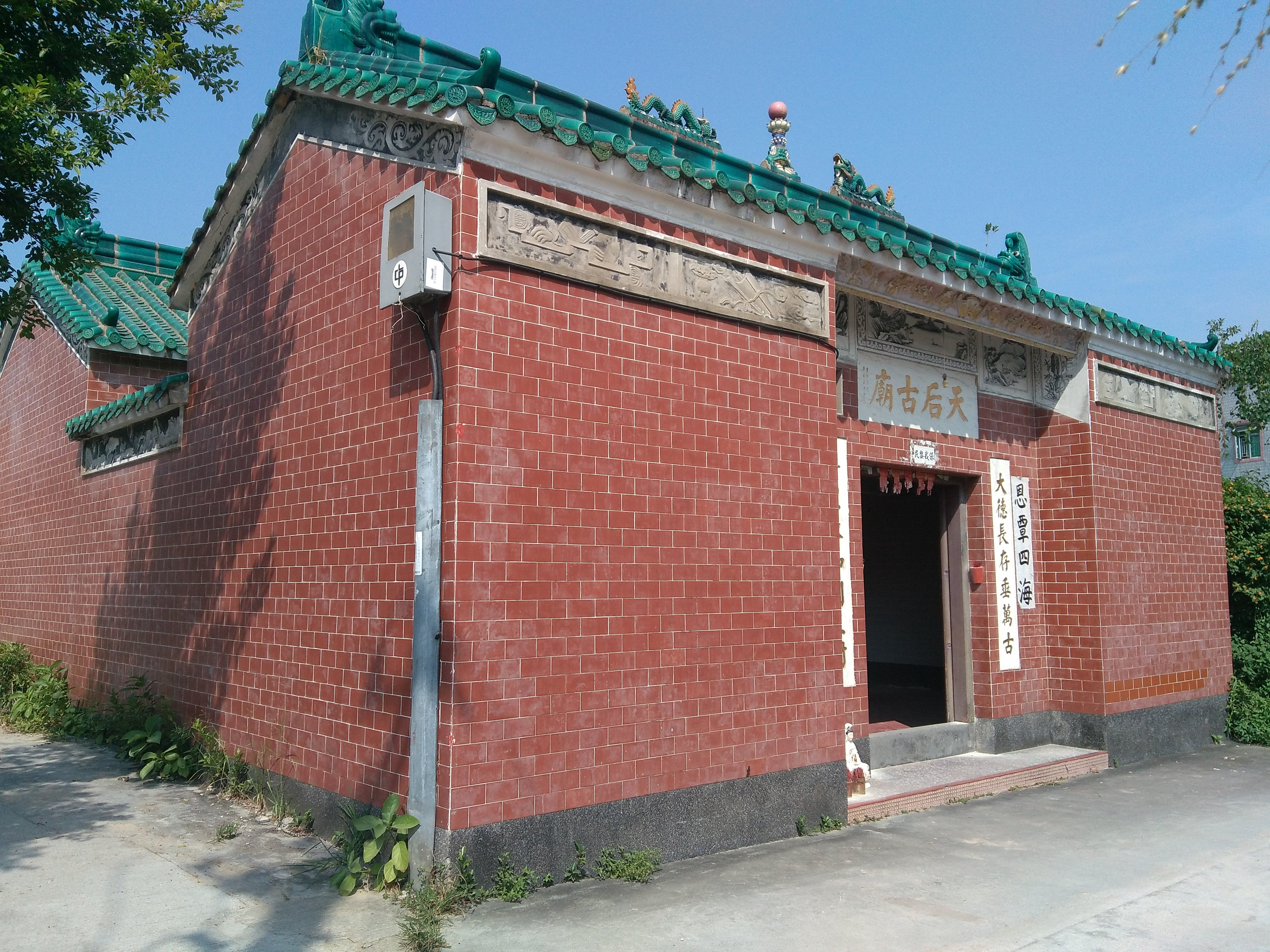
Tin Hau Temple near Ng Uk Tsuen.

Ng Uk Tsuen (Chinese: 吳屋村) or Tai Tseng Ng Uk Tsuen (大井吳屋村) is a village in Wang Chau, Yuen Long District, Hong Kong.

== Location ==
Ng Uk Tsuen is located north of Kai Shan and Yuen Long Industrial Estate, next to the villages of Tai Tseng Wai and Shing Uk Tsuen. The area north of the village, Fung Lok Wai, features fish ponds.

== Administration ==
Ng Uk Tsuen is a recognized village under the New Territories Small House Policy. It is one of the 37 villages represented within the Ping Shan Rural Committee. For electoral purposes, Ng Uk Tsuen is part of the Ping Shan North constituency.

== History ==
Ng Uk Tsuen is a one-clan village founded in 1556 by the ancestor Ng Kei-cheong (吳其昌), who came from Nanyuan (南園) village in Dongguan. The Ng were farmers, cultivating crops and vegetables, which were sold at the Yuen Long Market. They were also fishing and catching crabs in Deep Bay.

When the Great Clearance was lifted in the second half of the 17th century, the villagers returned and rebuilt the village. Because of the disturbance caused by piracy, villages were walled. Ng Uk Tsuen was walled in the mid Kangxi period but the wall was later demolished.

== Features ==
A survey conducted in 2008 identified 37 traditional and historic structures in the village, including houses and shrines, "in various conditions, ranging from completely ruinous to inhabitable."

The entrance gate of the village was built in 1862 for defense purposes. A niche on the ground floor houses the Earth God statue and another honoring Kui Xing is located on the cockloft. The former is the guardian of the village whilst the latter is for worship of expecting official position and success in literature. The entrance gate is listed as a Grade II historic building.

A Tin Hau temple is located next to the village. Built in 1688, it was rebuilt in 1981. The three villages of Tai Tseng Wai, Ng Uk Tsuen and Shing Uk Tsuen all share the gods hall in Tai Tseng Wai and the Tin Hau temple near Ng Uk Tsuen.

A 62m-tall hill called Tai Tseng Shan (大井山) is located directly north of the village. It features a luxuriant vegetation that serves as a feng shui wood that protects the village.
