= Tai Tseng Wai =

Walled village in Hong Kong

Coordinates: 22.462993°N 114.020643°E

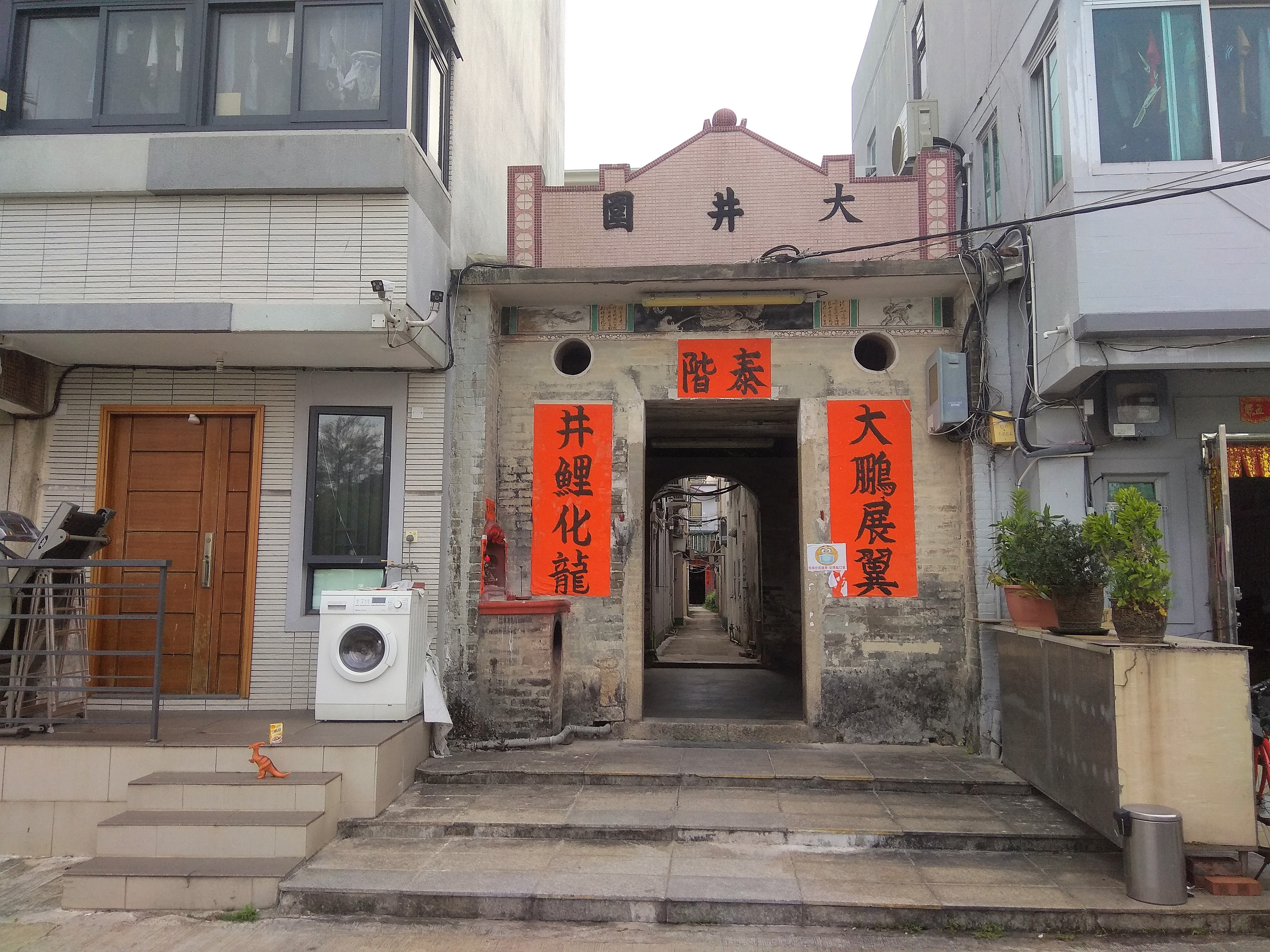
Entrance gate of Tai Tseng Wai in 2020.

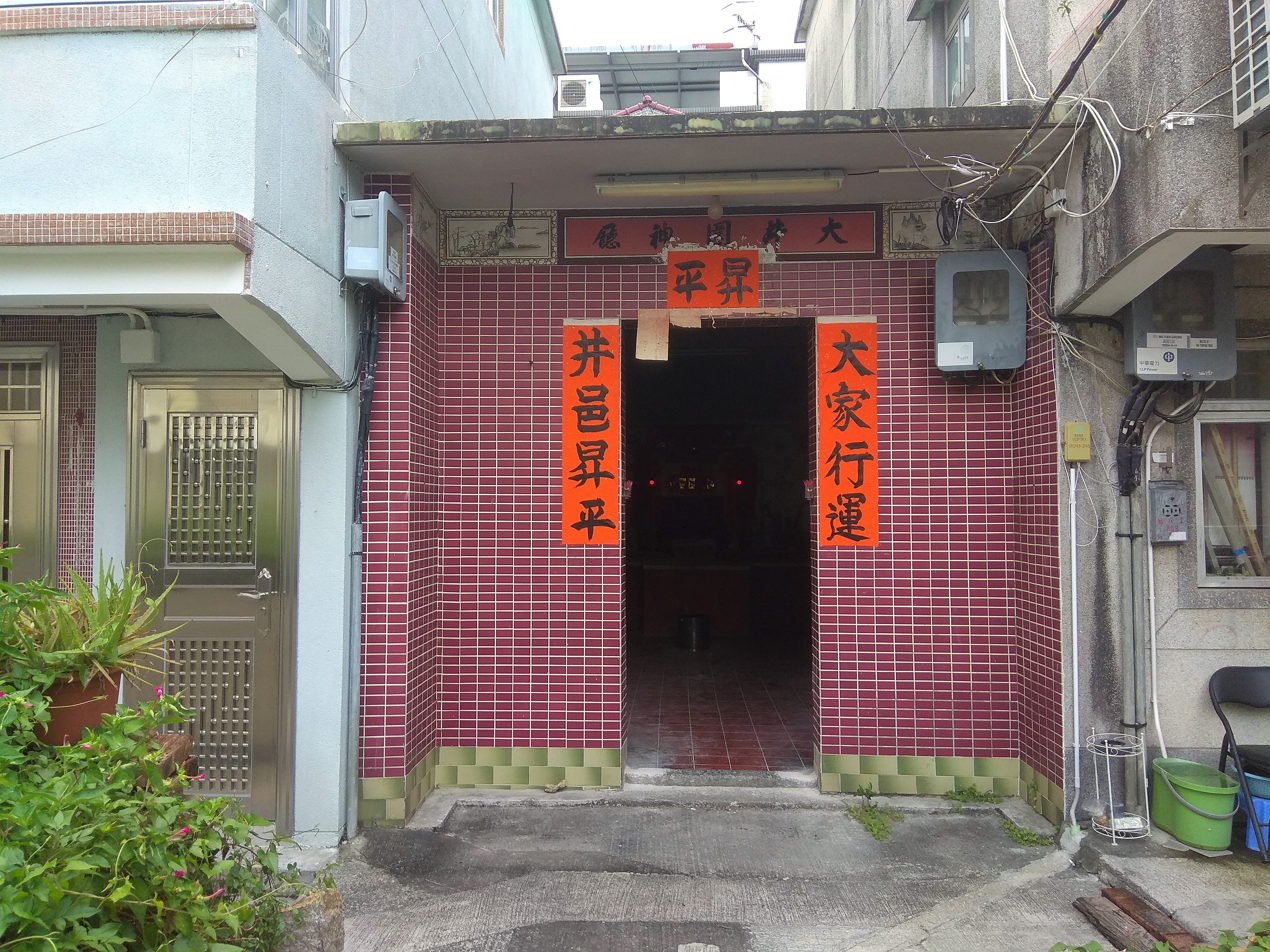
Village shrine of Tai Tseng Wai in 2020.

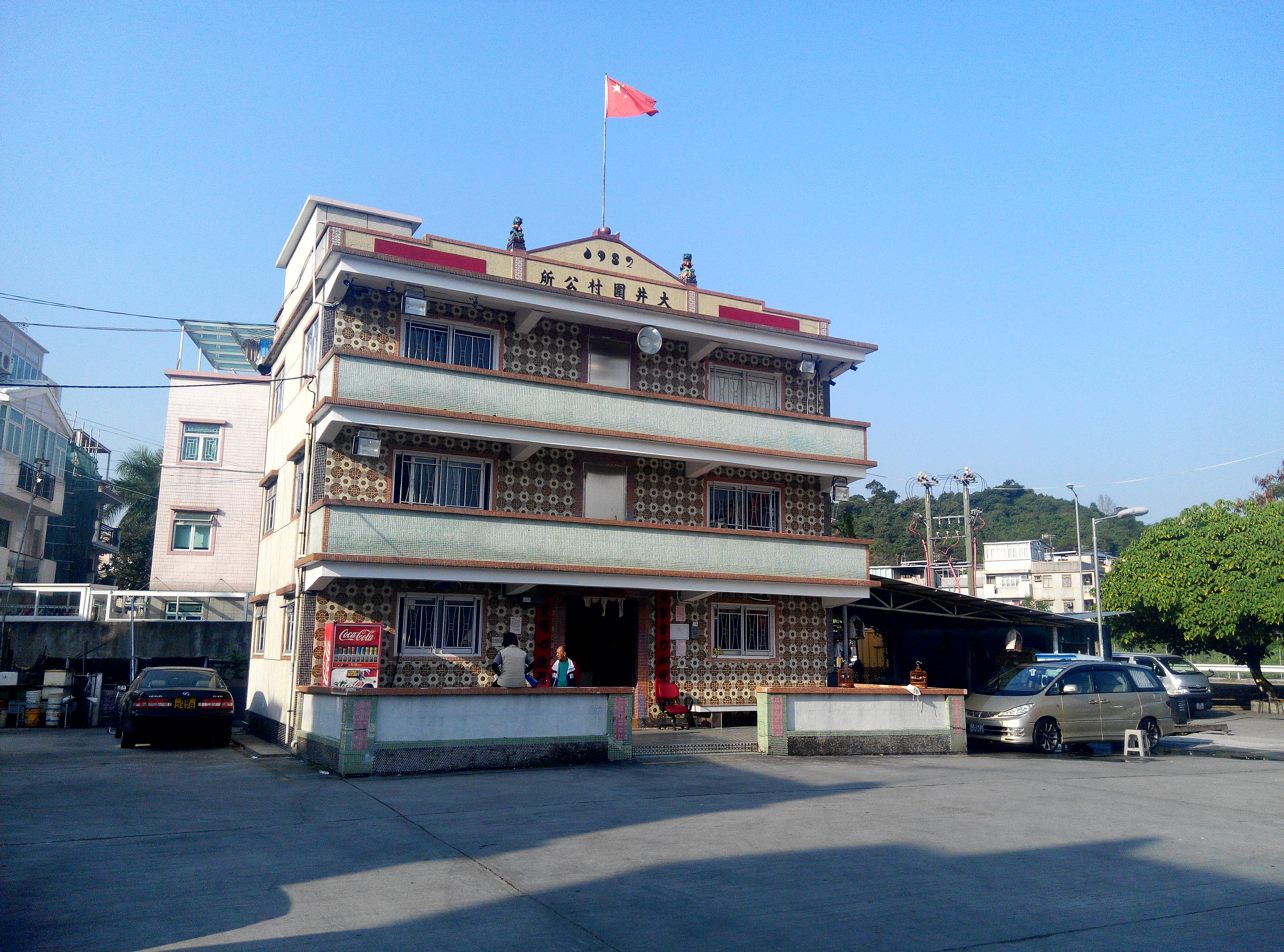
Tai Tseng Wai Village Office in December 2014.

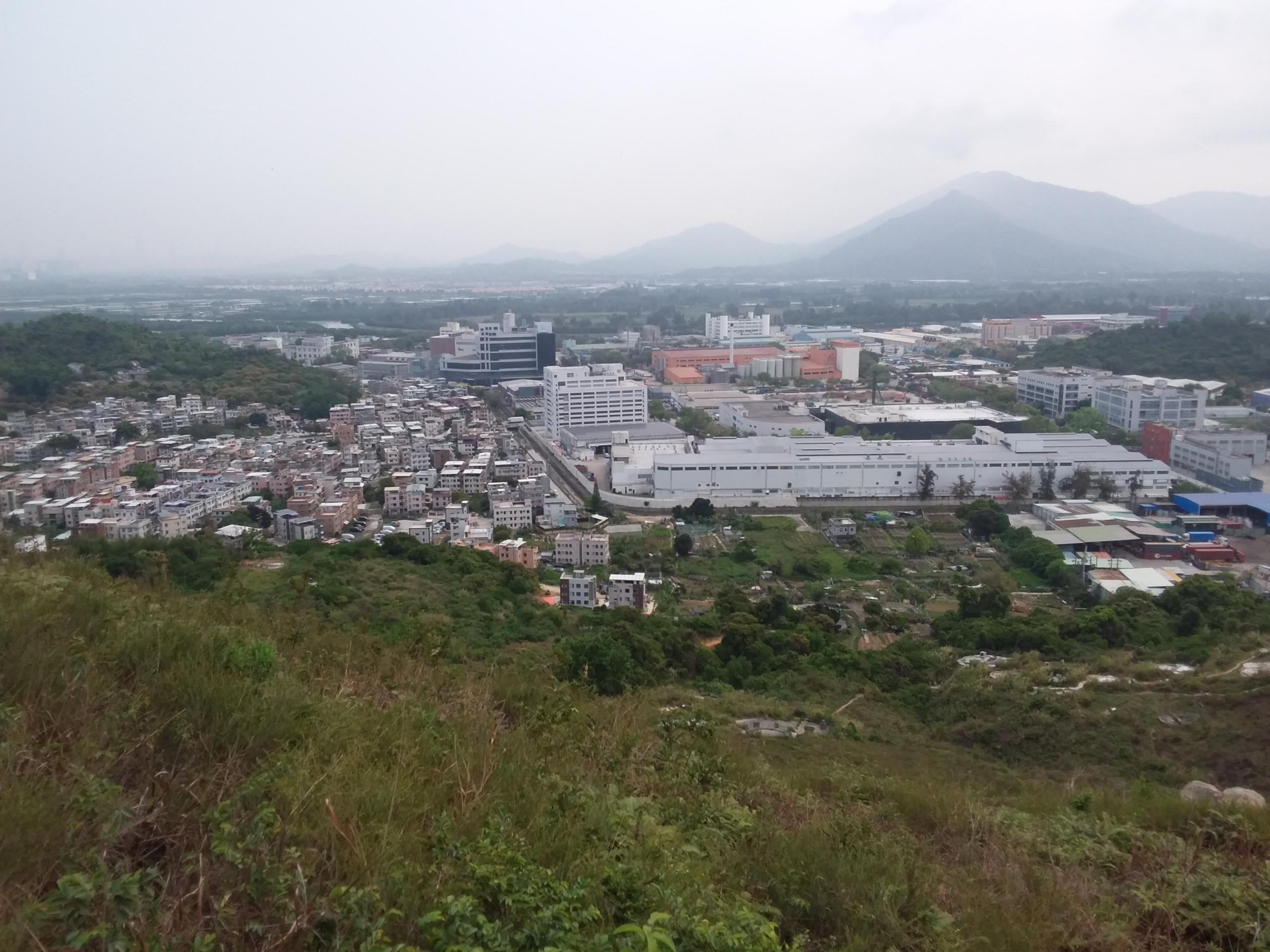
View of Tai Tseng Wai (left) and Yuen Long Industrial Estate (right) from Kai Shan.

Tai Tseng Wai (Chinese: 大井圍) is a walled village in Wang Chau, Yuen Long District, Hong Kong.

== Location ==
Tai Tseng Wai is located in the northern part of Wang Chau, north of Kai Shan and Yuen Long Industrial Estate, next to the villages of Shing Uk Tsuen and Ng Uk Tsuen. The area north of the villages, Fung Lok Wai (豐樂圍), features fish ponds.

Tai Tseng is the collective name of the area which includes the three villages in the north of Wang Chau, namely Shing Uk Tsuen, Ng Uk Tsuen and Tai Tseng Wai.

== Administration ==
Tai Tseng Wai is a recognized village under the New Territories Small House Policy. It is one of the 37 villages represented within the Ping Shan Rural Committee. For electoral purposes, Tai Tseng Wai is part of the Ping Shan North constituency.

== History ==
Tai Tseng Wai was settled approximately 500 years ago. Historically, the five surnames of the village were Cheng, Leung, Shing, Lam and Tang, with the Leung and Cheng having arrived first. All of the families came from Tai Peng, Tung Kwun in Guangdong. The villagers people were supporting themselves through fishing and farming in the area.

== Features ==
The three villages of Tai Tseng Wai, Ng Uk Tsuen and Shing Uk Tsuen all share the gods hall in Tai Tseng Wai and the Tin Hau temple near Ng Uk Tsuen.

== See also ==
- Walled villages of Hong Kong
