= Darco (disambiguation) =

Darco is a modern artist

Darco may also refer to:

- Darco company D'Addario
- Darco, champion horse of Ludo Philippaerts

== See also ==
- Darko (given name)
- Darko (surname)
