= Darko (given name) =

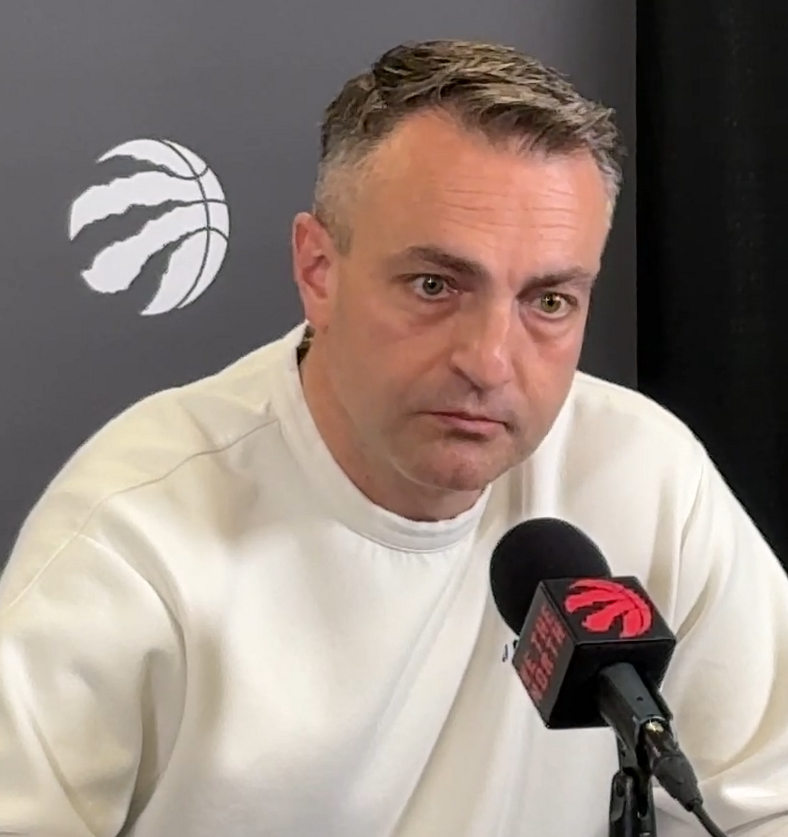
Darko Rajaković

Darko (pronounced [dǎːrko]) is a common South Slavic masculine given name. It is derived from the Slavic root dar 'gift'. Its oldest mention is from the 14th century, included in the Dečani chrysobulls (1330).

== Notable people ==
- Darko Angelov, Macedonian diplomat
- Darko Anić (chess player) (born 1957), Croatian chess grandmaster
- Darko Anić (footballer) (born 1974), Serbian footballer
- Darko Bajo (born 1999), Croatian basketballer
- Darko Balaban (born 1989), Serbian basketball player
- Darko Belojević (born 1960), Yugoslav-Serbian footballer and coach
- Darko Bodul (born 1989), Bosnian-Croatian footballer
- Darko Bošković (born 1987), Montenegrin footballer
- Darko Božović (born 1978), Montenegrin footballer
- Darko Brašanac (born 1992), Serbian footballer
- Darko Bratina (1942–1997), Italian sociologist and politician
- Darko Brljak (born 1984), Slovenian footballer
- Darko Butorović (born 1970), Croatian footballer
- Darko Čeferin (born 1968), Slovenian football referee
- Darko Čordaš (born 1976), Serbian footballer
- Donnie Darko (1972-1988), Living Receiver, Destroyer of Tangent Universe
- Darko Damjanovski (born 1981), Macedonian skier
- Darko Dimitrov (born 1973), Macedonian record producer
- Darko Djukič (born 1980), Slovenian footballer
- Darko Djurdjević (born 1987), Serbian footballer
- Darko Domijan (1952–2016), Yugoslav-Croatian singer
- Darko Dražić (born 1963), Yugoslav-Croatian footballer and coach
- Darko Drinić (born 1981), Serbian footballer
- Darko Dunjić (born 1981), Serbian footballer
- Darko Fejsa (born 1987), Serbian footballer
- Darko Filipović (born 1981), Serbian singer
- Darko Franić (born 1987), Croatian footballer
- Darko Glishikj (born 1991), Macedonian footballer
- Darko Grubor (1962–2016), Serbian sports executive
- Darko Horvat (born 1973), Croatian footballer
- Darko Ilić (born 2004), German footballer
- Darko Janacković (born 1967), Serbian-French football coach
- Darko Jelčić (born 1965), Yugoslav drummer
- Darko Jevtić (born 1993), Swiss footballer
- Darko Jorgić (born 1998), Slovenian table tennis player
- Darko Jovandić (born 1982), Serbian footballer
- Darko Jozinović (born 1970), Croatian footballer
- Darko Jukic (born 1990), Danish basketballer
- Darko Karadžić (born 1989), Montenegrin footballer
- Darko Karapetrovič (born 1976), Slovenian footballer
- Darko Kolić (born 1971), Serbian footballer
- Darko Kovačević (born 1973), Serbian footballer
- Darko Kralj (born 1971), Croatian Paralympic shot putter
- Darko Krsteski (born 1971), Macedonian footballer
- Darko Lazić (singer) (born 1991), Serbian singer
- Darko Lazić (footballer) (born 1994), Serbian footballer
- Darko Lazović (born 1990), Serbian footballer
- Darko Ljubojević (born 1975), Bosnian footballer
- Darko Lovrić (born 1980), Serbian footballer
- Darko Lukanović (born 1984), Yugoslav-Swedish footballer
- Darko Macan (born 1966), Croatian author and illustrator
- Darko Maletić (born 1980), Bosnian footballer
- Darko Marić (born 1975), Serbian footballer
- Darko Marković (born 1987), Montenegrin footballer
- Darko Martinović (born 1982), Bosnian handballer
- Darko Matić (born 1980), Bosnian footballer
- Darko Matijašević (born 1968), Bosnian Serb politician
- Darko Mavrak (born 1969), Yugoslav footballer
- Darko Maver, a fictional Yugoslav artist invented as a hoax
- Darko Micevski (born 1992), Macedonian footballer
- Darko Miladin (born 1979), Croatian footballer
- Darko Milanič (born 1967), Slovenian footballer
- Darko Miličić (born 1985), Serbian basketball player
- Darko Milinović (born 1963), Croatian politician
- Darko Mitrevski (born 1971), Macedonian film director
- Darko Nestorović (born 1965), Bosnian footballer and coach
- Darko Pahlić (born 1963), Croatian basketball player
- Darko Pančev (born 1965), Macedonian footballer
- Darko Pavićević (born 1986), Montenegrin footballer
- Darko Perić (footballer) (born 1978), Croatian footballer
- Darko Perović (born 1965), Serbian comic-book artist and writer
- Darko Pešić (born 1992), Montenegrin athlete competing in the combined events
- Darko Pivaljević (born 1975), Serbian footballer
- Darko Planinić (born 1990), Croatian basketball player
- Darko Raca (born 1977), Bosnian footballer
- Darko Raić-Sudar (born 1972), Croatian footballer
- Darko Rajaković (born 1979), Serbian basketball coach
- Darko Rakočević (born 1981), Serbian footballer
- Darko Ramovš (born 1973), Serbian footballer and sporting executive
- Darko F. Ribnikar (1878–1914), Serbian journalist
- Darko Rundek (born 1956), Croatian singer-songwriter
- Darko Šarović (born 1990), Serbian sprinter
- Darko Savić (born 1979), Serbian footballer
- Darko Sokolov (born 1986), Macedonian basketball player
- Darko Spalević (born 1977), Serbian footballer
- Darko Stanić (born 1978), Serbian handball player
- Darko Šuškavčević (born 1974), Montenegrin footballer
- Darko Suvin (born 1930), Croatian-Canadian academic and literary critic
- Darko Tasevski (born 1984), Macedonian footballer
- Darko Tešović (born 1970), Serbian footballer
- Darko Tofiloski (born 1986), Macedonian footballer
- Darko Vargec (born 1972), Yugoslav-Serbian footballer and manager
- Darko Vujović (born 1962), Montenegrin footballer
- Darko Vukašinović (born 1985), Montenegrin footballer
- Darko Vukić (born 1968), Croatian footballer
- Darko Zec (born 1989), Slovenian footballer
- Darko Živanović (born 1987), Serbian long-distance runner
- Darko Jabar (born 1993), Kurdish writer

== Fictional Characters ==
- Darko Brevic, character in GTA IV

== See also ==
- Darko (disambiguation)
