= Shing Uk Tsuen =

Village in Hong Kong

Coordinates: 22.46286°N 114.01892°E

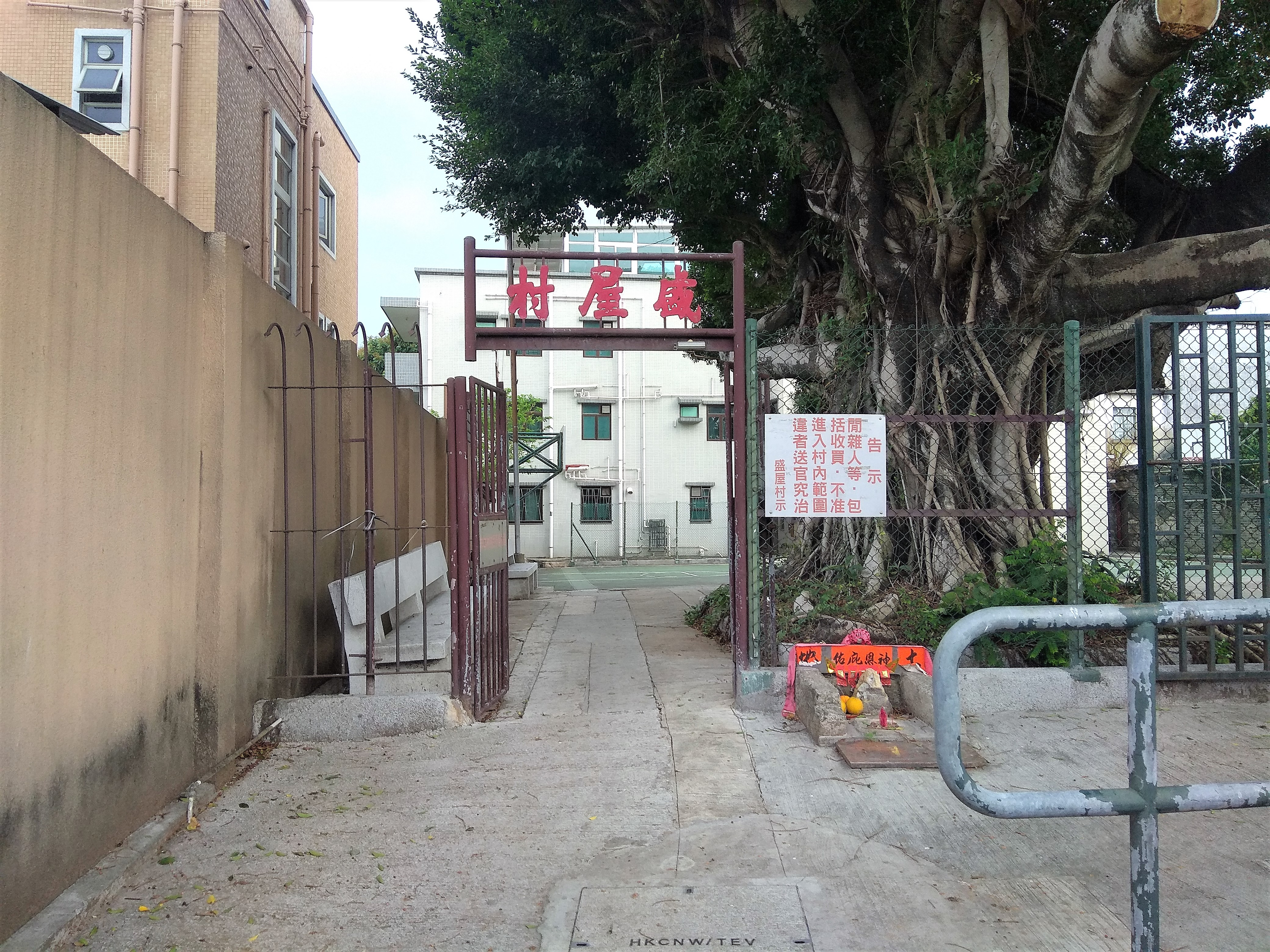
Shing Uk Tsuen village entrance in 2020.

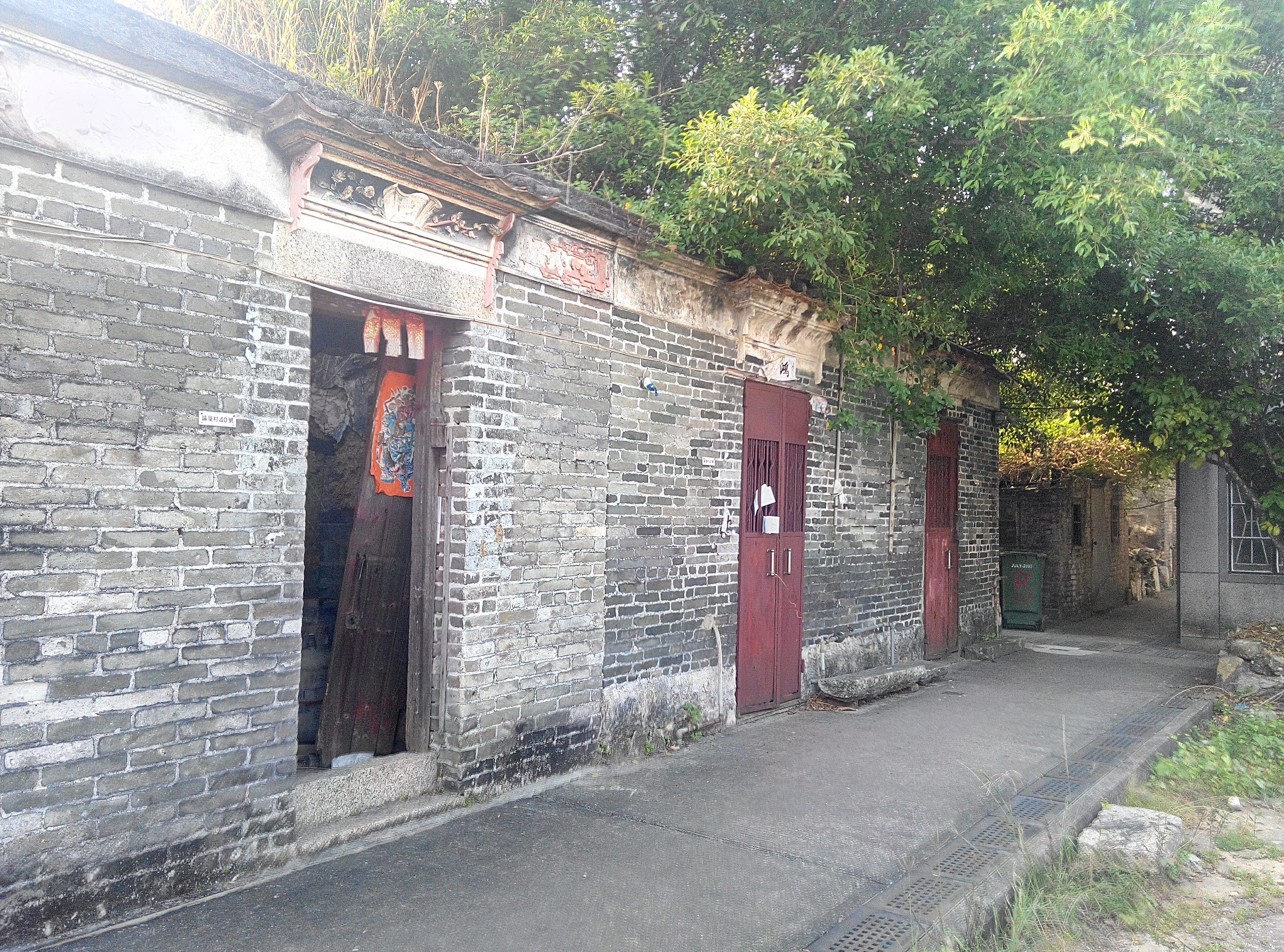
Old houses in Shing Uk Tsuen. Nos. 39–41 in December 2014.

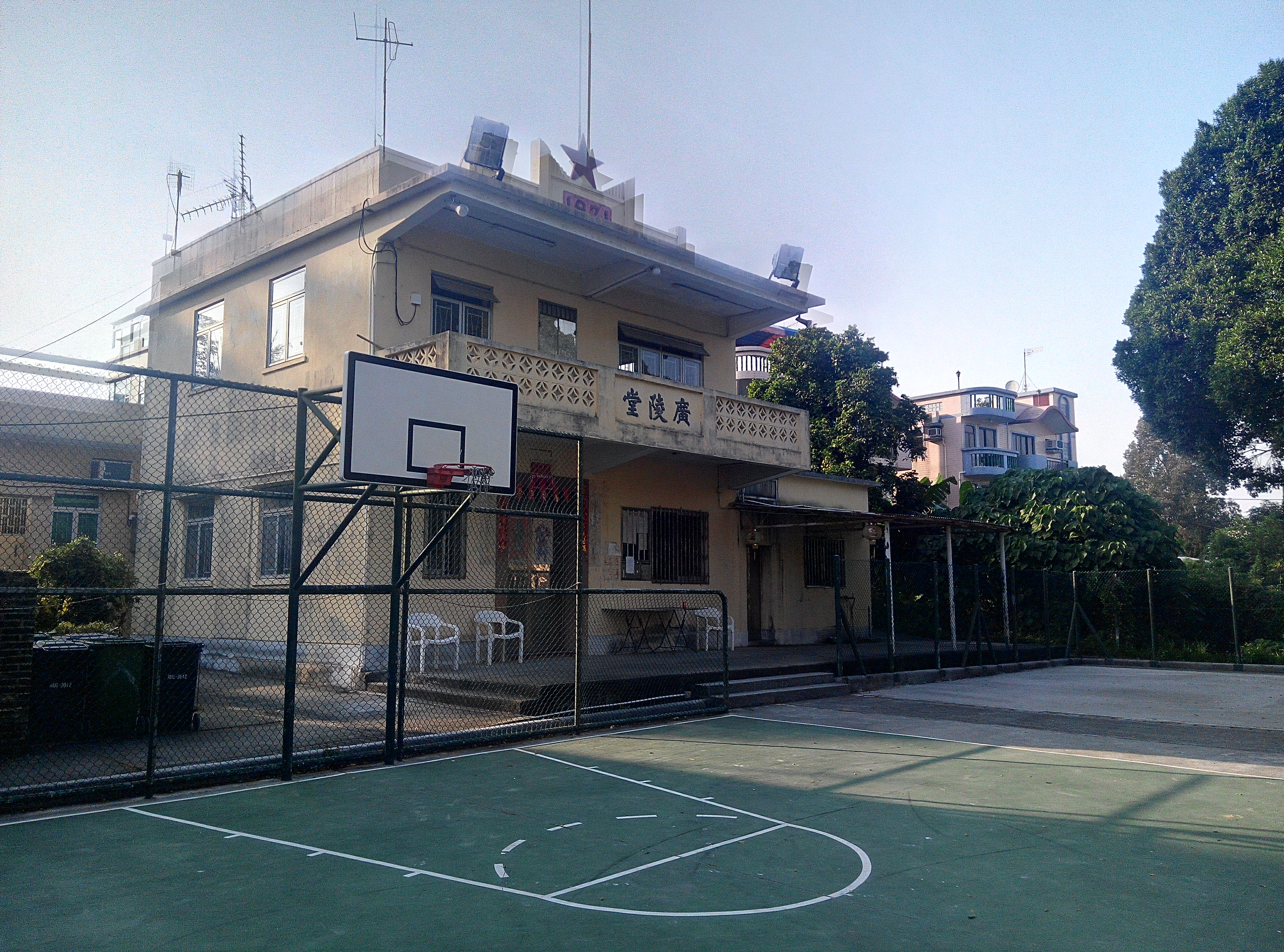
Kwong Ling Tong (盛屋村) in Shing Uk Tsuen serves as the village office. Taken in December 2014.

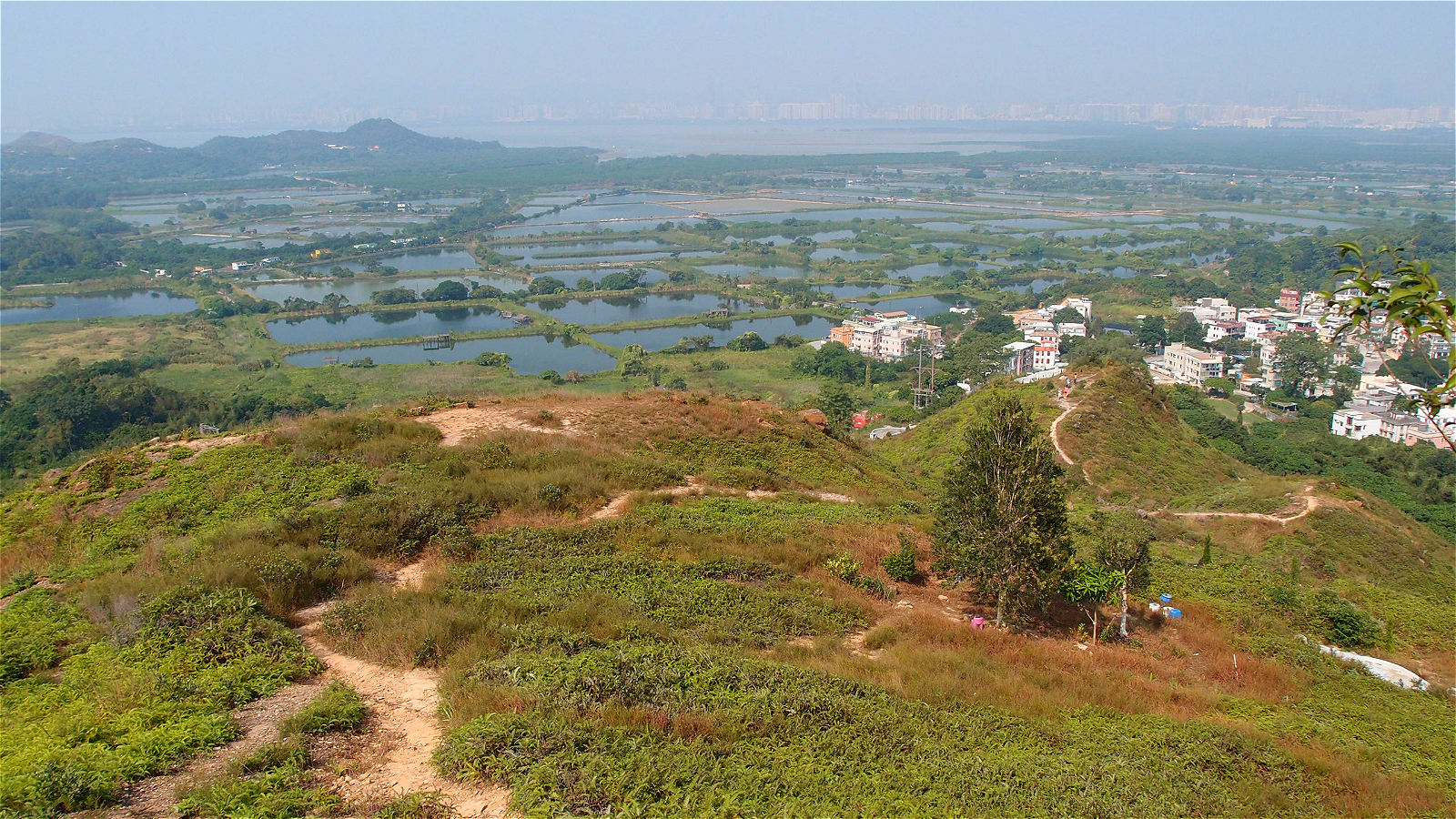
Shing Uk Tsuen and Fung Lok Wai viewed from Kai Shan in November 2014.

Shing Uk Tsuen (Chinese: 盛屋村) is a village in Wang Chau, Yuen Long District, Hong Kong.

== Location ==
Shing Uk Tsuen is located north of Kai Shan and Yuen Long Industrial Estate, next to the villages of Tai Tseng Wai and Ng Uk Tsuen. The area north of the villages, Fung Lok Wai (豐樂圍), features fish ponds.

== Administration ==
Shing Uk Tsuen is a recognized village under the New Territories Small House Policy. It is one of the 37 villages represented within the Ping Shan Rural Committee. For electoral purposes, Shing Uk Tsuen is part of the Ping Shan North constituency.

== History ==
Shing Uk Tsuen was a single-clan village established by the Shing (盛) who moved from Nga Tsin Tsuen (衙前村) in Ping Shan around 1466.

== Features ==
A row of five houses, Nos. 39, 40, 41, 42 and 43, was built no later than the 1870s in the last row of four rows of houses in the historic village. The houses have been vacated. They have been listed as Grade III historic buildings.

The three villages of Tai Tseng Wai, Ng Uk Tsuen and Shing Uk Tsuen all share the gods hall in Tai Tseng Wai and the Tin Hau temple near Ng Uk Tsuen.
