= Vojnův Městec =

- Market town
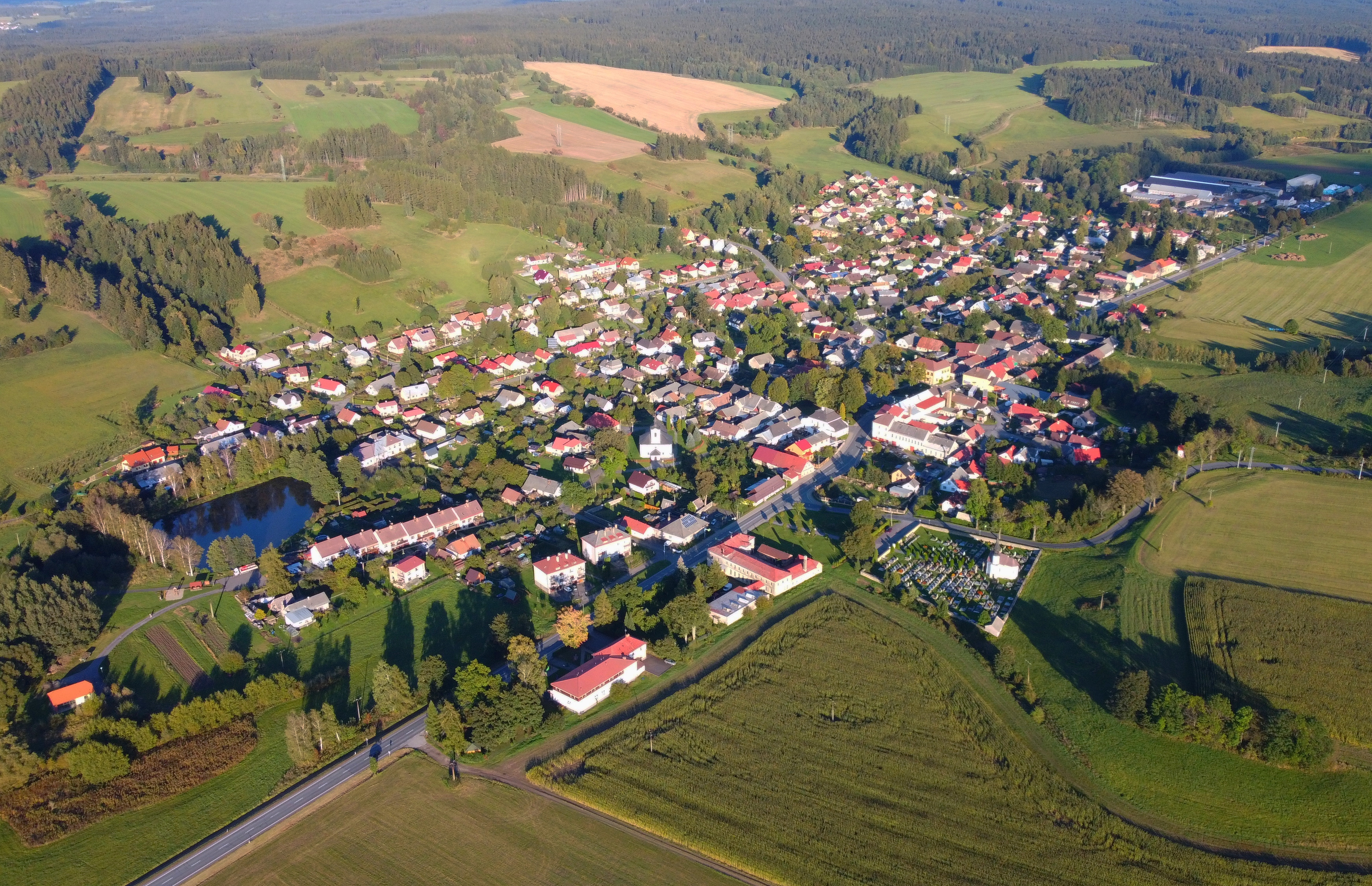
- Aerial view

- Flag Coat of arms

- Location in the Czech Republic
- Coordinates: 49°40′46″N 15°52′42″E
- Country: Czech Republic
- Region: Vysočina
- District: Žďár nad Sázavou
- First mentioned: 1293

Area
  - Total: 16.49 km^{2} (6.37 sq mi)
- Elevation: 583 m (1,913 ft)

Population (2026-01-01)
  - Total: 792
  - Density: 48.0/km^{2} (124/sq mi)
- Time zone: UTC+1 (CET)
  - Summer (DST): UTC+2 (CEST)
- Postal code: 592 22
- Website: www.vojnuvmestec.cz

Vojnův Městec (Czech pronunciation: [ˈvojnuːf ˈmɲɛstɛts]) is a market town in Žďár nad Sázavou District in the Vysočina Region of the Czech Republic. It has about 800 inhabitants.

== Administrative division ==
Vojnův Městec consists of two municipal parts (in brackets population according to the 2021 census):

- Vojnův Městec (749)
- Nová Huť (4)

== Etymology ==
In Czech, the name literally means "Vojna's small town".

== Geography ==
Vojnův Městec is located about 13 kilometres (8 mi) northeast of Žďár nad Sázavou and 37 km (23 mi) northeast of Jihlava. The municipal territory extends into three geomorphological regions: the northwestern part lies in the Iron Mountains, the southwestern part lies in the Upper Sázava Hills and the eastern part lies in the Upper Svratka Highlands. The highest point is at 795 m (2,608 ft) above sea level.

The brook Městecký potok flows through the market town. The upper course of the Sázava River flows through the woods in the eastern part of the territory. There is the Malé Dářko fishpond in the municipal territory; Velké Dářko, the largest fishpond in the Vysočina Region, is located just beyond the southern municipal border. The Radostínské rašeliniště National Nature Reserve is located between these two fishponds. The whole territory of Vojnův Městec lies within the Žďárské vrchy Protected Landscape Area.

== History ==
THe first written mention of Vojnův Městec (initially named Jindřichova Ves) is in a deed of the monastery in Žďár nad Sázavou from 1293. The monastery probably founded the village. Around 1357, when it was called Münprech, the village was acquired by the Vojna of Štětí noble family and promoted to a market town. In the 1430s, the market town began to be called Vojnův Městec after the last member of the Vojna family, Jan Vojna.

== Demographics ==
Historical population

Year	Pop.	±%
1869	1,345	—
1880	1,402	+4.2%
1890	1,362	−2.9%
1900	1,418	+4.1%
1910	1,436	+1.3%

Year	Pop.	±%
1921	1,321	−8.0%
1930	1,407	+6.5%
1950	974	−30.8%
1961	949	−2.6%
1970	856	−9.8%

Year	Pop.	±%
1980	769	−10.2%
1991	727	−5.5%
2001	707	−2.8%
2011	795	+12.4%
2021	753	−5.3%

Source: Censuses

== Transport ==
The I/37 road from Pardubice to Žďár nad Sázavou runs through the market town.

== Sights ==
The main landmark of Vojnův Městec is the Church of Saint Andrew. Originally a Gothic church, it was rebuilt in the Baroque style in 1770.

An architecturally valuable building is the large Baroque house No. 8 that once served as an inn.

== Notable people ==
- Jaroslav Jiřík (1939–2011), ice hockey player
