= Jetted pond =

A jetted pond is a type of fish pond that features a large water discharge. Jetted ponds are used in fish rearing to create an environment with continuous water flow. The location of a jetted tub should have a permanent source of water, major debit, and flow throughout the year. Jetted ponds are built to mimic the natural environments of fish grown in the wild.
