= Fung Lok Wai =

Area in Hong Kong

Coordinates: 22.470832°N 114.020086°E

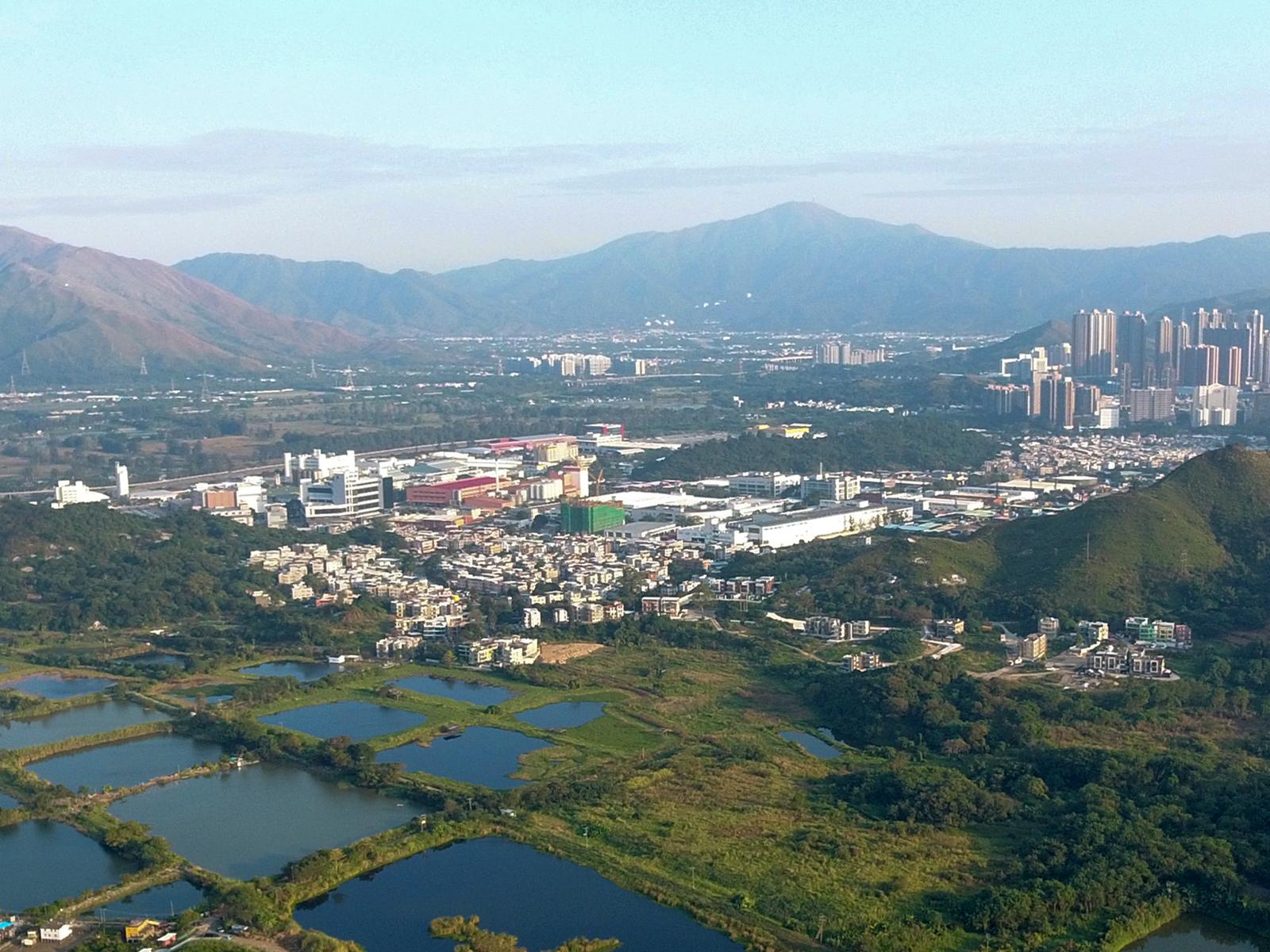
Fung Lok Wai (foreground) and Wang Chau (center).

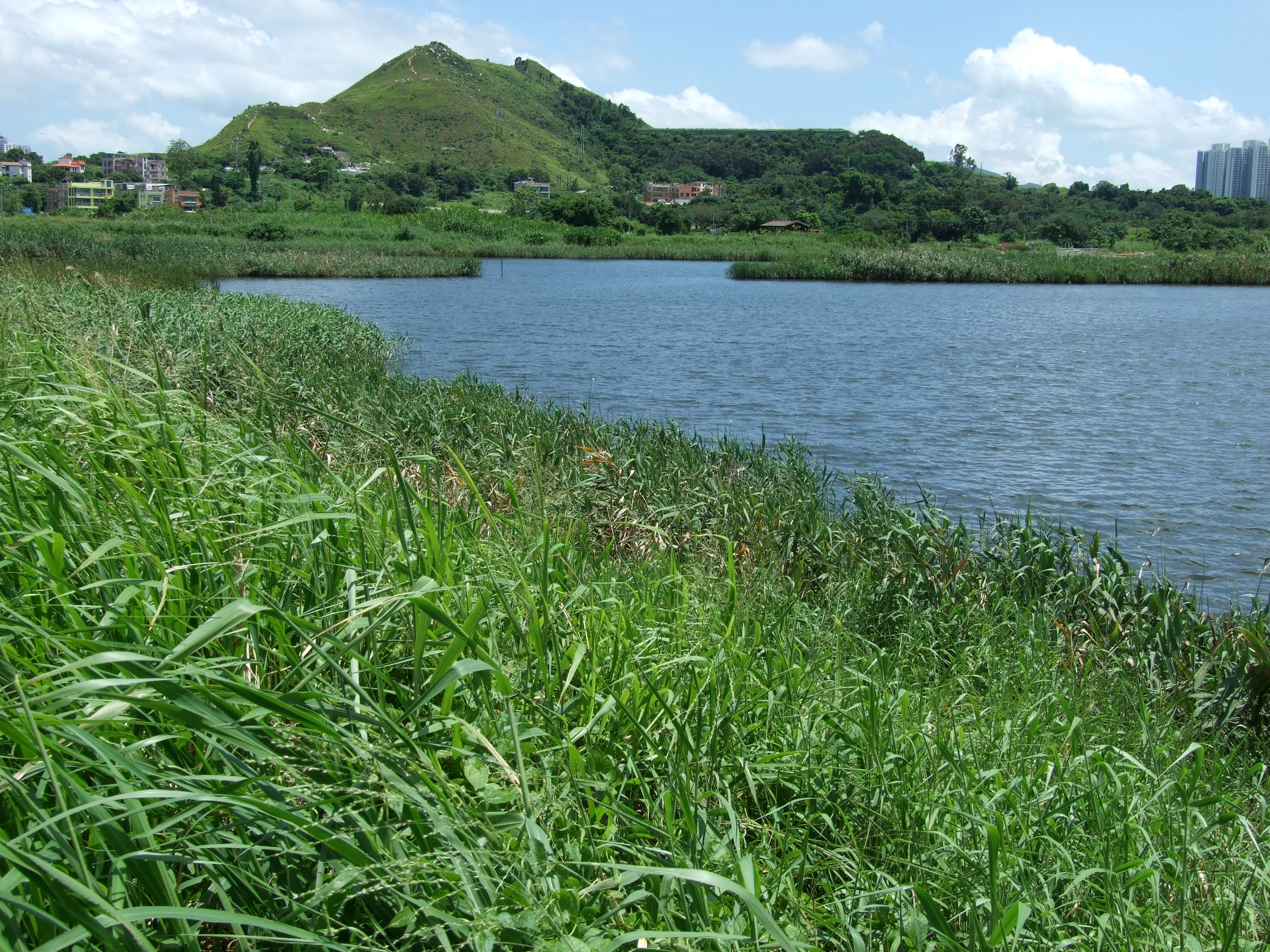
Kai Shan of Wang Chau viewed from Fung Lok Wai.

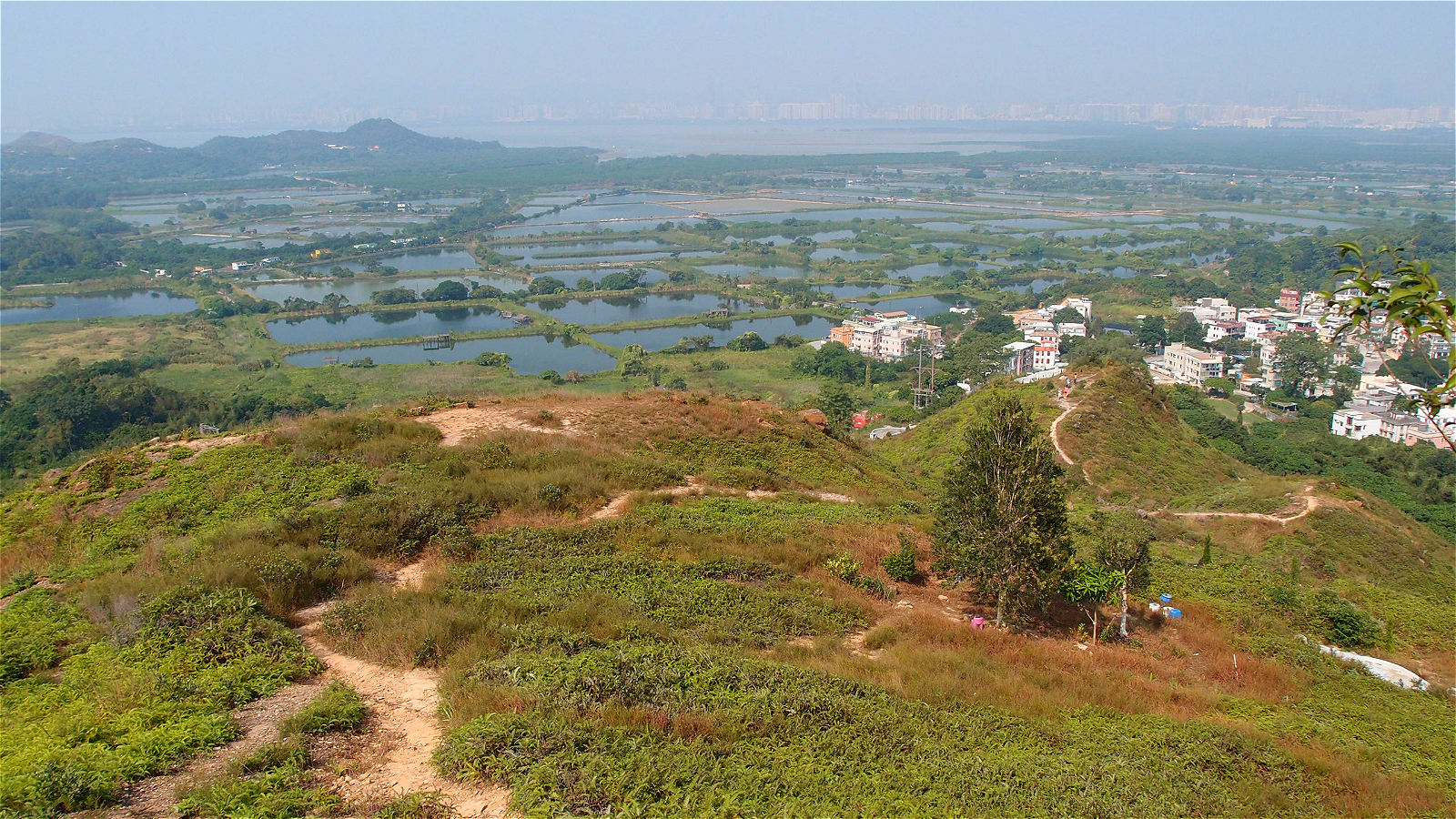
Fung Lok Wai and Shing Uk Tsuen viewed from Kai Shan.

Fung Lok Wai (Chinese: 豐樂圍) is an area of Yuen Long District that features fish ponds.

== Location ==
Fung Lok Wai is located south of the Inner Deep Bay, between Yuen Long Industrial Estate and Hong Kong Wetland Park. Immediately south of Fung Lok Wai are the villages of is Ng Uk Tsuen and Shing Uk Tsuen of Wang Chau. Kai Shan is located to the immediate southwest of Fung Lok Wai.

== History ==
In the early 20th century, and before the 1920s, the area was the site of swamp and marsh. The mangrove swamp was initially reclaimed for rice cultivation. During the period between 1938 and 1945 the Deep Bay area was transformed into gei wai. The fish ponds were first used in the 1920s for harvesting of shrimp, fish and crabs. They were historically owned by people from Shek Ha in mainland China and several Tanka families. By 1974 the land use of the area was converted to ponds for raising fresh water fish.

== Conservation ==
- A part of "Inner Deep Bay", covering 1,036 hectares and covering an area north of the ponds as well as the northern section of the ponds, was designated as a Site of Special Scientific Interest in 1986.

== See also ==
- Agriculture and aquaculture in Hong Kong
- Nam Sang Wai
- Mai Po Marshes
- Shan Pui River
