= Darko Grubor =

- Born: 16 October 1962; Belgrade, SFR Yugoslavia
- Died: 2 June 2016 (aged 53); Belgrade, Serbia
- Resting place: New Bežanija Cemetery, Belgrade
- Education: University of Belgrade Faculty of Law
- Occupation: General secretary
- Years active: 2008–2016
- Employer: FK Partizan

Darko Grubor (Serbian Cyrillic: Дарко Грубор; 16 October 1962 – 2 June 2016) was the general secretary of FK Partizan.

Preceded by Gordan Petrić	General secretary of FK Partizan; 2008–2016	Succeeded by Miloš Vazura
