= Darko Franić =

Croatian footballer (born 1987)

Personal information
- Date of birth: 22 March 1987 (age 39)
- Place of birth: Split, SFR Yugoslavia
- Height: 1.87 m (6 ft 2 in)
- Position: Goalkeeper

Youth career
- Hajduk Split

Senior career*
Years	Team	Apps	(Gls)
2005–2010	Hajduk Split	0	(0)
2006–2007	→ Zadar (loan)	15	(0)
2008	→ Mosor (loan)	12	(1)
2008	→ Junak Sinj (loan)	12	(0)
2009	→ Mosor (loan)	9	(0)
2009–2010	→ Hrvatski Dragovoljac (loan)	18	(0)
2010	Hrvatski Dragovoljac	2	(0)
2011–2015	Zmaj Makarska		
2015–2016	NK Župa Dubrovačka		
2016–2017	NK Jadran Tučepi		
2017	UMF Sindri	15	(0)
2017–2018	Zmaj Makarska		

International career
2002	Croatia U15	2	(0)
2002–2003	Croatia U16	7	(0)
2003	Croatia U17	6	(0)
2004	Croatia U18	5	(0)
2005–2006	Croatia U19	9	(0)
- * Club domestic league appearances and goals

Darko Franić (born 22 March 1987) is a Croatian retired football player, who last played for Zmaj Makarska.

== Club career ==
A product of Hajduk Split Academy, Franić signed a professional contract with the club in July 2005. However, he never appeared for the club as he spent the following years on loans at smaller clubs in Druga HNL (second division) such as NK Zadar, NK Mosor and NK Junak Sinj.

He then spent the 2009–10 season on loan with Zagreb-based Hrvatski Dragovoljac with whom he finished third in the 2009–10 Druga HNL and won promotion to top level. At the end of season he was released from Hajduk and joined Dragovoljac on a free transfer, but only five months later he was released by the club in early January 2011.
