= Darko Marić =

Serbian footballer (born 1975)

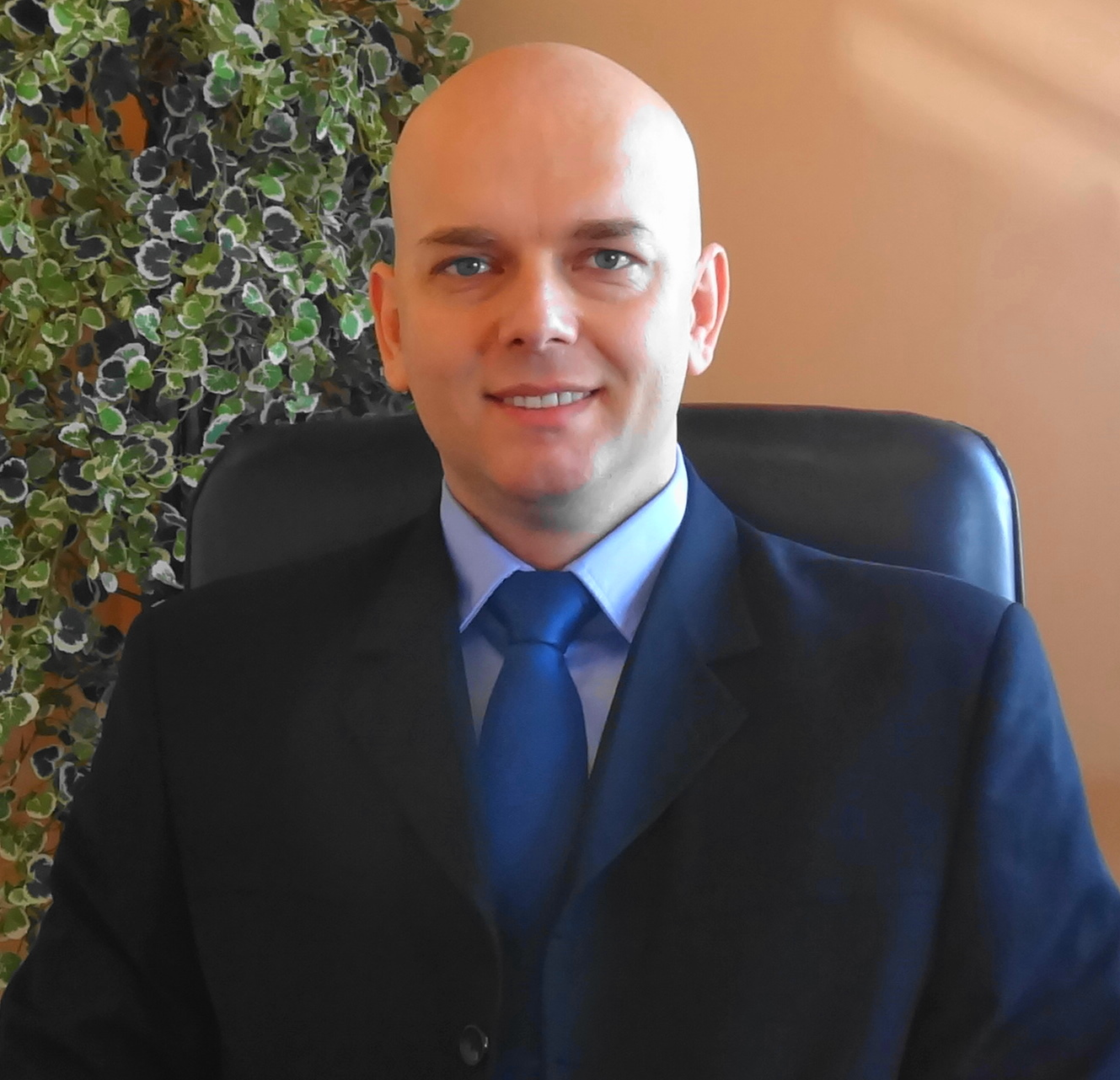

Personal information
- Date of birth: 2 September 1975 (age 51)
- Place of birth: Borča, Yugoslavia
- Height: 1.90 m (6 ft 3 in)
- Position: Forward

Youth career
- 1990–1994: OFK Beograd

Senior career*
Years	Team	Apps	(Gls)
1994–1998	OFK Beograd	22	(6)
1998–1999	Créteil		
1999–2000	Santa Clara		
2000–2001	Trayal Kruševac	17	(21)
2001–2003	Napredak Kruševac	23	(15)
2003–2004	Anagennisi Dherynia		
2004–2005	Henan Jianye		
2005	FC Brașov	14	(3)
- * Club domestic league appearances and goals

Darko Marić (born 2 September 1975 in Belgrade) is a Serbian retired football player who last played as a forward for FC Brașov.

On 8 May 2005 he suffered a head injury during the First Division match between FC Brașov and FC Argeş, when he collided with Marius Radu, needing to be transported by ambulance to the hospital. The collision was however involuntary.

== Post-playing career ==
After the retirement as a professional player, he opened up a football agency in Serbia named D.M.management. He was also director of BSK Borča. One of notable players of D.M.management is Andrew Mwesigwa, Uganda national team captain, player of Kazakhstan club, FC Ordabasy.
