= Velké Dářko =

Lake in the Czech Republic

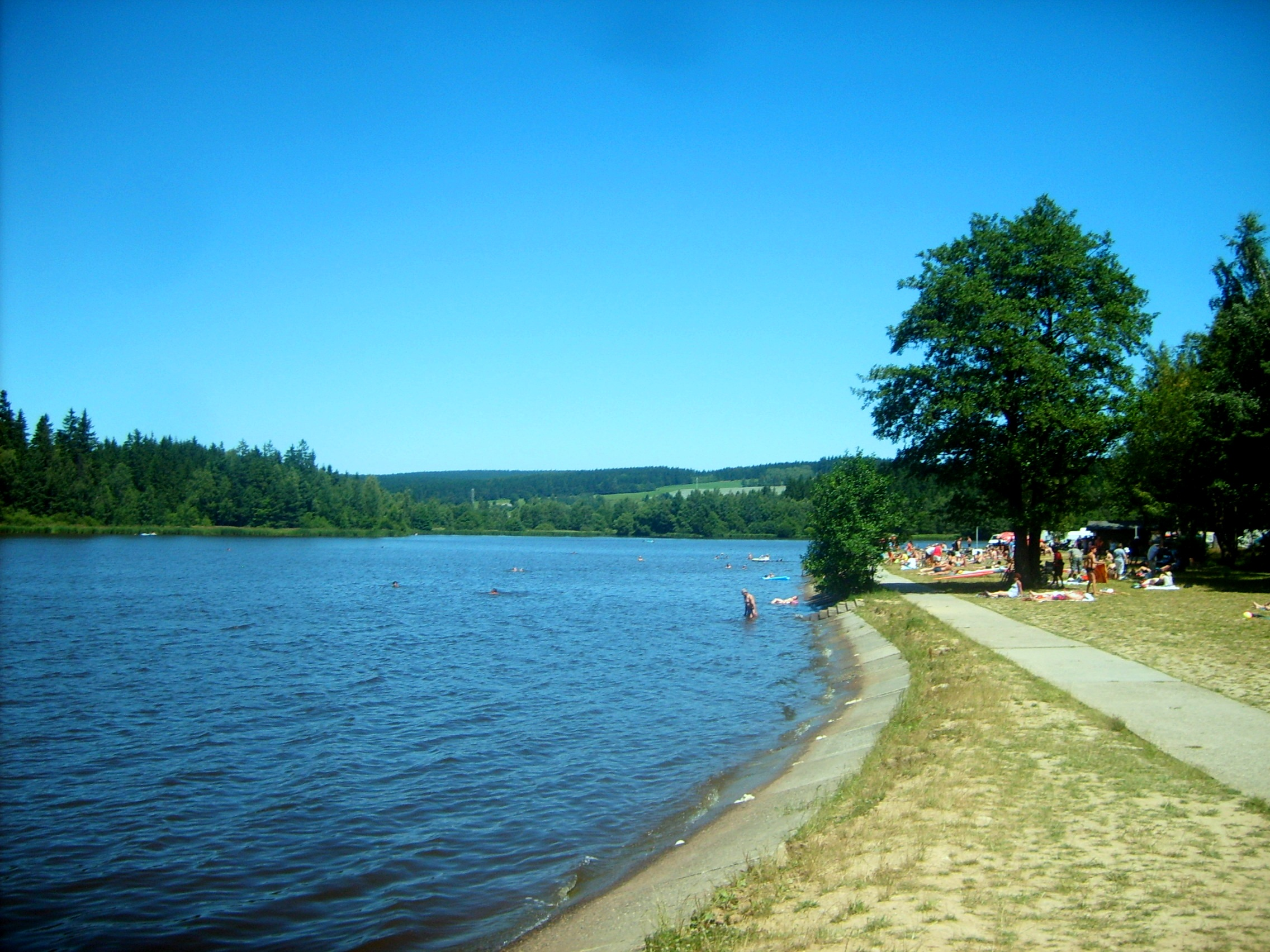

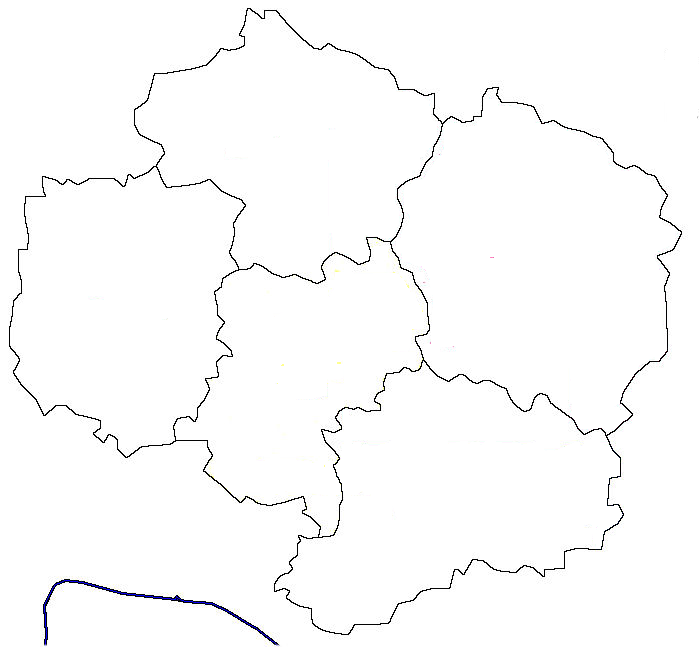
- Location within Vysočina Region
- Coordinates: 49°37′59″N 15°54′15″E
- Type: fish pond
- Basin countries: Czech Republic
- Surface area: 2.06 km^{2} (0.80 sq mi)
- Surface elevation: 610 m (2,000 ft)

Velké Dářko is the largest pond (fish pond) in the Vysočina Region of the Czech Republic. Its surface area is about 2.06 km² at an elevation of 610 m. The pond is located 10 km from Žďár nad Sázavou.
