= Darko (surname) =

Darko is an Ashanti surname. Notable people with the Ashanti surname include:

- Amma Darko (born 1956), Ghanaian novelist
- George Darko (born 1951), Ghanaian musician
- Jesse Darko (born 1993), Austrian footballer
- John Martin Darko (1945–2013), Ghanaian Roman Catholic bishop
- Kwabena Darko (born 1942), Ghanaian entrepreneur and politician
- Kwame Obeng Darko (born 1986), Ghanaian footballer and rapper
- Samuel Darko (1987), Ghanaian Medical Herbalist and Researcher

== See also ==
- Kwabena Okyere Darko-Mensah, Ghanaian politician
- Kwadwo Adjei-Darko, Ghanaian politician
