= Kai Shan =

Hill in Hong Kong

- 髻山
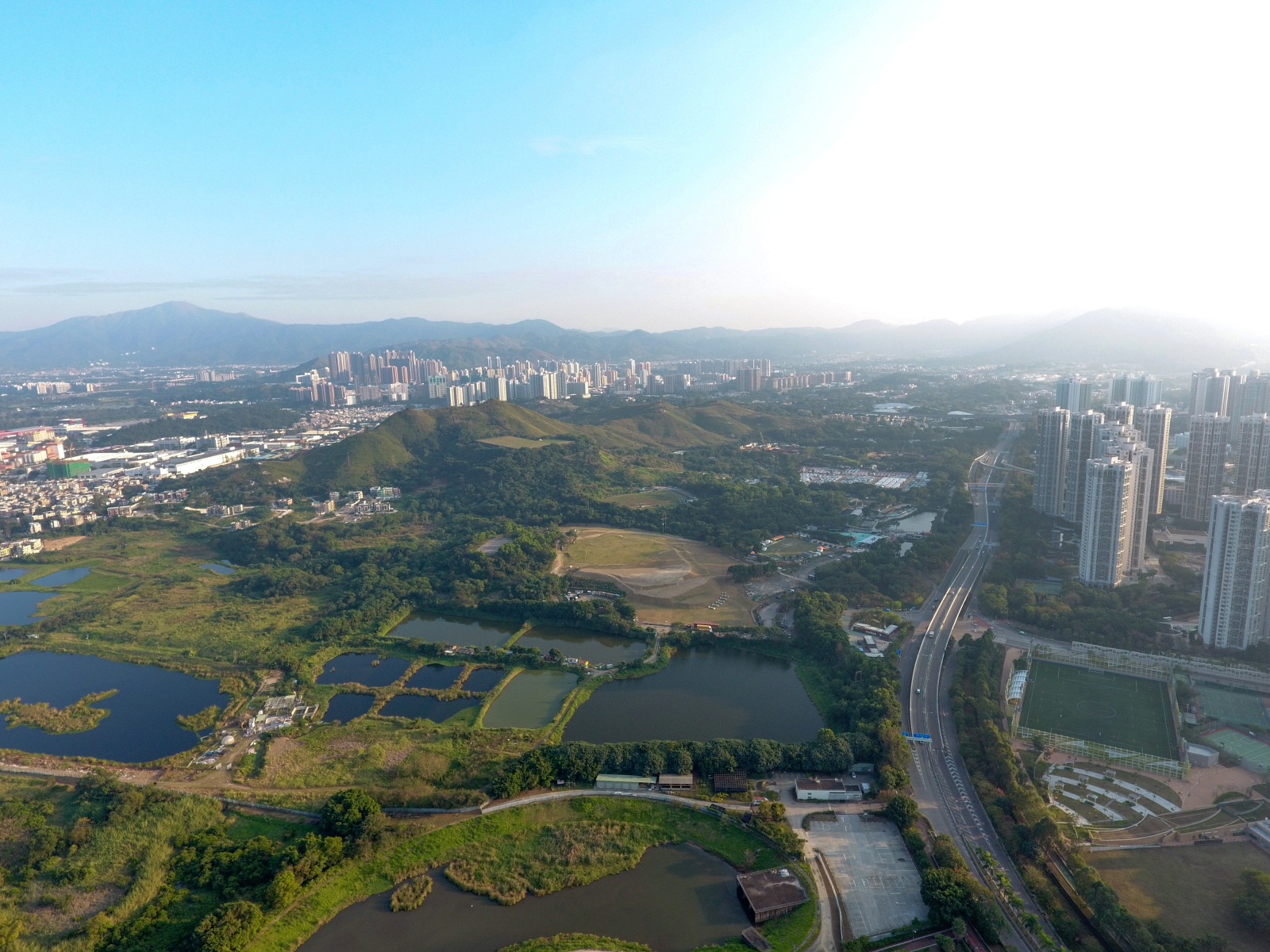
- View of Kai Shan and surrounding areas

Highest point
- Elevation: 121 m (397 ft)
- Coordinates: 22.54298°N 114.19410°E

Geography
- Location within Hong Kong
- Location: Hong Kong

Kai Shan (Chinese: 髻山) is a hill in Wang Chau, in the New Territories of Hong Kong, separating the new towns of Yuen Long and Tin Shui Wai. It has a height of 121 metres (397 ft).

Kai Shan is a private property and is owned by the Tang clan. According to reports, the hill is burned regularly to keep the vegetation low.

It has a popular neighborhood trail where locals have planted flowers and created art, the top of which has views of both Yuen Long and Shenzhen.

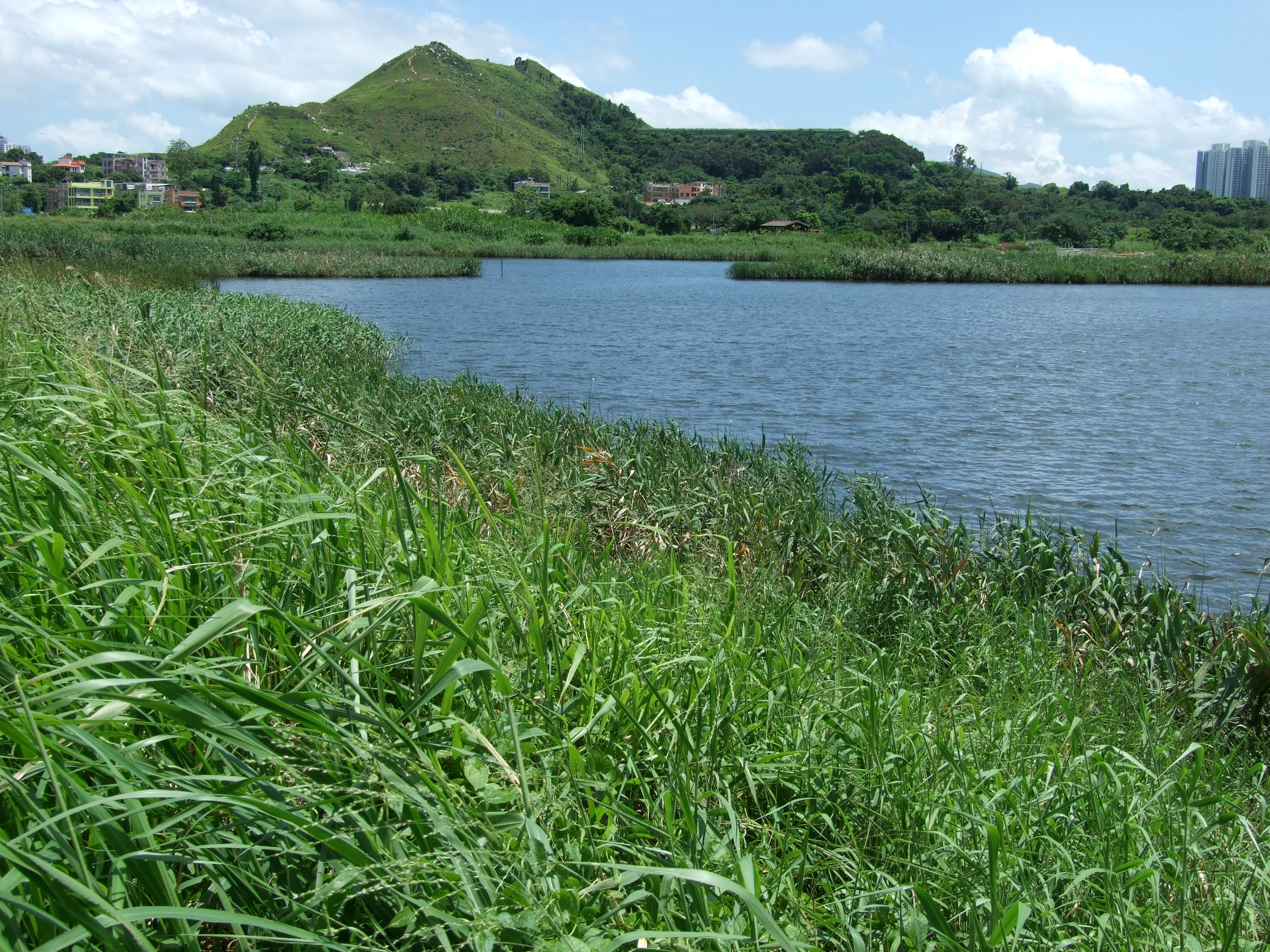
Kai Shan viewed from the fish ponds of Fung Lok Wai.

== See also ==
- Fung Lok Wai
