= Tang Clan =

Lineage in Hong Kong

- Traditional Chinese: 鄧族
- Simplified Chinese: 邓族
Transcriptions
Standard Mandarin
- Hanyu Pinyin: Dèng zú
Yue: Cantonese
- Jyutping: dang6 zuk6

The Tang Clan of Hong Kong (Chinese: 鄧族) is one of the Five Great Clans of the New Territories. The others are Man (文), Hau (侯), Pang (彭) and Liu (廖).

The Tangs are one of the region's oldest families and can trace their lineage back 30 generations in Hong Kong and 86 generations in China. In the New Territories, the clan stands about 25,000 strong.

Sharing the same surname as the Deng in China, the Tangs of Hong Kong originated from Jishui of Jiangxi province and are considered to be native Hong Kong people, as they were the first immigrants to settle in what is now Hong Kong from what is now mainland China in the 11th century. Many of the Tangs settled in Kam Tin, New Territories.

The most famous Tang village is Kat Hing Wai, a walled village with a moat. Kat Hing Wai was the last Punti village to fall under British control after the Six Day War in April 1899.

== History ==
The Tang family is the oldest, largest and most famous of the New Territories' Chinese lineages. It has been settled in the area for just over 900 years and has a long history of local dominance. It has also produced many famous scholars and officials in the tradition of large, wealthy Chinese lineages.

The Tangs in Lung Yeuk Tau (龍躍頭), in Fanling, have the strongest claim to the royal descent among their fellow clansmen, because they are the descendants of Tang Lum (鄧林), the eldest son of the princess of the southern Song dynasty (1127–1279).

The father of the princess was Emperor Gaozong of Song (June 12, 1107 – November 9, 1187), born Zhao Gou, was the tenth emperor of the Song dynasty of China, and the first emperor of the Southern Song. He reigned from 1127 to 1162. He fled south after the Jurchens overran Kaifeng in the Jingkang Incident of the Jin–Song wars, hence the beginning of the Southern Song dynasty 1127–1279. Gaozong re-established his seat of government in Lin'an (臨安; today's Hangzhou).

When the princess took refuge in the south, she was married to Tang Wai-Kap (鄧惟汲) of Kam Tin by Wai-Kap's father, Tang Yeun-Leung (鄧元亮). Tang Lum, the eldest son of the royal couple moved to Lung Yeuk Tau at the end of the Yuan dynasty. As the clan prospered it further branched out to the neighbouring area, establishing the present-day "Five Wais and Six Tsuens" within a few hundred years. The "Five Wais" (walled villages) (五圍) are Lo Wai (老圍), Ma Wat Wai (麻笏圍), Wing Ning Wai (永寧圍), Tung Kok Wai (東閣圍), also known as Ling Kok Wai (嶺角圍), San Wai (新圍), also called Kun Lung Wai (覲龍圍). The "Six Tsuens" (villages) (六村) are Ma Wat Tsuen (麻笏村), Wing Ning Tsuen (永寧村), also called Tai Tang (大廳), Tsz Tong Tsuen (祠堂村), San Uk Tsuen (新屋村), Siu Hang Tsuen (小坑村) and Kun Lung Tsuen (覲龍村).

== Customs ==
The Tangs of the area still practise traditional village customs. Apart from the communal worship in spring and autumn and Tin Hau Festival, a lantern lighting ceremony is also held for the new born baby boys on the fifteenth day of the first Lunar month. On the first day of the second Lunar month there are ancestral worship ceremony and vegetarian feast. Moreover, Tai Ping Ching Chiu Festival (meaning "the Purest Sacrifice Celebrated for Great Peace"), also known locally as dajiao is held once every decade and celebrated by the whole Tang Clan as well as people from the neighbouring villages. The next festival will be held in December 2025.

== Tang Chung Ling Ancestral Hall ==
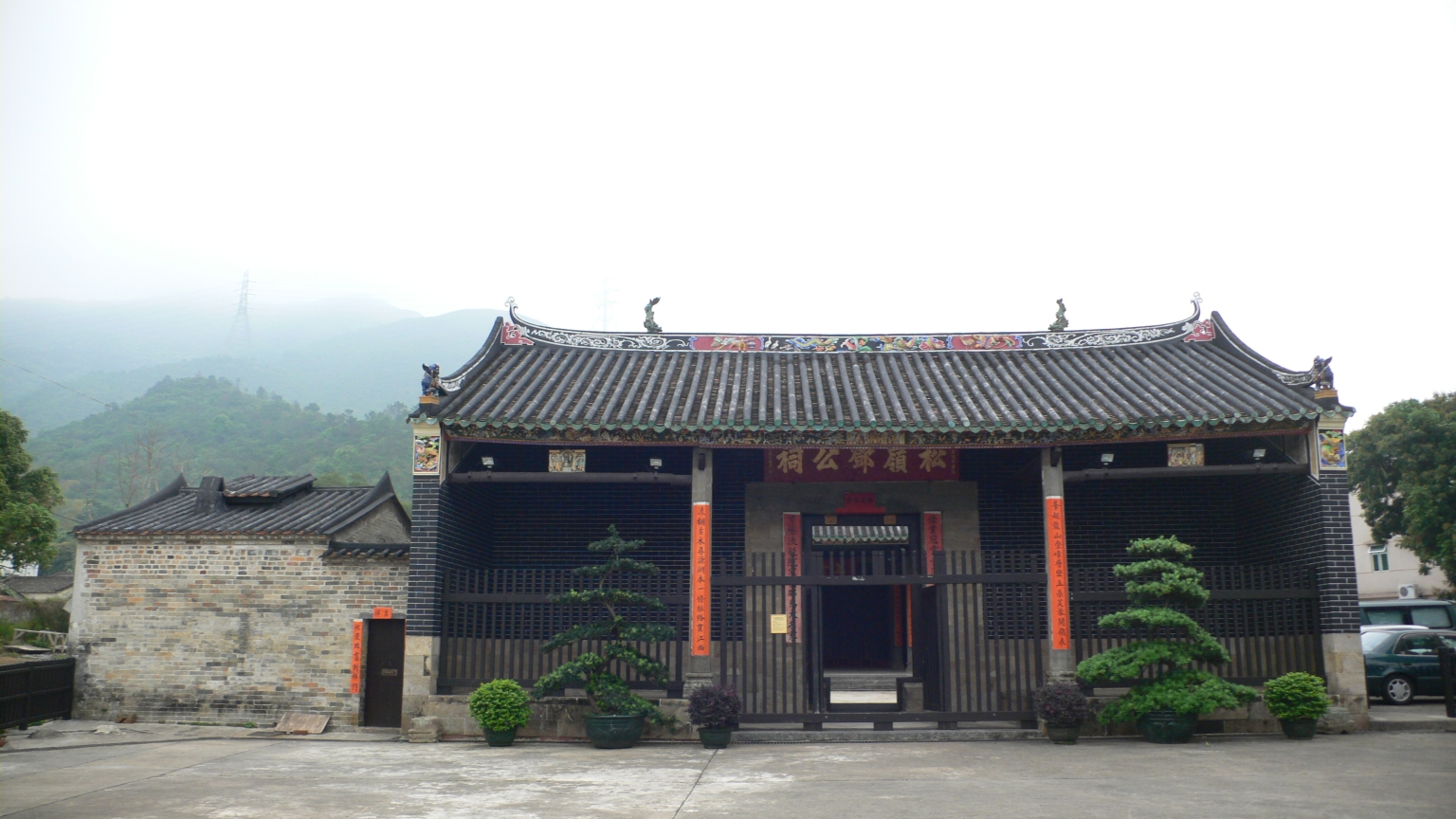
Tang Chung Ling Ancestral Hall

The Tang Chung Ling Ancestral Hall (鄧松嶺祠堂) is the main ancestral hall of the Tang Clan of Lung Yeuk Tau. It is one of the largest ancestral halls in Hong Kong, it was built in the early 16th century in memory of the founding ancestor, Tang Chung Ling (鄧松嶺) (1303–1387), the sixth generation descendant of the clan. It is situated on a site in between Lo Wai and Tsz Tong Tsuen. It is a three-hall building with the "dong chung" placed at the central hall.

The rear hall is divided into three chambers. The central chamber houses the soul tablets of the ancestors of the clan including the soul tablets of the Song princess and her husband Wai-Kap whose posthumous title was Fu Ma (Chinese: 附馬) Tang Wai-Kap (husband of a princess). Their soul tablets were elaborately carved with dragon head, which distinguished them from the others. The chamber to the left is dedicated to the ancestors who had made significant contributions to the clan or those who achieved high ranks in the imperial court. The chamber to the right, on the other hand, is for the righteous members of the clan, one of whom is Tang Si-meng, a brave servant who saved the life of his master. In the late 16th century, he was kidnapped with his master. Claiming to be the son of his master, he volunteered to be detained by the kidnappers in exchange for the release of his master to raise ransom. After the departure of his master, he jumped into the sea and sacrificed himself. He was awarded the posthumous title of "Loyal Servant" and worshiped in this hall.

The whole building is decorated with fine wood carvings, polychrome plaster mouldings, and murals of auspicious motifs. Tang Chung Ling Ancestral Hall was declared a monument in November 1997.

== Significant members ==
- Tang Fu-Hip (鄧符栛)
  - Successfully passed the Imperial Examination, awarded the highest level Jinshi (進士) degree in the Xining era (1068–1077)
  - Status: 陽春縣行政官 - Magistrate of Yeung Chun county
- Tang Yeun-Leung (鄧元亮; Dang6 Yun4 Leung6)
  - Great-grandson of Tang Fu-Hip
  - Status: 虔州北江西駐軍司令員 - Garrison commander of the northern Jiangnanxidao town of Qianzhou (虔州)
- William Tang (fashion designer)

== See also ==
- Punti
- Kat Hing Wai
- Walled villages of Hong Kong
- Ping Shan and Ping Shan Heritage Trail
- Tsui Sing Lau Pagoda
- Emperor Gaozong of Song
- Tang Ancestral Hall (Ha Tsuen)
- Tang Ancestral Hall (Ping Shan)
