= Lung Yeuk Tau =

Area northeast of Luen Wo Hui in Fanling, New Territories, Hong Kong

- Traditional Chinese: 龍躍頭
- Simplified Chinese: 龙跃头
Transcriptions
Standard Mandarin
- Hanyu Pinyin: Lóngyuètóu
Yue: Cantonese
- Yale Romanization: lùhng yeuhk tàuh
- Jyutping: lung4joek3tau4

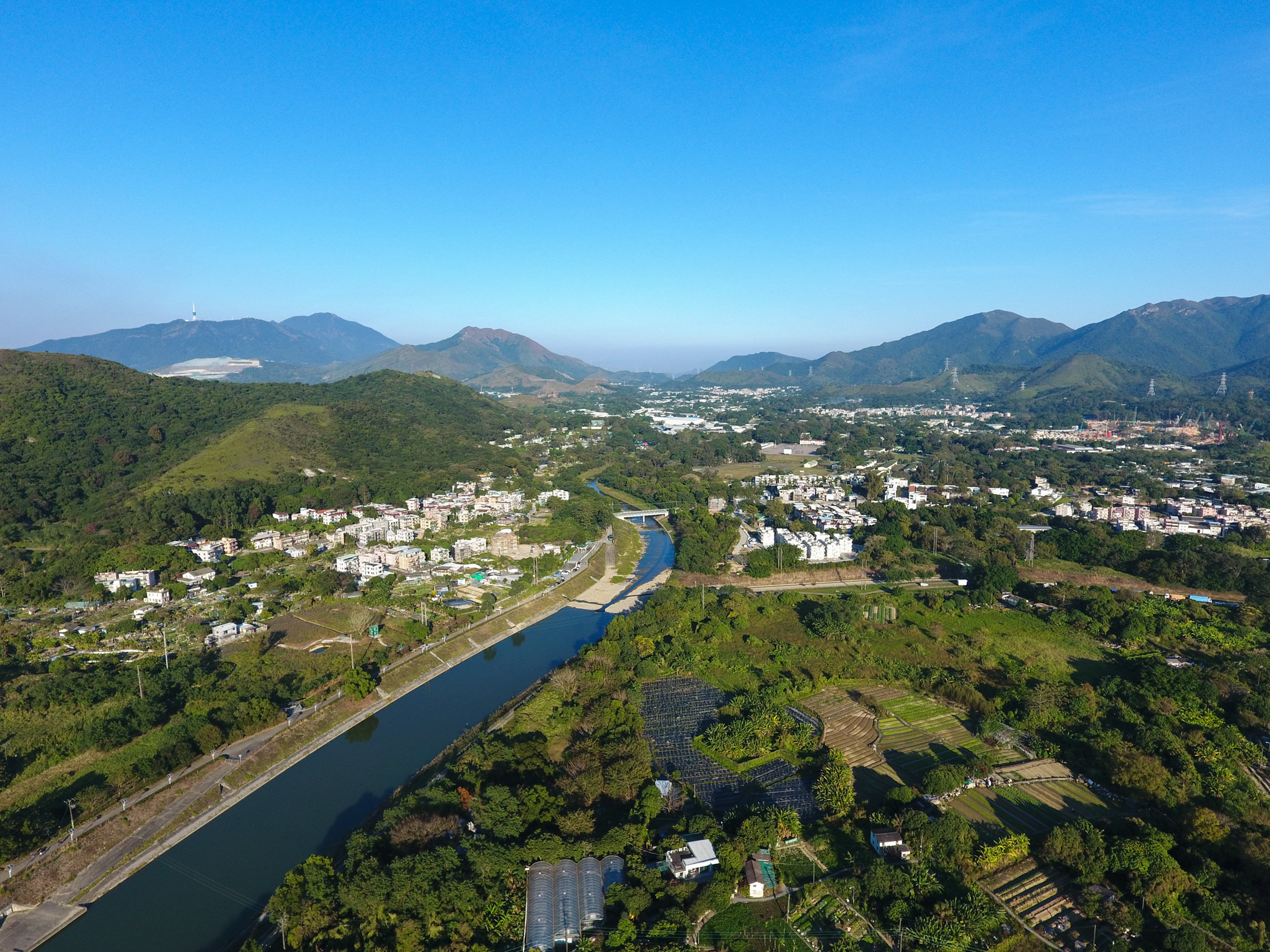
View of Lung Yeuk Tau and the Ng Tung River

Lung Yeuk Tau (Chinese: 龍躍頭; lit. 'Mountain of Jumping Dragon'), commonly known as Lung Ku Tau (龍骨頭; 'Dragon bones') and also called Lung Ling (龍嶺; 'Dragon peak') is an area located northeast of Luen Wo Hui in Fanling, New Territories, Hong Kong.

== Administration ==
For electoral purposes, Lung Yeuk Tau is part of the Queen's Hill constituency of the North District Council. It is currently represented by Law Ting-tak, who was elected in the local elections.

Lung Yeuk Tau (including San Uk Tsuen, San Wai, Wing Ning Tsuen, Wing Ning Wai, Ma Wat Tsuen, Tung Kok Wai and Lo Wai) forms collectively a recognized village under the New Territories Small House Policy.

== Villages ==
Lung Yeuk Tau is home to the Five Wais (walled villages) and Six Tsuens (villages) (五圍六村) of the Tang Clan.
The "Five Wais" (五圍) are:

- Lo Wai (老圍)
- Ma Wat Wai (麻笏圍)
- San Wai (新圍), also called Kun Lung Wai (覲龍圍)
- Tung Kok Wai (東閣圍), also known as Ling Kok Wai (嶺角圍)
- Wing Ning Wai (永寧圍)

The "Six Tsuen" (六村) are:

- Kun Lung Tsuen (覲龍村)
- Ma Wat Tsuen (麻笏村)
- San Uk Tsuen (新屋村)
- Siu Hang Tsuen (小坑村)
- Tsz Tong Tsuen (祠堂村)
- Wing Ning Tsuen (永寧村), also called Tai Tang (大廳)

== History ==
Lung Yeuk Tau was served by the Lung Yeuk Tau station of the former Sha Tau Kok Railway, which was in operation from 1911 to 1928. Lung Yeuk Tau station was opened on 21 December 1911.

== Heritage Trail ==
The area is home to several declared monuments and walled villages. The Lung Yeuk Tau Heritage Trail has been established to promote and facilitate the visit of some of the historical places of the area. Places along the Heritage Trail include:

| Name | Photographs | Notes | Coordinates/References |
|---|---|---|---|
| Siu Hang Tsuen (小坑村) | | | 22.50951°N 114.14721°E |
| San Wai (新圍) aka. Kun Lung Wai (覲龍圍) | | A walled village. Kun Lung Gate Tower and the Enclosing Walls and Corner Watch Towers of Kun Lung Wai are declared monuments | 22.507121°N 114.14842°E |
| Sin Shut Study Hall (善述書室), in San Uk Tsuen (新屋村) | | Grade I historic building | 22.50448°N 114.14862°E |
| Wing Ning Wai (永寧圍) | | A walled village. | 22.501585°N 114.150191°E |
| Wing Ning Tsuen (永寧村) | | | 22.50103°N 114.1508°E |
| Tung Kok Wai (東閣圍) aka. Ling Kok Wai (嶺角圍) | | A walled village. It is listed as a Grade I historic building of Hong Kong. | 22.500589°N 114.153543°E |
| Tang Chung Ling Ancestral Hall (松嶺鄧公祠) | | Declared monument | 22.497837°N 114.152737°E |
| Tin Hau Kung (天后宮) | | Tin Hau Temple. A declared monument. It is located next to the Tang Chung Ling Ancestral Hall. | 22.497503°N 114.152691°E |
| Lo Wai (老圍) | | A walled village. The Entrance Tower and Enclosing Walls of Lo Wai are declared monuments | 22.497808°N 114.151892°E |
| Ma Wat Wai (麻笏圍) | | A walled village. The Entrance Tower of Ma Wat Wai is a declared monument | 22.499027°N 114.149998°E |
| Shek Lo (石廬) | | Grade I historic building | 22.497397°N 114.149608°E |
| Tsung Kyam Church (崇謙堂) | | Grade III historic building. Located at No. 20 Shung Him Tong Tsuen. | 22.49699°N 114.14889°E |
| Stone tablets to ward off evil spirits (擋煞碑石) | | | |
| Shrines of the Earth God | | | |

== See also ==
- Heritage trails in Hong Kong
- Ping Shan Heritage Trail, in Yuen Long District
- Fan Leng Lau
