= Shung Him Tong Tsuen =

Village in Fanling, North District, Hong Kong

Coordinates: 22.49684°N 114.1488°E

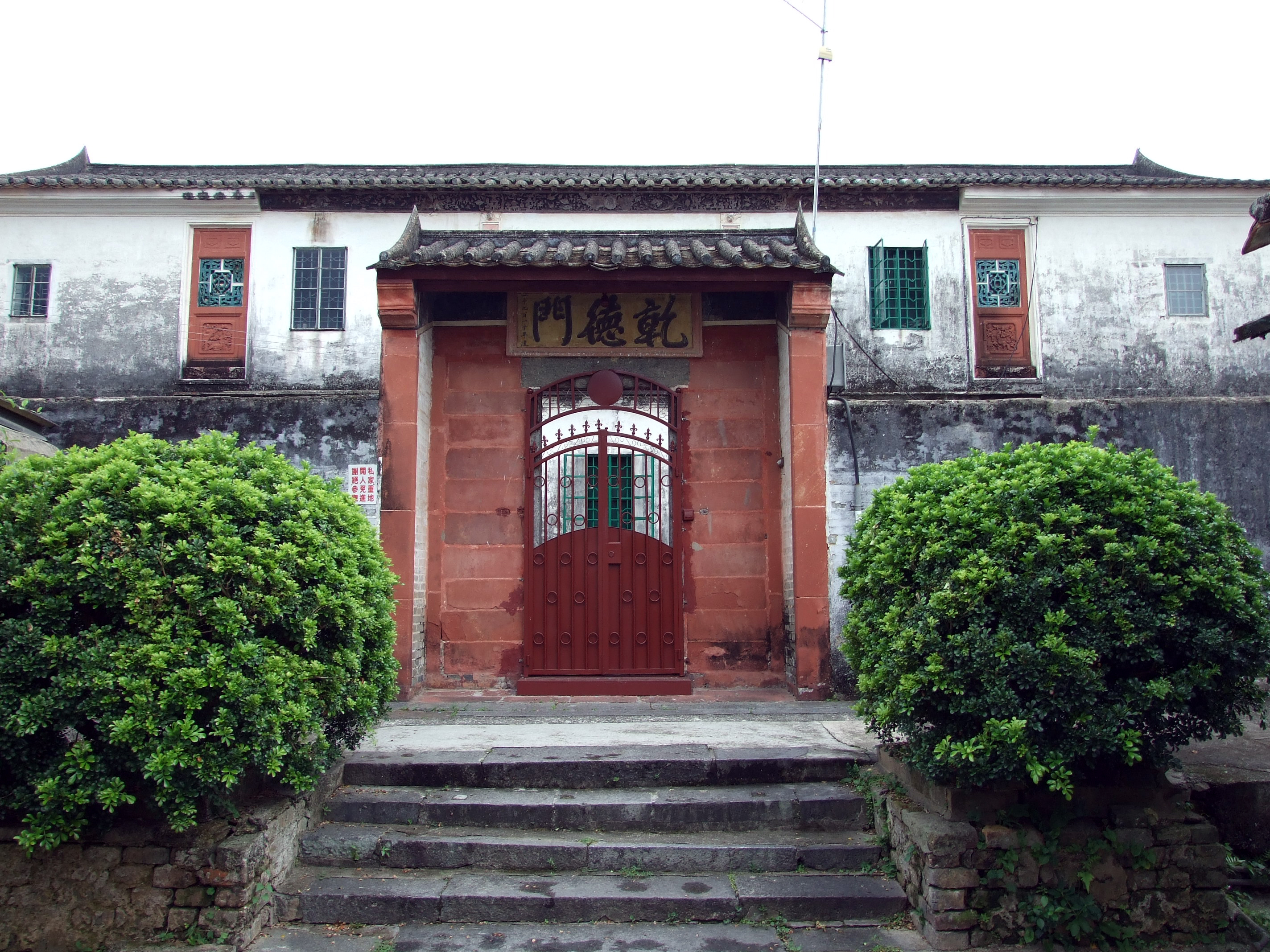
Kin Tak Lau in Shung Him Tong Tsuen

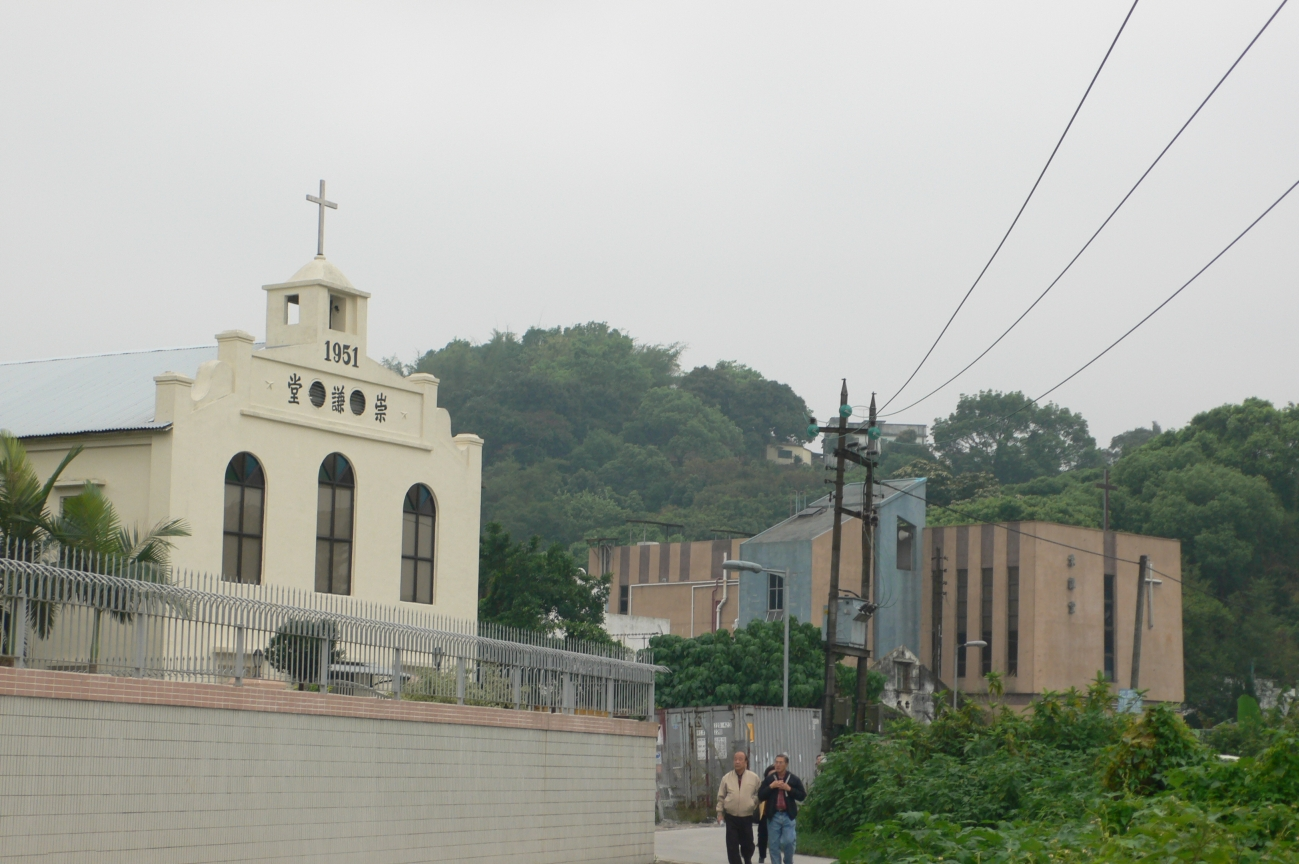
Old and New Tsung Kyam Churches in Shung Him Tong Tsuen

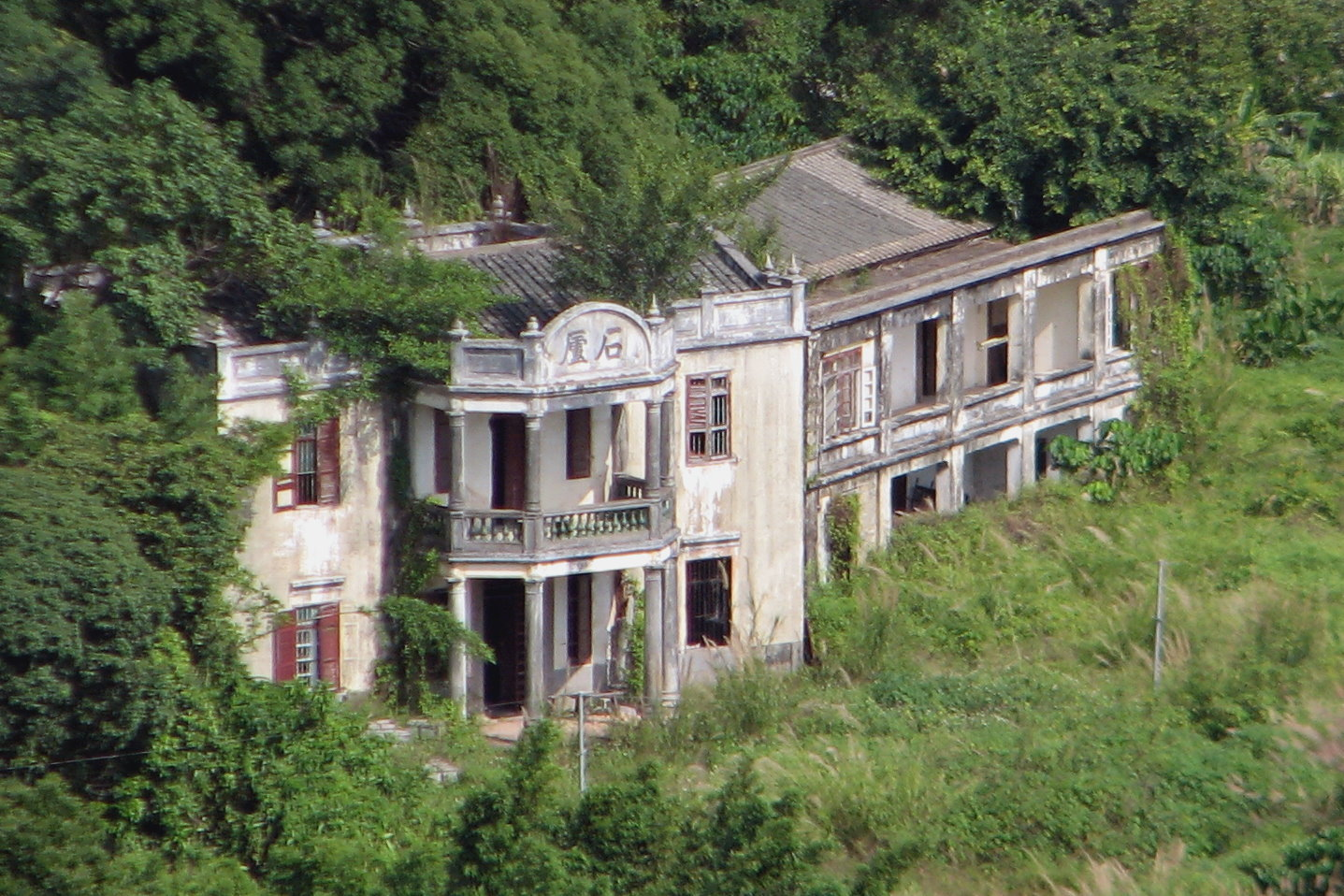
Shek Lo in Shung Him Tong Tsuen

Shung Him Tong Tsuen (Chinese: 崇謙堂村) is a village in the Lung Yeuk Tau area of Fanling, North District, Hong Kong.

== Administration ==
Shung Him Tong is a recognized village under the New Territories Small House Policy. It is one of the villages represented within the Fanling District Rural Committee. For electoral purposes, Shung Him Tong Tsuen is part of the Queen's Hill constituency, which is currently represented by Law Ting-tak.

== Features ==
- Kin Tak Lau, Nos. 15-16 Shung Him Tong Tsuen, Grade I historic building
- Shek Lo, Grade I historic building
- Tsung Kyam Church, No. 20 Shung Him Tong Tsuen, Grade III historic building
