= Wing Ning Wai =

Walled village in Lung Yeuk Tau, Fanling, Hong Kong

Coordinates: 22.50164°N 114.15007°E

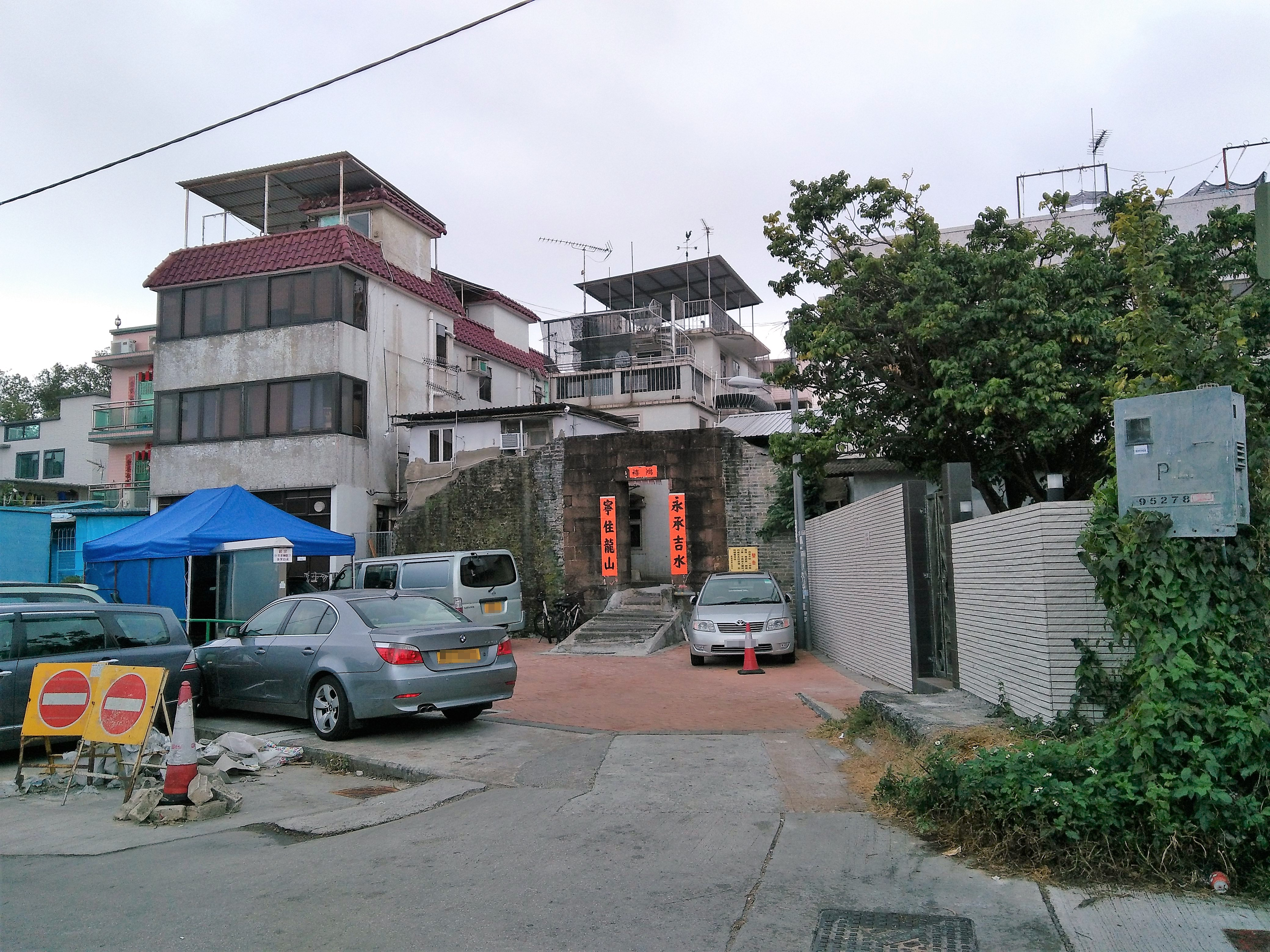
Outside view of Wing Ning Wai.

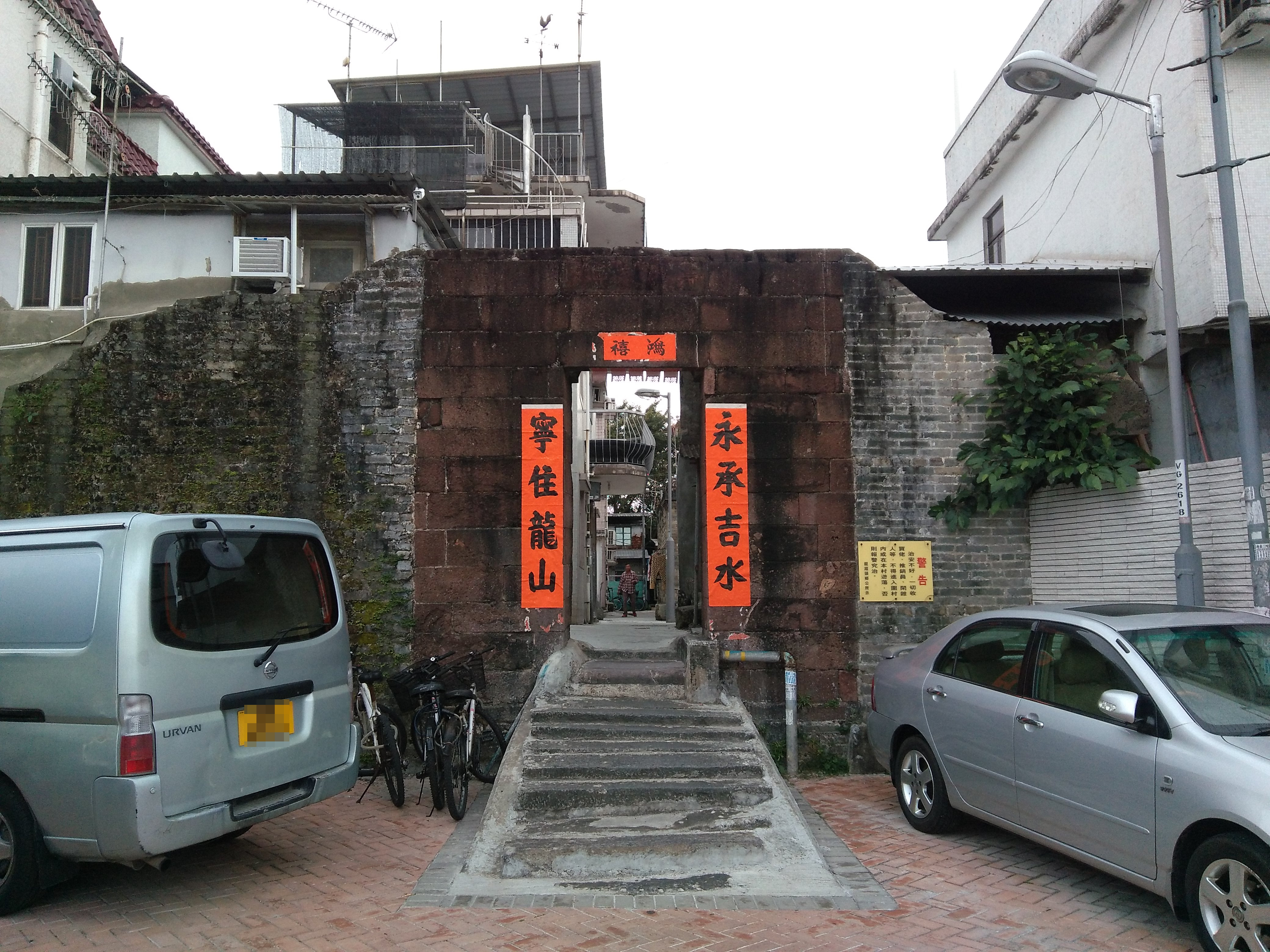
Entrance gate of Wing Ning Wai.

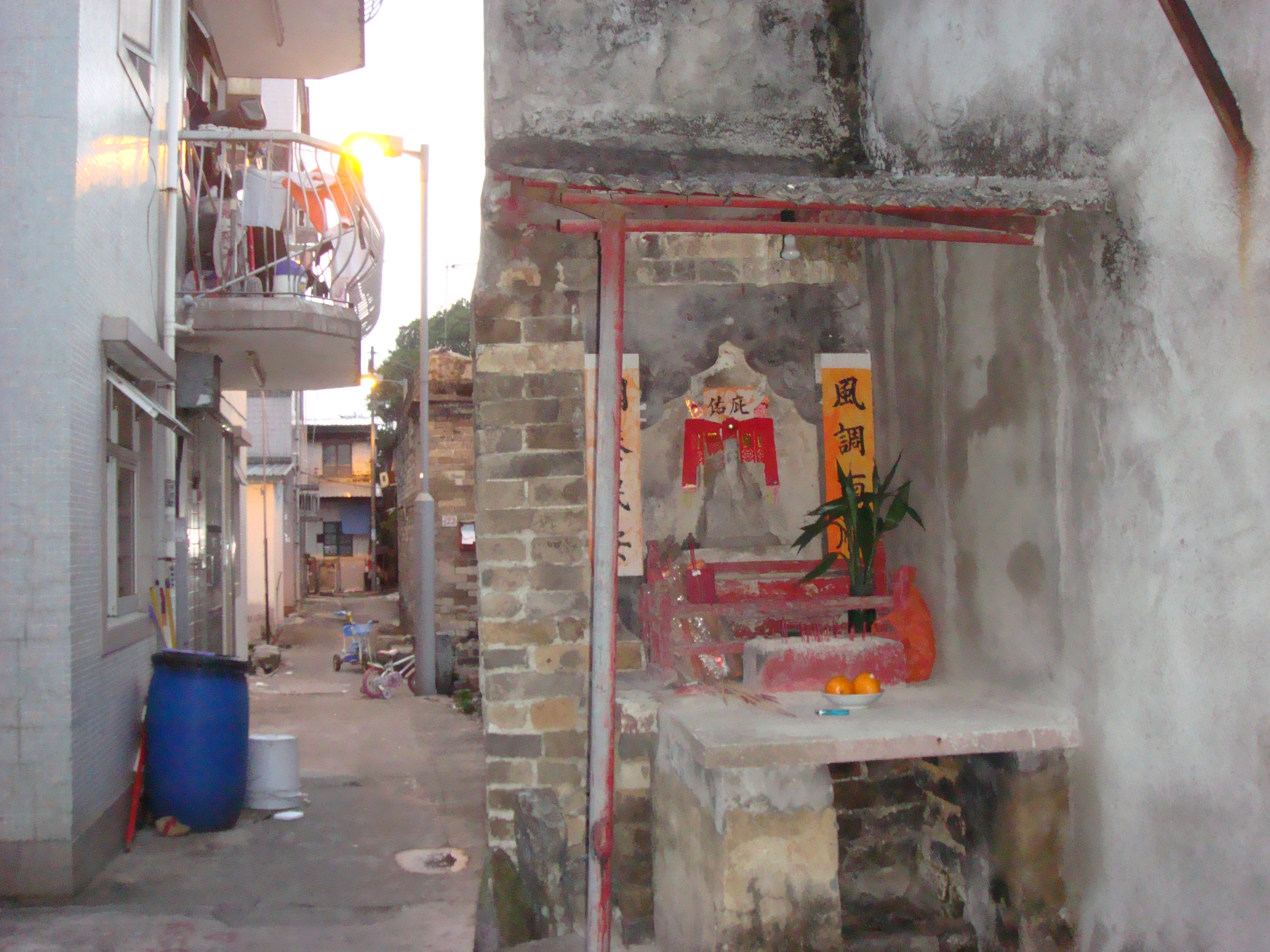
Earth God shrine inside Wing Ning Wai, near the entrance gate.

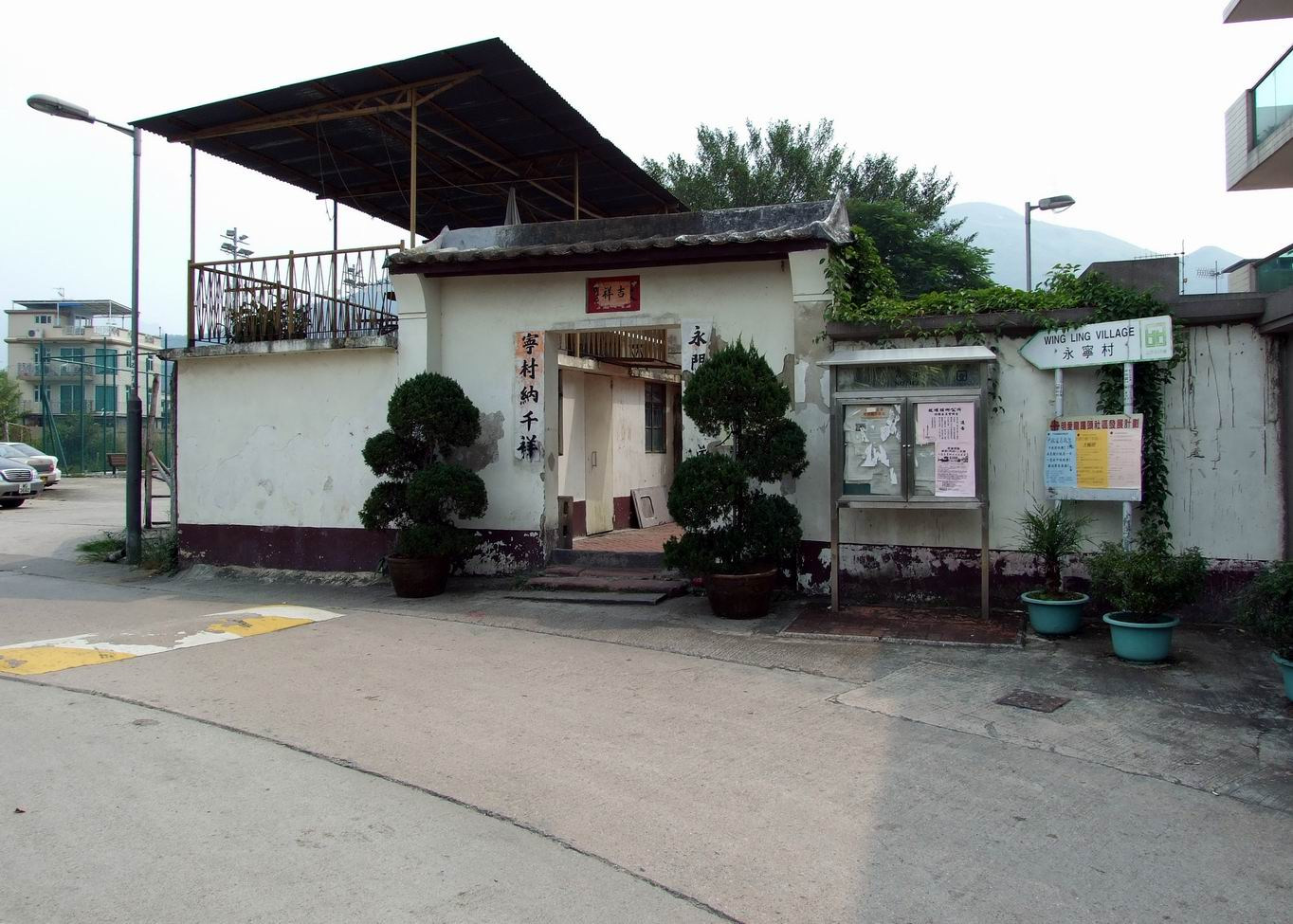
Entrance gate of Wing Ning Tsuen in 2007.

Wing Ning Wai (Chinese: 永寧圍) is a walled village in Lung Yeuk Tau, Fanling, Hong Kong. It is one of the Five Wai (walled villages) and Six Tsuen (villages) in Lung Yeuk Tau.

== Administration ==
Wing Ning Wai, as part of Lung Yeuk Tau, is a recognized village under the New Territories Small House Policy. Wing Ning Wai is one of the villages represented within the Fanling District Rural Committee. For electoral purposes, Wing Ning Wai is part of the Queen's Hill constituency, which is currently represented by Law Ting-tak.

== History ==
Wing Ning Wai is said to have a history dating back 400 to 500 years. It historically comprised three rows of houses enclosed within a rectangular protective wall, with an entrance gate in the north-east front wall and four watchtowers at its four corners. While the entrance gate, built in 1744, is still extant, the watchtowers and most of the enclosing walls have been demolished. Some of the watchtowers had new buildings constructed on them. The altar situated at the end of the main alley has disappeared.

== Wing Ning Tsuen ==
Wing Ning Tsuen (永寧村), also known as Tai Tang (大廳), is a branch of Wing Ning Wai, and is located to its southeast. The village, which is about 300 years old, is one of the Six Tsuen (villages) in Lung Yeuk Tau.

== Conservation ==
Wing Ning Wai and Wing Ning Tsuen are located along the Lung Yeuk Tau Heritage Trail. The entrance gate of Wing Ning Wai has been listed as a Grade III historic building.

== See also ==
- Walled villages of Hong Kong
- Tang Clan
