= Tsz Tong Tsuen (North District) =

Coordinates: 22.497848°N 114.153652°E

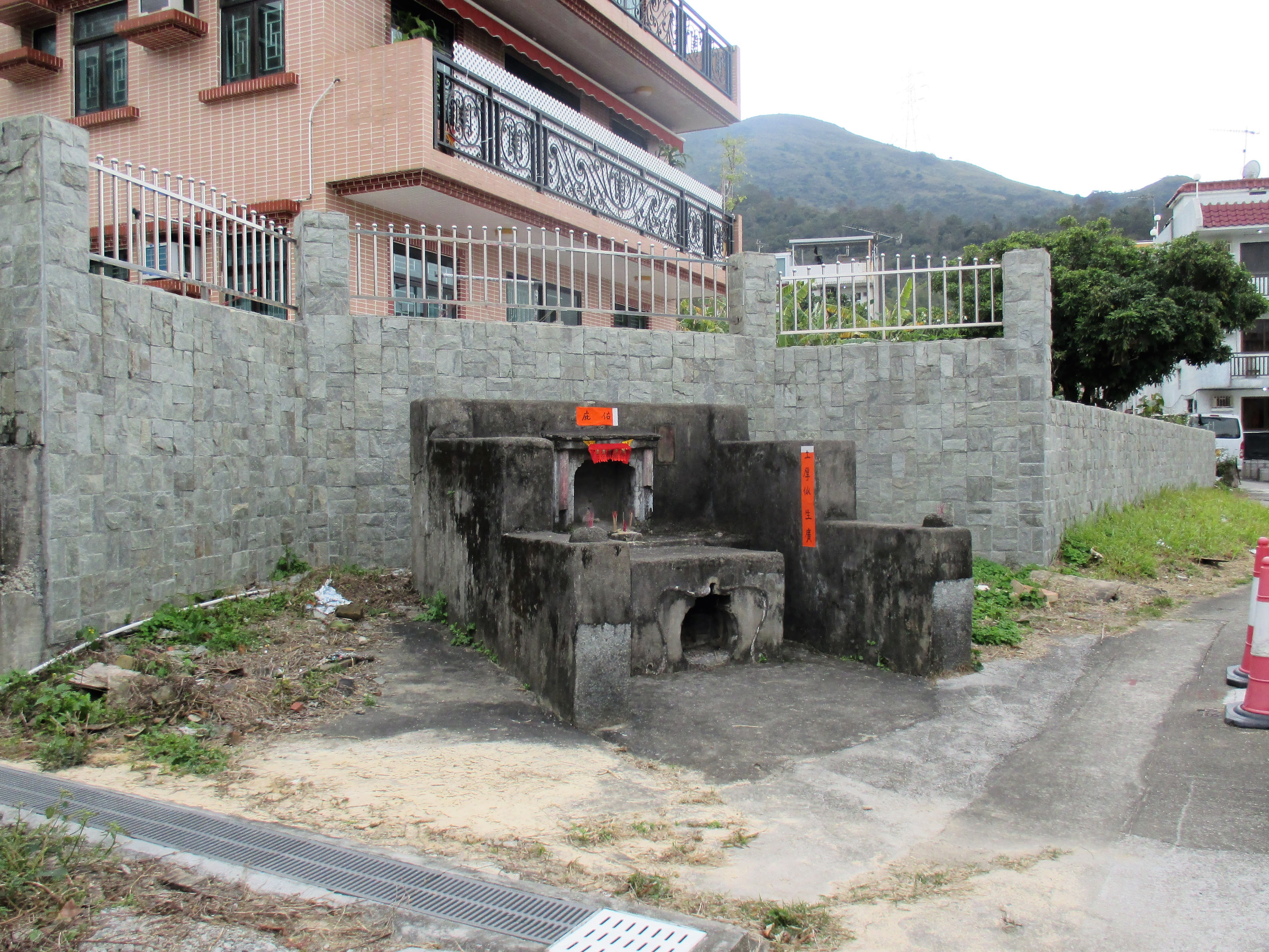
Earth God shrine in Tsz Tong Tsuen.

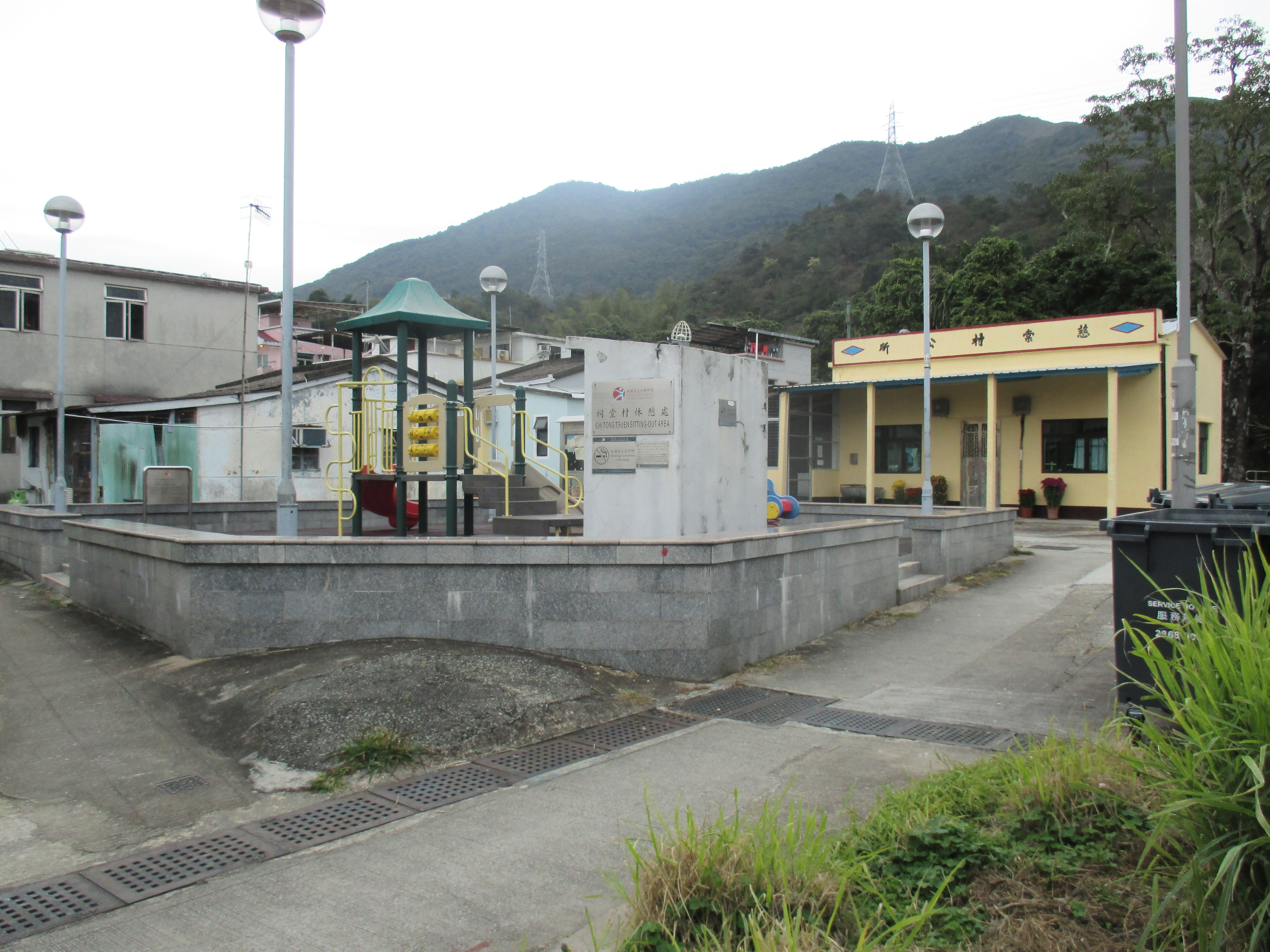
Children playground and Tsz Tong Tsuen Village Office (慈堂村村公所) (right).

Tsz Tong Tsuen (Chinese: 祠堂村) is a village of Hong Kong, located in Lung Yeuk Tau, Fanling, North District. It is one of the Five Wai (walled villages) and Six Tsuen (villages) in Lung Yeuk Tau.

== Administration ==
Tsz Tong Tsuen is a recognized village under the New Territories Small House Policy. It is one of the villages represented within the Fanling District Rural Committee. For electoral purposes, Tsz Tong Tsuen is part of the Queen's Hill constituency, which is currently represented by Law Ting-tak.

== History ==
Tsz Tong Tsuen was founded in the early 14th century by a member of the Tang Clan lineage of Kam Tin.

== See also ==
- Tang Chung Ling Ancestral Hall, located between Tsz Tong Tsuen and Lo Wai.
