= Siu Hang Tsuen =

Siu Hang Tsuen (Chinese: 小坑村) is the name of two villages in Hong Kong:

- Siu Hang Tsuen (North District), in Lung Yeuk Tau, Fanling, North District
- Siu Hang Tsuen (Tuen Mun District), in Tuen Mun District
