= Tung Kok Wai =

Walled village in Lung Yeuk Tau, Fanling, Hong Kong

Coordinates: 22.50041°N 114.15349°E

- Traditional Chinese: 東閣圍
- Cantonese Yale: dūng gok wàih
Transcriptions
Yue: Cantonese
- Yale Romanization: dūng gok wàih
- Jyutping: dung1 gok3 wai4

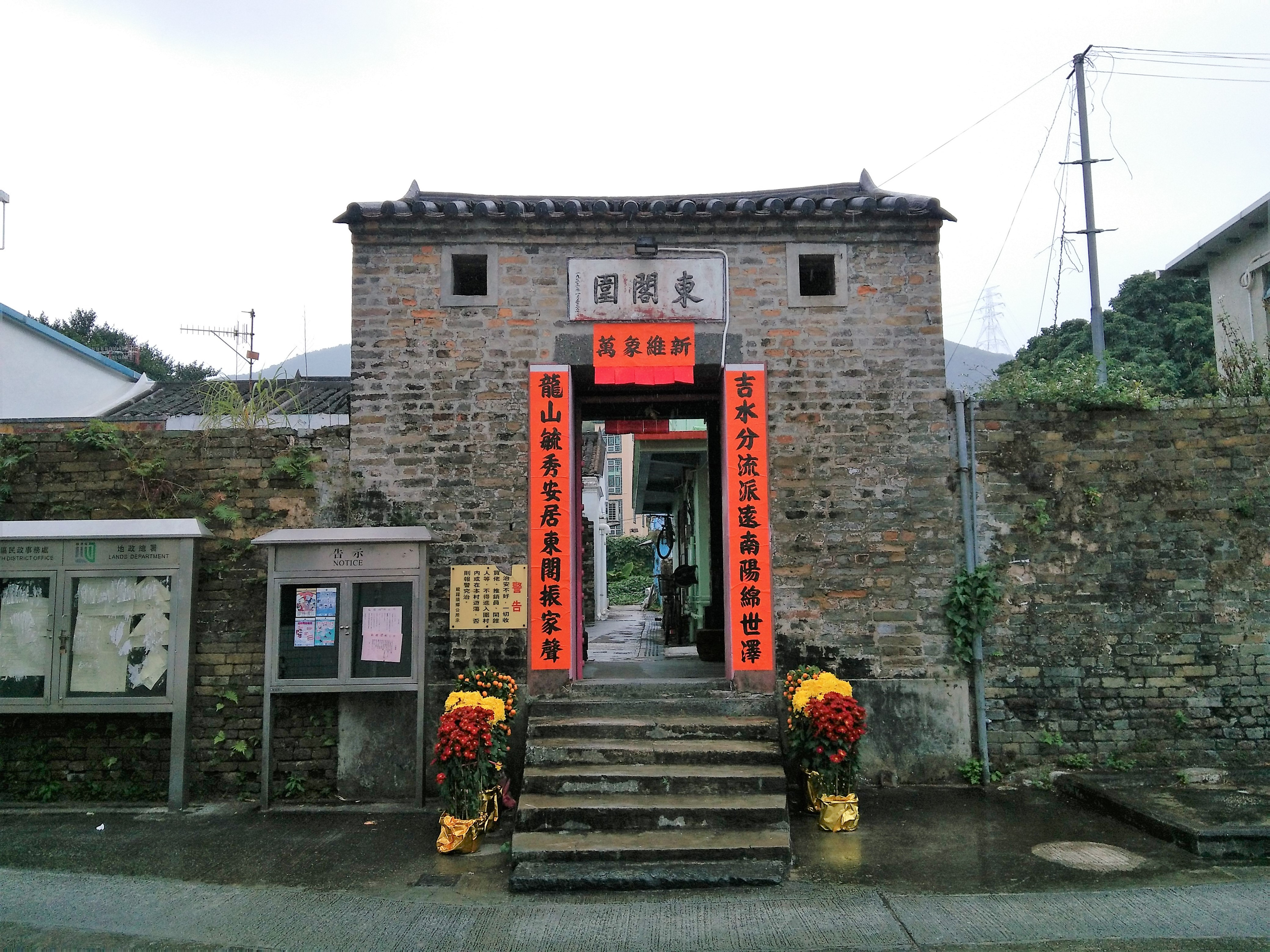
Entrance gate of Tung Kok Wai.

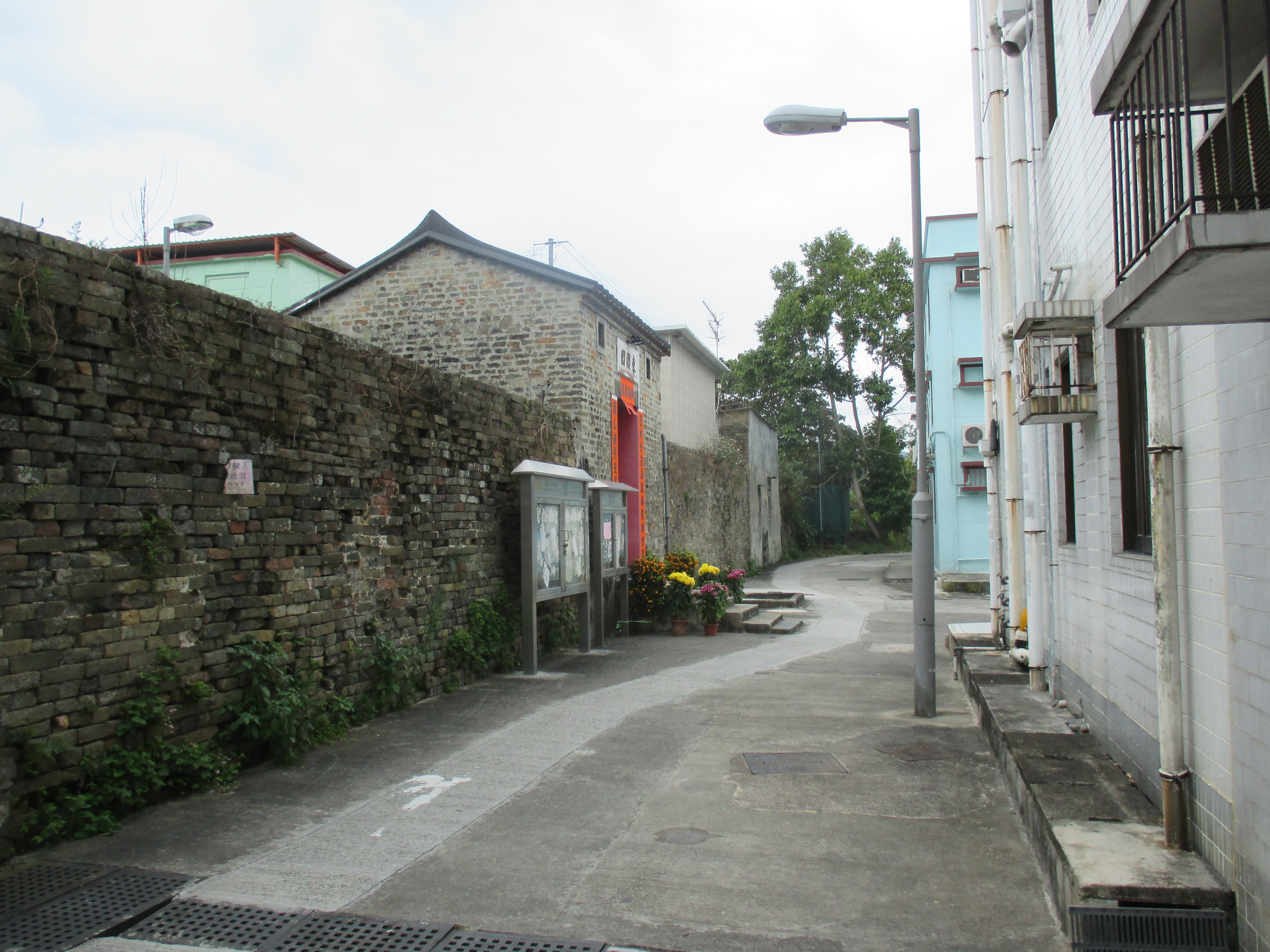
Wall and entrance gate of Tung Kok Wai.

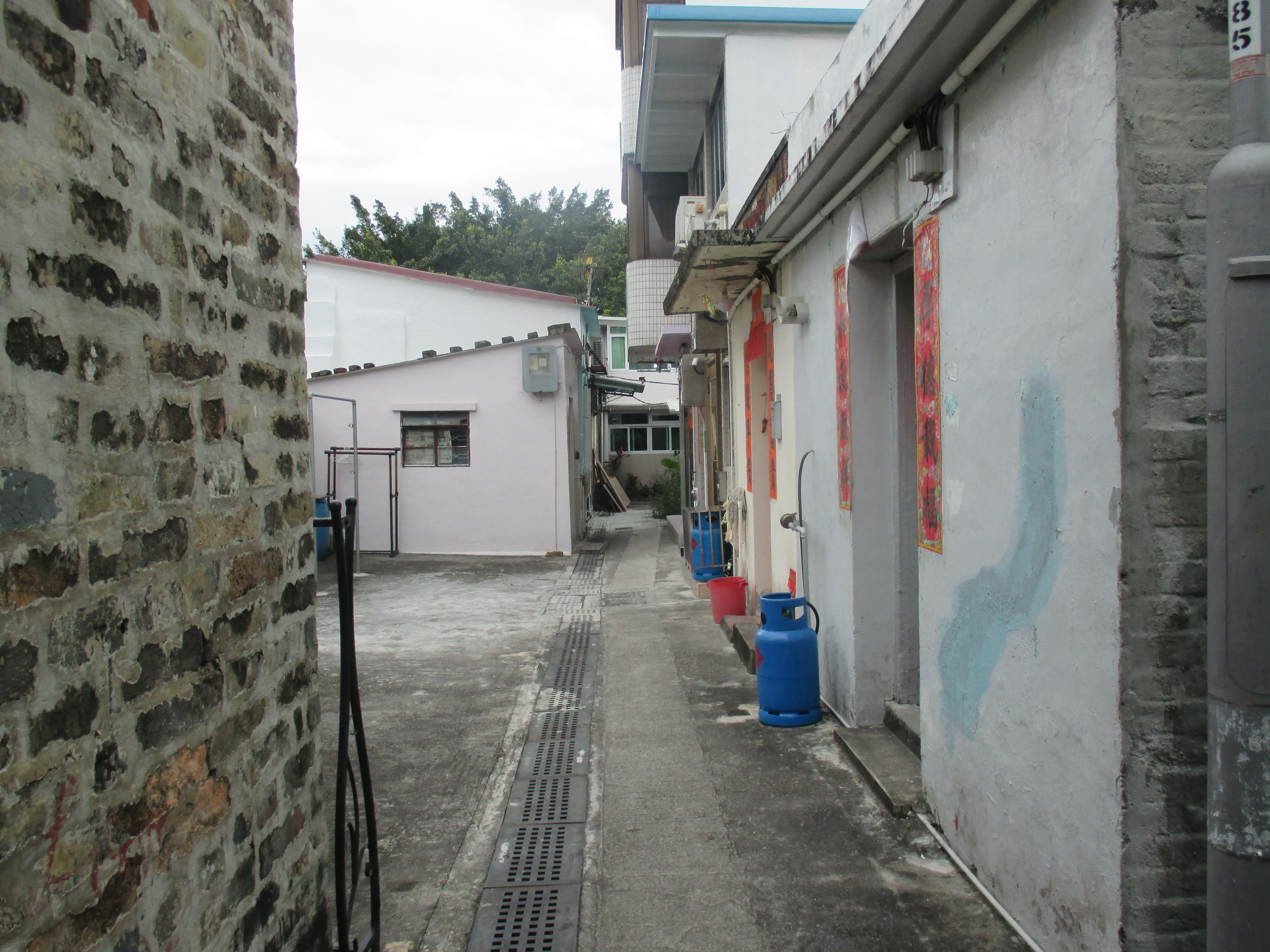
Inside Tung Kok Wai.

Tung Kok Wai (Chinese: 東閣圍), also known as Ling Kok Wai (嶺角圍), is a walled village in Lung Yeuk Tau, Fanling, Hong Kong. It is one of the Five Wai (walled villages) and Six Tsuen (villages) in Lung Yeuk Tau.

== Administration ==
Tung Kok Wai is one of the villages represented within the Fanling District Rural Committee. For electoral purposes, Tung Kok Wai is part of the Queen's Hill constituency, which is currently represented by Law Ting-tak.

Tung Kok Wai, as part of Lung Yeuk Tau, is a recognized village under the New Territories Small House Policy.

== Conservation ==
Tung Kok Wai is located along the Lung Yeuk Tau Heritage Trail. The walled village is listed as a Grade I historic building of Hong Kong.

== See also ==
- Walled villages of Hong Kong
