= Ma Wat Wai =

Walled village in Lung Yeuk Tau, Fanling, Hong Kong

Coordinates: 22.49879°N 114.15013°E

- Traditional Chinese: 麻笏圍
- Cantonese Yale: màh fāt wàih
Transcriptions
Yue: Cantonese
- Yale Romanization: màh fāt wàih
- Jyutping: maa4 fat1 wai4

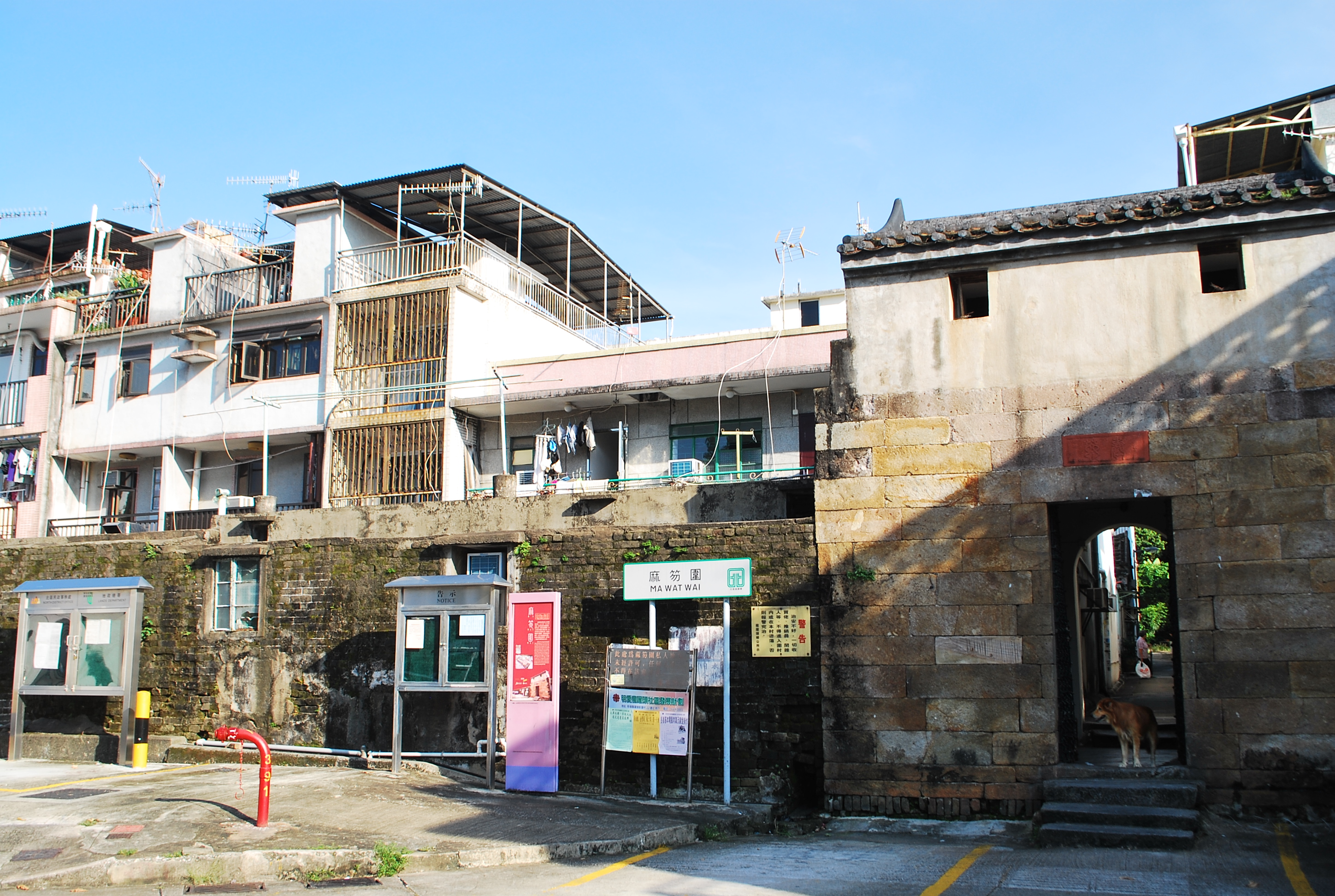
Outside view of Ma Wat Wai.

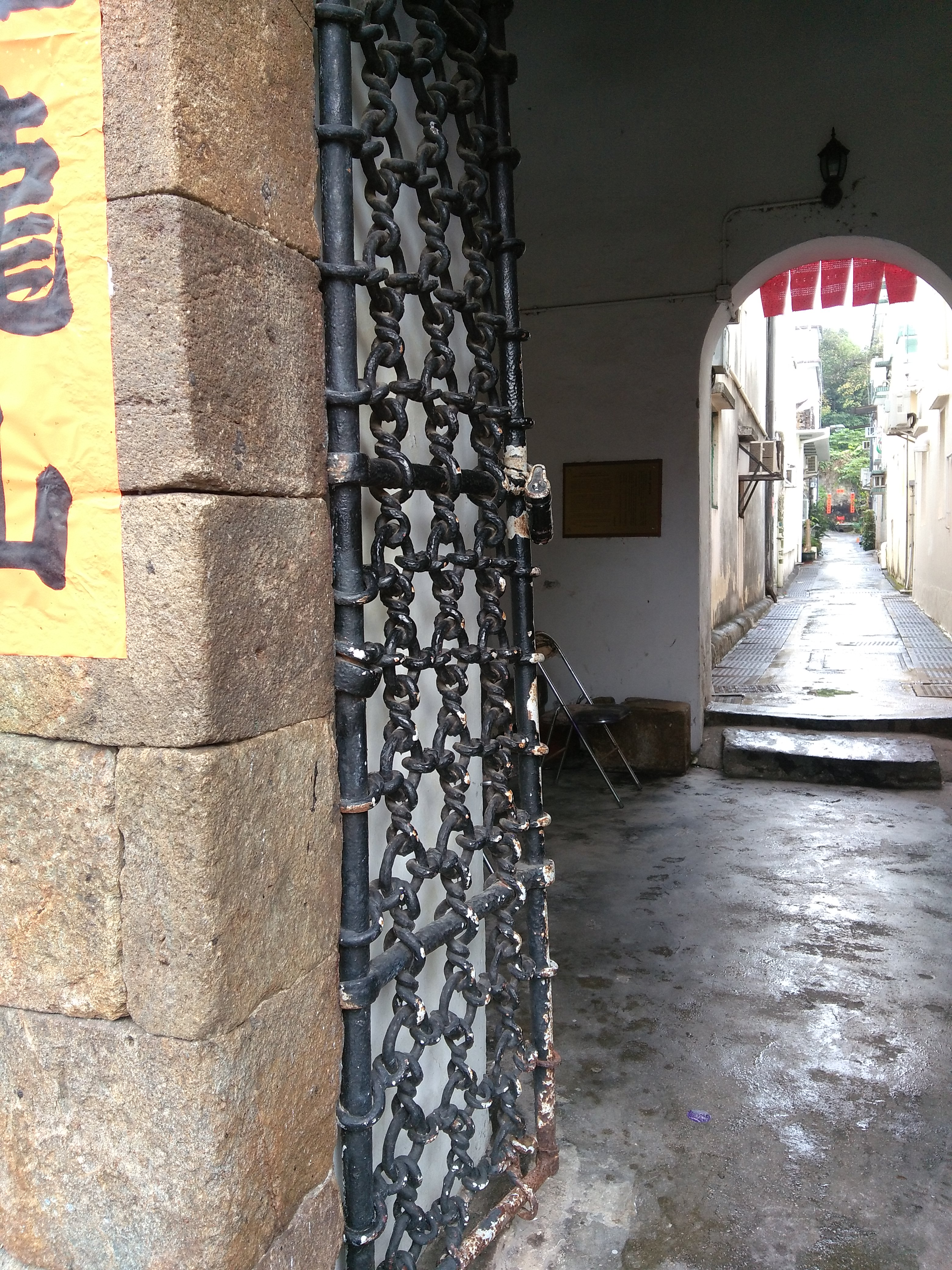
View of the central axis of Ma Wat Wai from the gate tower.

Ma Wat Wai (Chinese: 麻笏圍) is a walled village in Lung Yeuk Tau, Fanling, Hong Kong. Ma Wat Wai and the adjacent village of Ma Wat Tsuen (麻笏村) are part of the Five Wai (walled villages) and Six Tsuen (villages) in Lung Yeuk Tau.

== Administration ==
Ma Wat Wai is a recognized village under the New Territories Small House Policy. It is one of the villages represented within the Fanling District Rural Committee. For electoral purposes, Ma Wat Wai is part of the Queen's Hill constituency, which is currently represented by Law Ting-tak.

Ma Wat Tsuen, as part of Lung Yeuk Tau, is also a recognized village under the New Territories Small House Policy.

== History ==
At the time of the 1911 census, the population of Ma Wat Wai was 49. The number of males was 28.

== Conservation ==
Ma Wat Wai is located along the Lung Yeuk Tau Heritage Trail. The Entrance Tower of Ma Wat Wai is a declared monument.

== See also ==
- Walled villages of Hong Kong
