= San Wai (North District) =

Walled village in Hong Kong

Coordinates: 22.50717°N 114.14872°E

- Traditional Chinese: 新圍
Transcriptions
Yue: Cantonese
- Yale Romanization: sān wàih
- Jyutping: san1 wai4

Kun Lung Wai
- Traditional Chinese: 覲龍圍
Transcriptions
Yue: Cantonese
- Yale Romanization: gan lùhng wàih
- Jyutping: gan2 lung4 wai4

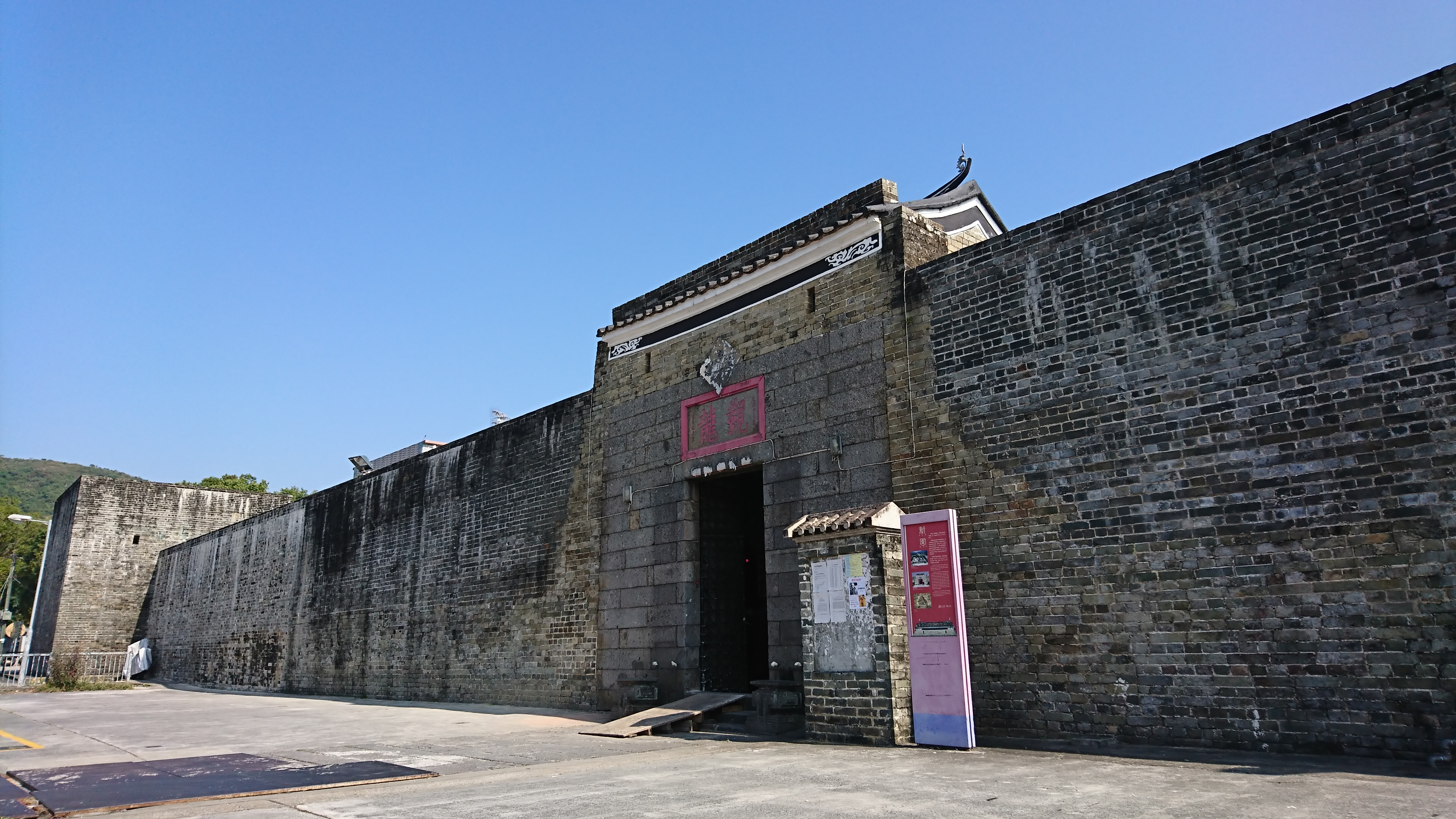
Outside view of San Wai.

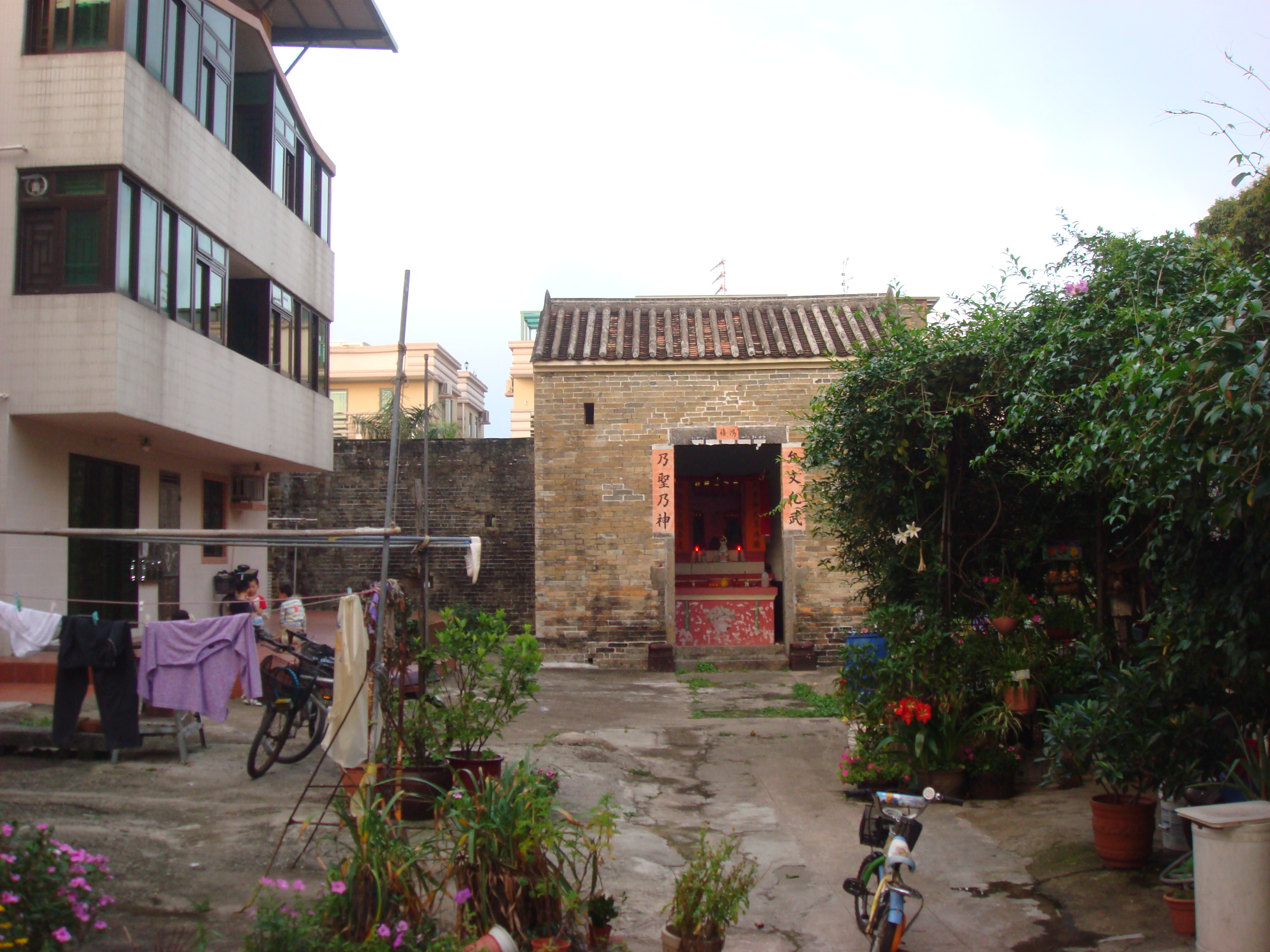
Village shrine of San Wai.

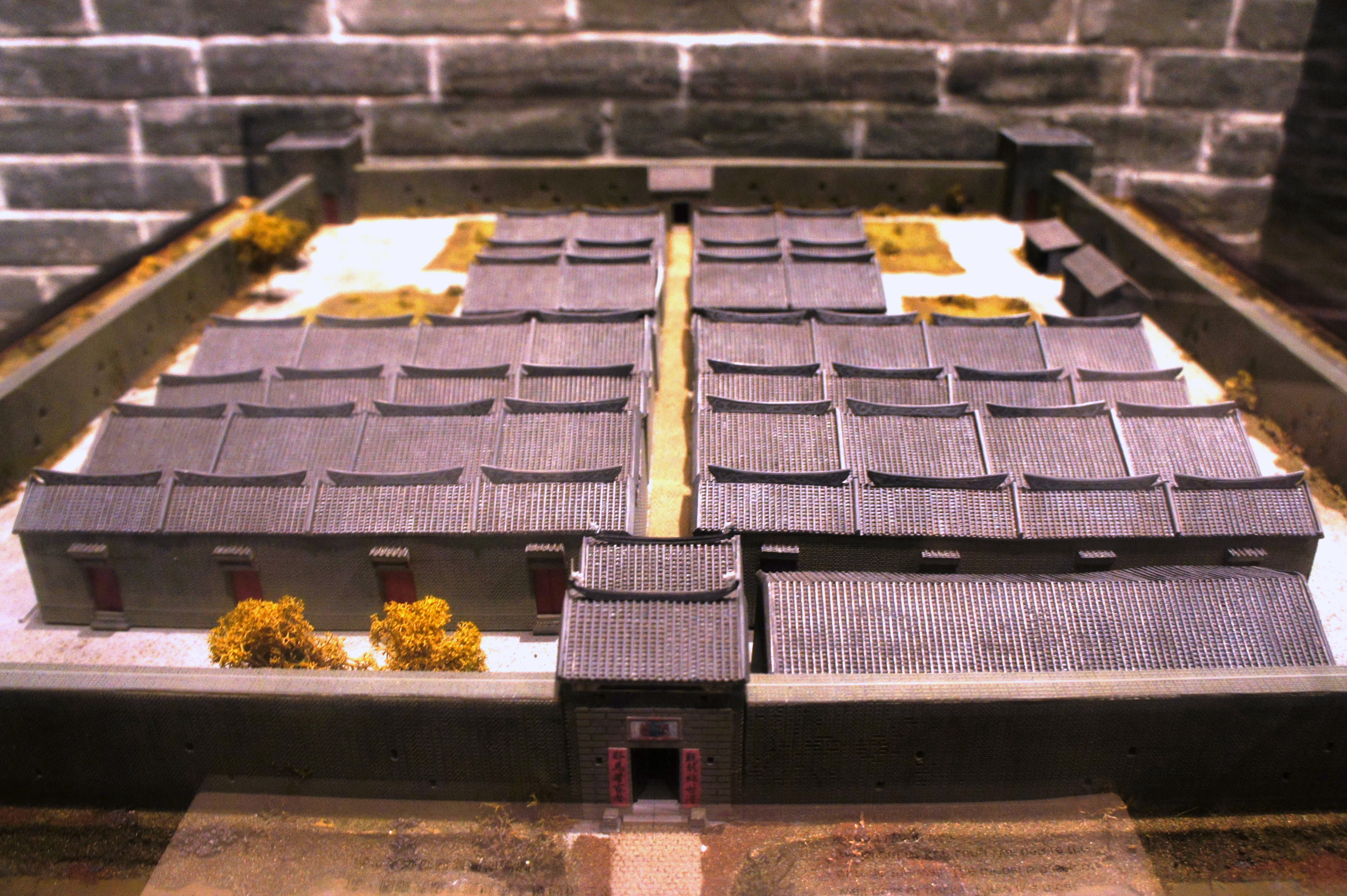
Model of Kun Lung Wai, displayed at Hong Kong Heritage Museum.

San Wai (Chinese: 新圍), also called Kun Lung Wai (覲龍圍), is a walled village in Lung Yeuk Tau, Fanling, Hong Kong. It is one of the Five Wai (walled villages) and Six Tsuen (villages) in Lung Yeuk Tau.

== Administration ==
San Wai is one of the villages represented within the Fanling District Rural Committee. For electoral purposes, San Wai is part of the Queen's Hill constituency, which is currently represented by Law Ting-tak.

San Wai, as part of Lung Yeuk Tau, is a recognized village under the New Territories Small House Policy.

== Conservation ==
San Wai is located along the Lung Yeuk Tau Heritage Trail. The gate tower of San Wai is a declared monument since 1988, while the enclosing walls and watch towers are declared monuments since 1993.

== See also ==
- Walled villages of Hong Kong
