= Lo Wai, Lung Yeuk Tau =

Walled village in Lung Yeuk Tau, Fanling, Hong Kong

Coordinates: 22.497808°N 114.151892°E

- Traditional Chinese: 老圍
Transcriptions
Yue: Cantonese
- Yale Romanization: lóuh wàih
- Jyutping: lou5 wai4

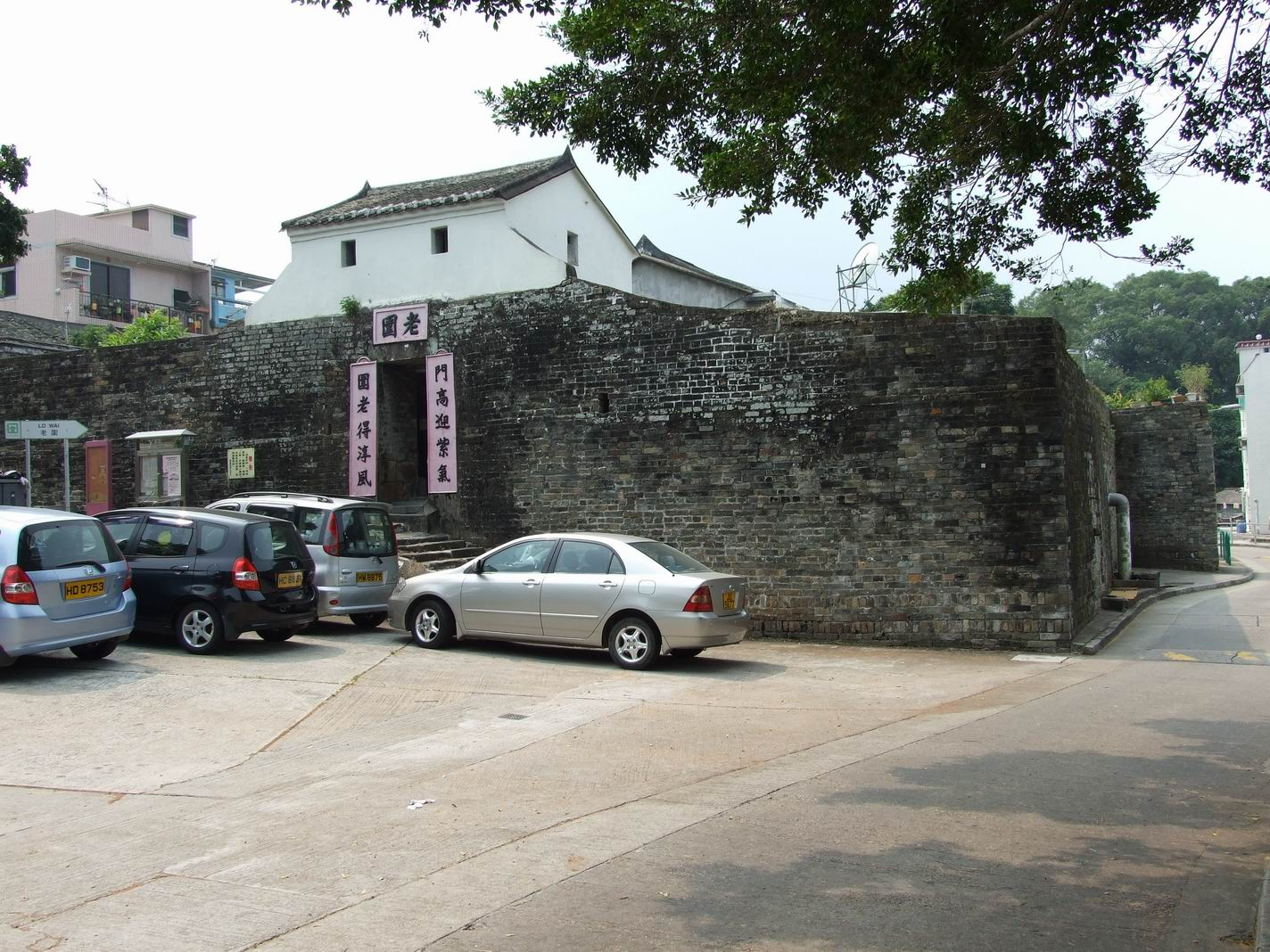
Outside view of Lo Wai.

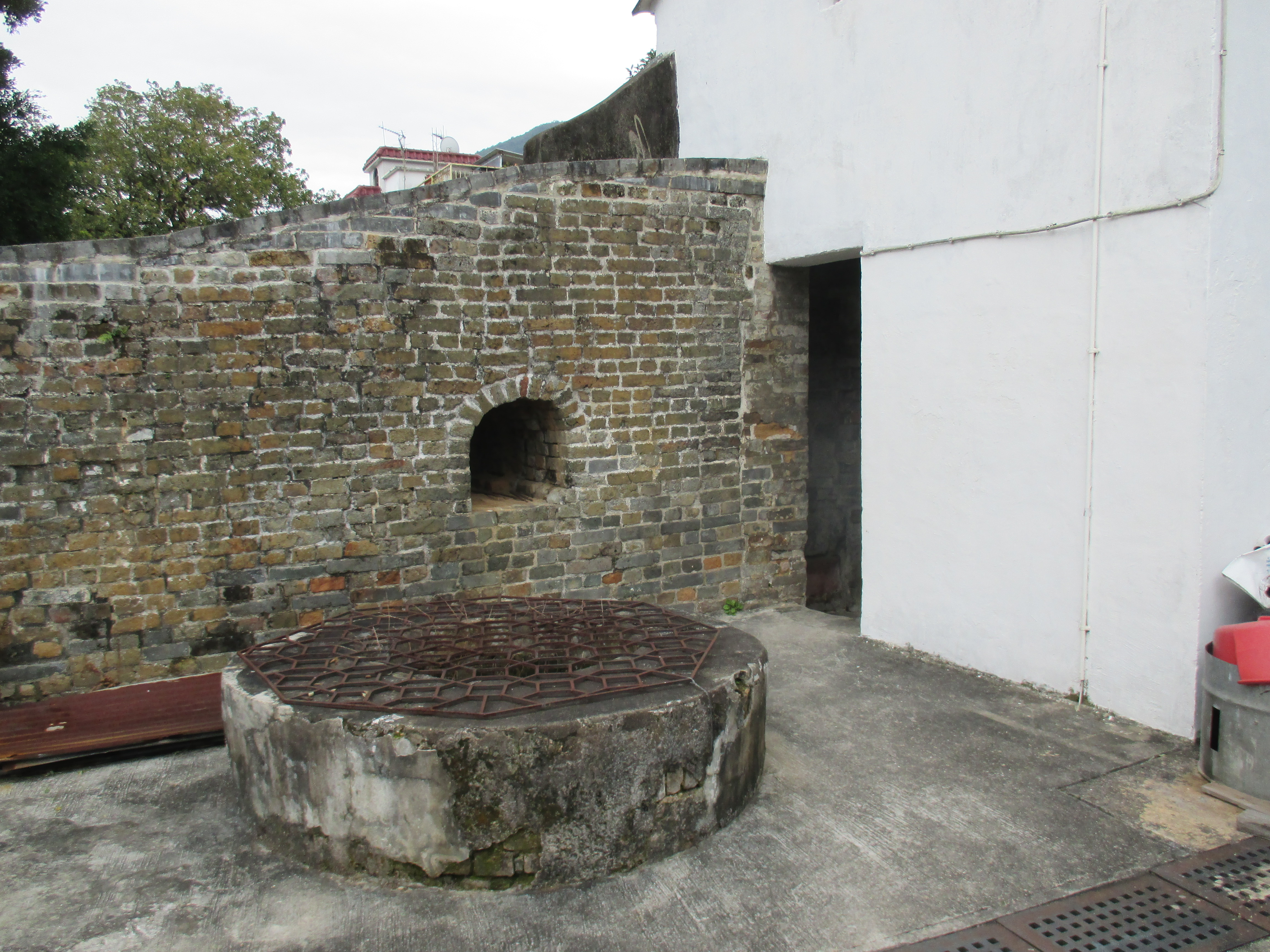
Inside Lo Wai. Water well next to the entrance tower of the village.

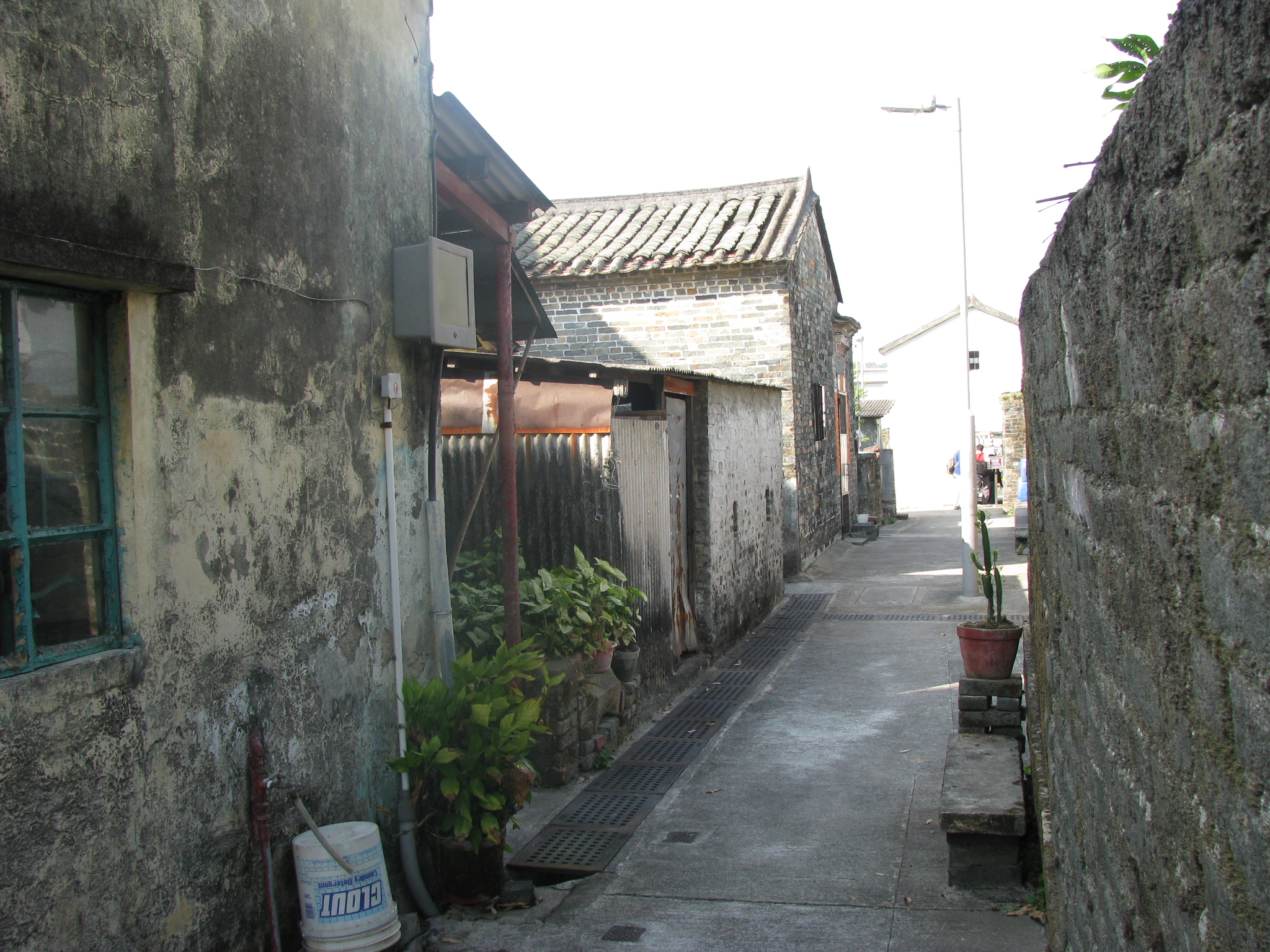
Inside Lo Wai. The white building in the background is the entrance tower of the village.

Lo Wai (Chinese: 老圍) is a walled village in Lung Yeuk Tau, Fanling, Hong Kong. It is one of the Five Wai (walled villages) and Six Tsuen (villages) in Lung Yeuk Tau.

== Administration ==
Lo Wai is one of the villages represented within the Fanling District Rural Committee. For electoral purposes, Lo Wai is part of the Queen's Hill constituency, which is currently represented by Law Ting-tak.

Lo Wai, as part of Lung Yeuk Tau, is a recognized village under the New Territories Small House Policy.

== Conservation ==
Lo Wai is located along the Lung Yeuk Tau Heritage Trail. The entrance tower and walls surrounding Lo Wai are declared monuments.

== See also ==
- Walled villages of Hong Kong
- Tang Chung Ling Ancestral Hall, located between Lo Wai and Tsz Tong Tsuen
