= Tang Chung Ling Ancestral Hall =

Coordinates: 22.497837°N 114.152737°E

- Traditional Chinese: 鄧鬆嶺祠堂
Transcriptions
Yue: Cantonese
- Yale Romanization: Dahng sūng líhng chìh tóng
- Jyutping: Dang6 sung1 ling5 ci4 tong2

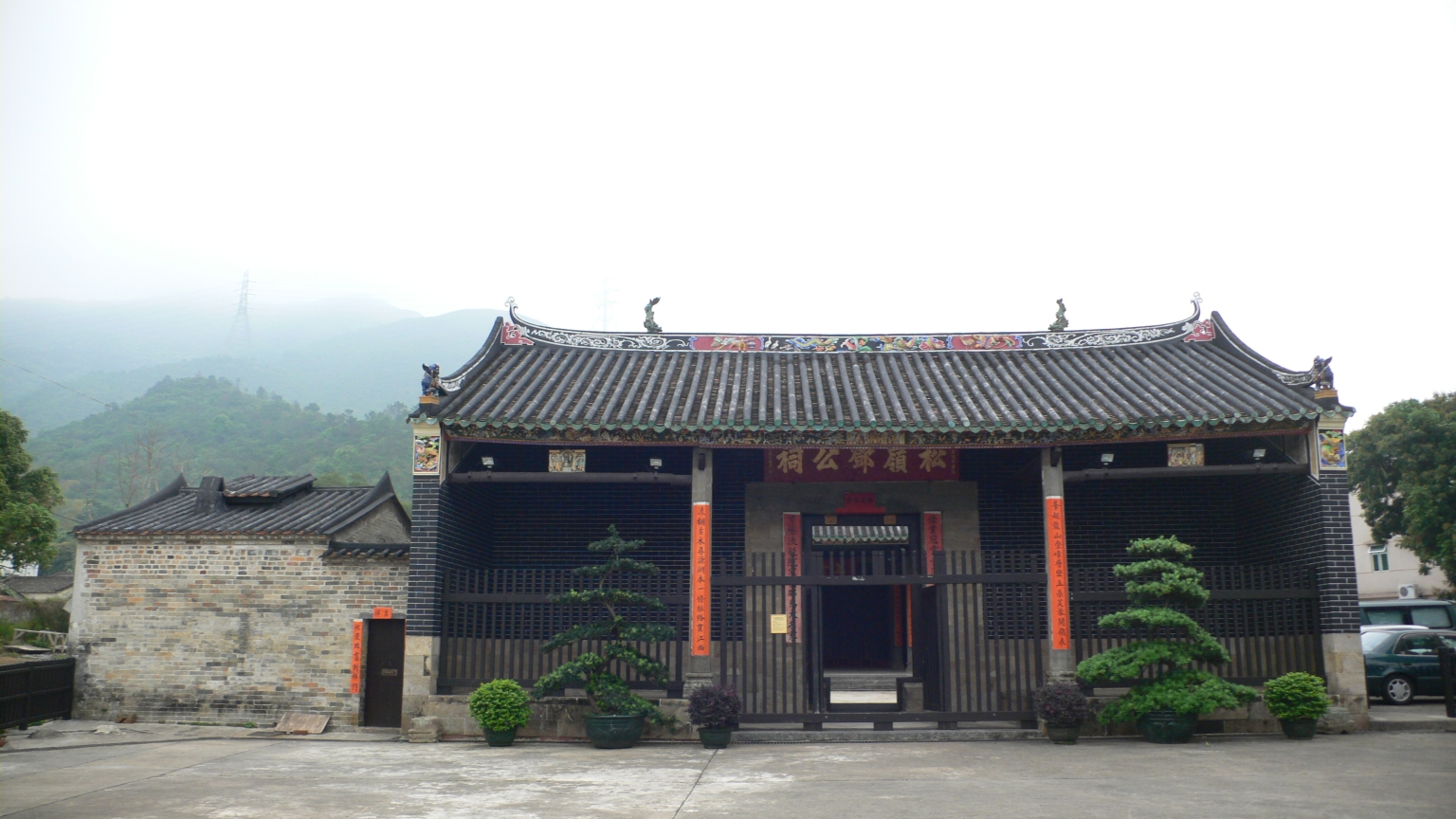
Tang Chung Ling Ancestral Hall. Front view. The lower building on the left is housing a kitchen.

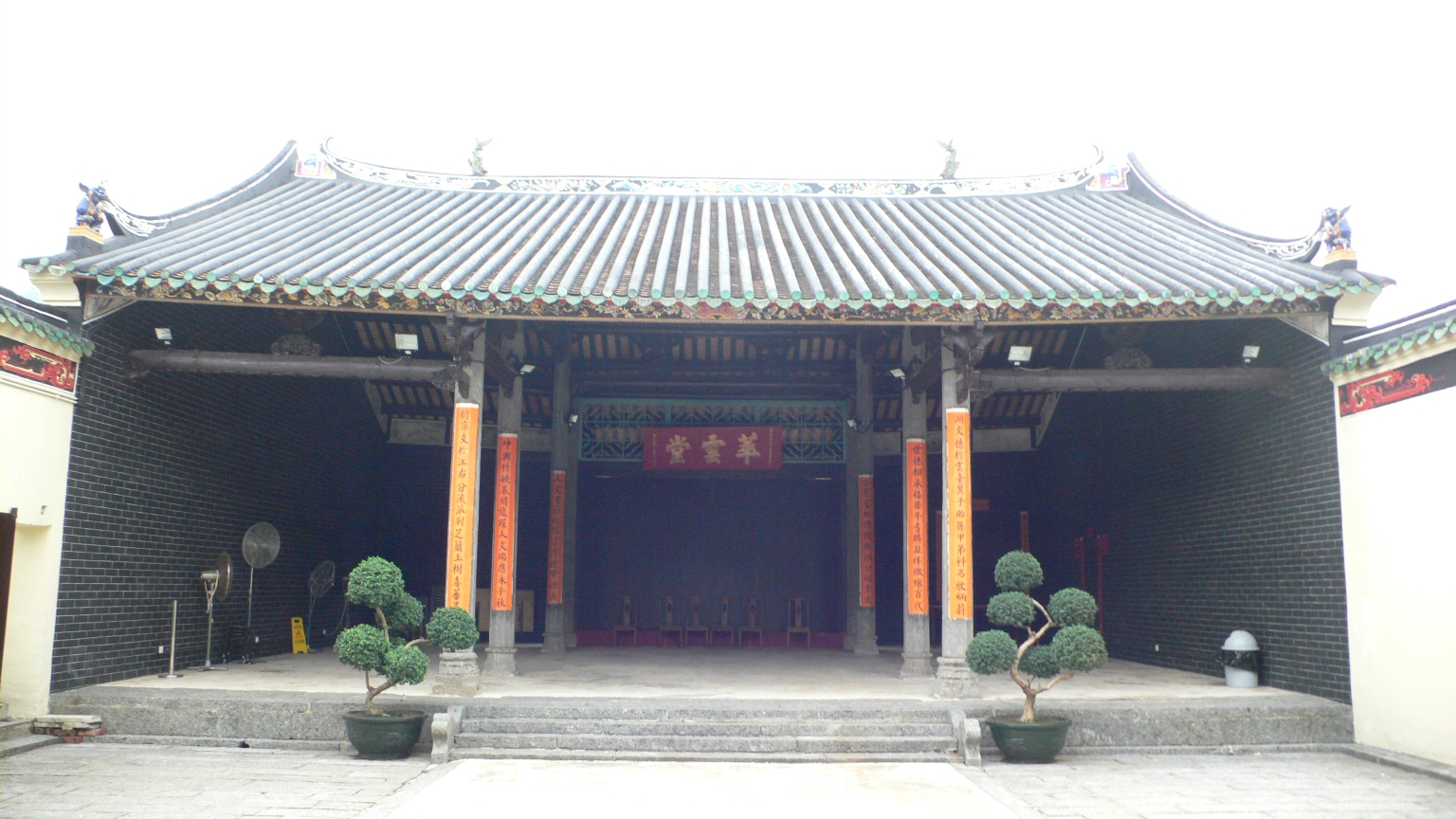
Interior of Tang Chung Ling Ancestral Hall.

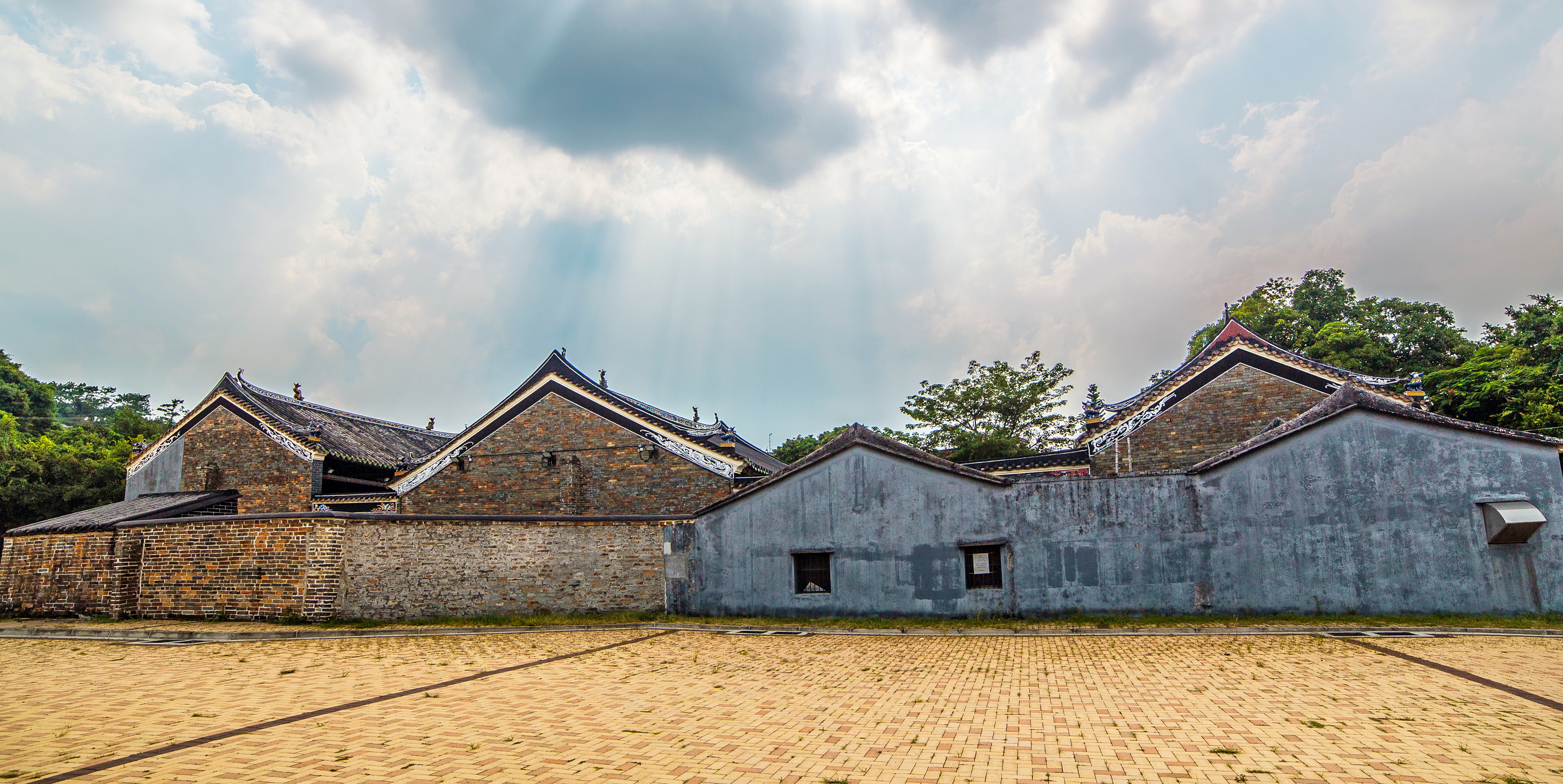
Tang Chung Ling Ancestral Hall. Side view.

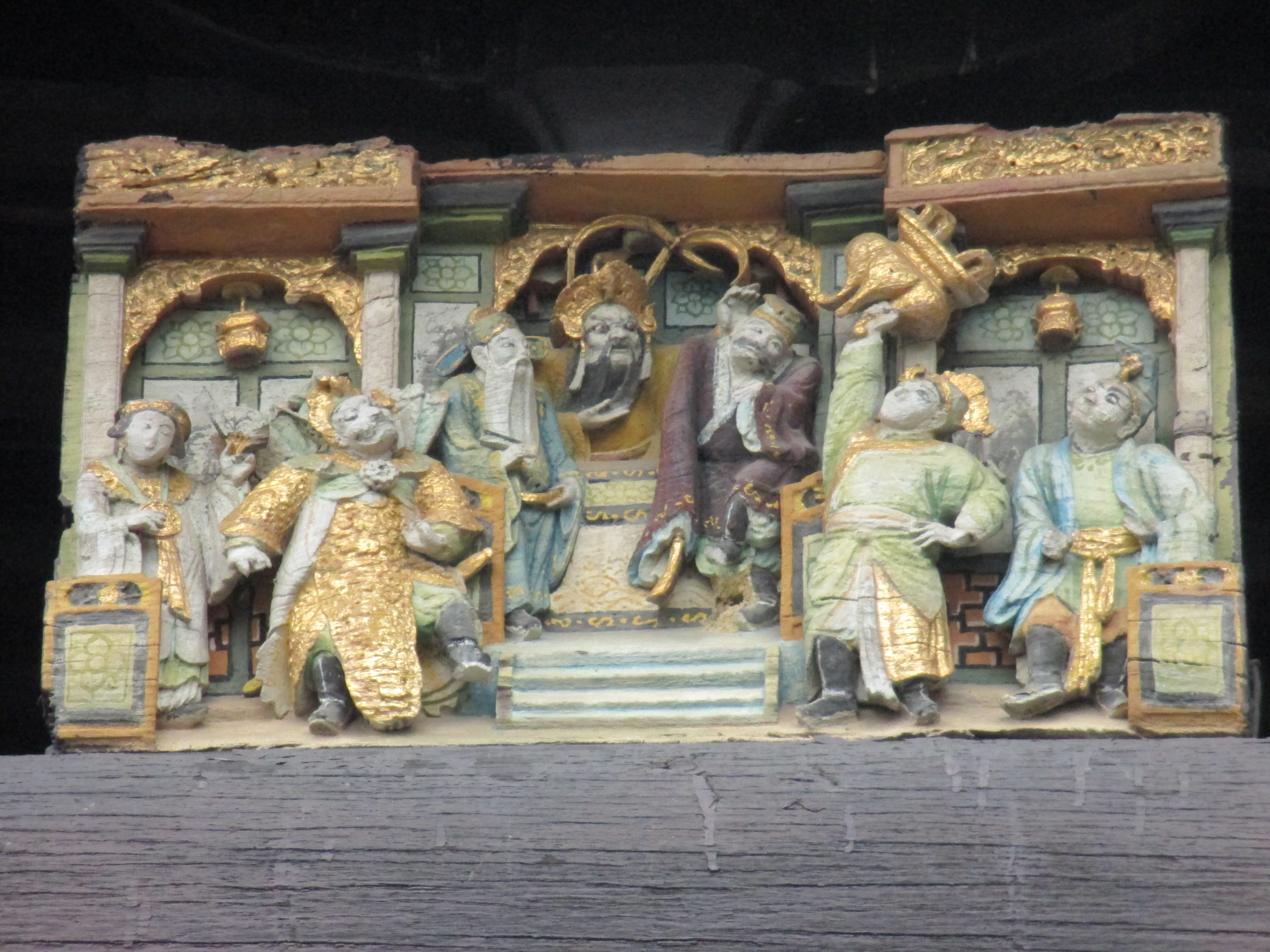
Relief at the front of the building.

The Tang Chung Ling Ancestral Hall (Chinese: 鄧松嶺祠堂) is the main ancestral hall of the Tang Clan of Lung Yeuk Tau and one of the largest ancestral halls in Hong Kong. It is still used for worship and celebrations of traditional festivals and ceremonies, as well as a meeting place for the Tang Clan of Lung Yeuk Tau. It is located in between Lo Wai and Tsz Tong Tsuen in Lung Yeuk Tau, Fanling, North District, in the New Territories of Hong Kong.

== History ==
The ancestral hall was built in 1525 in memory of the founding ancestor, Tang Chung Ling (鄧松嶺) (1303-1387), the sixth generation descendant of the clan. From the 1940s to the 1950s, the Ancestral Hall was also used as a village school. Until the mid-1990s, women were traditionally not allowed to enter the Ancestral Hall.

== Description ==
Tang Chung Ling Ancestral Hall is a three-hall building with two spacious internal courtyards. An annex, which serves as a kitchen is attached to the right of the building (eastern side). The "dong chung" is placed at the central hall.

The rear hall is divided into three chambers. The central chamber houses the ancestral tablets of the ancestors of the clan including the ancestral tablets of the Song princess and her husband Wai-Kap whose posthumous title was Fu Ma (附馬) Tang Wai-Kap (husband of a princess). Their ancestral tablets were elaborately carved with dragon heads, which distinguished them from the others. The chamber to the left is dedicated to the ancestors who had made significant contributions to the clan or those who achieved high ranks in the imperial court. The chamber to the right, on the other hand, is for the righteous members of the clan, one of whom is Tang Si-meng, a brave servant who saved the life of his master. In the late 16th century, he was kidnapped with his master. Claiming to be the son of his master, he volunteered to be detained by the kidnappers in exchange for the release of his master to raise ransom. After the departure of his master, he jumped into the sea and sacrificed himself. He was awarded the posthumous title of "Loyal Servant" and worshiped in this hall.

The whole building is decorated with fine wood carvings, polychrome plaster mouldings, and murals of auspicious motifs.

== Conservation ==
The Hall has been renovated a number of times, but the structure did not change much. A significant renovation was carried out in 1921, and a major one in 1990-1992. The Tang Chung Ling Ancestral Hall was declared a monument in November 1997. It is located along the Lung Yeuk Tau Heritage Trail.

== See also ==
- Tang Ancestral Hall (Ha Tsuen), a declared monument
- Tang Ancestral Hall (Ping Shan), a declared monument
