= Tang Ancestral Hall (Ping Shan) =

Coordinates: 22.445006°N 114.008208°E

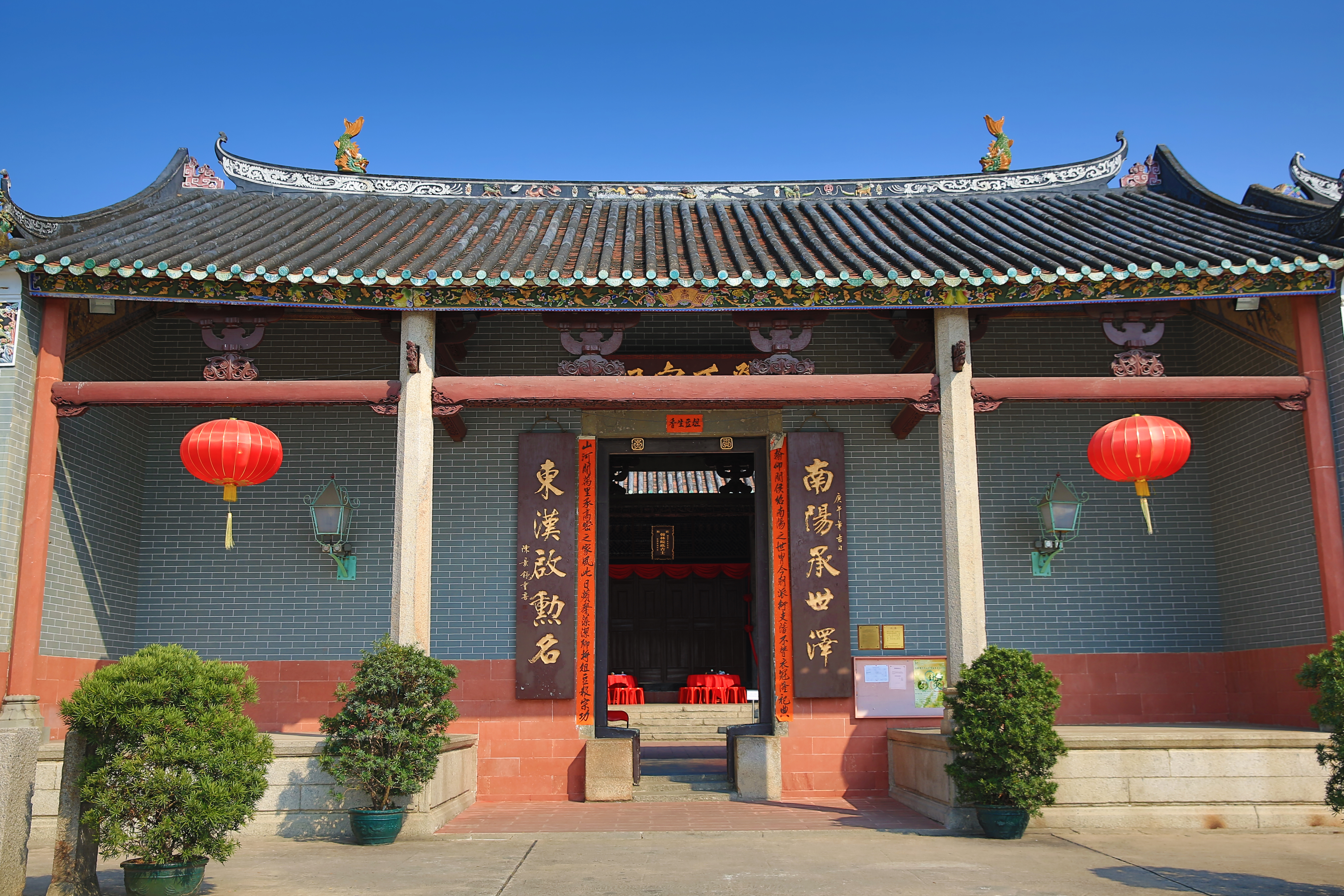
Tang Ancestral Hall in Ping Shan

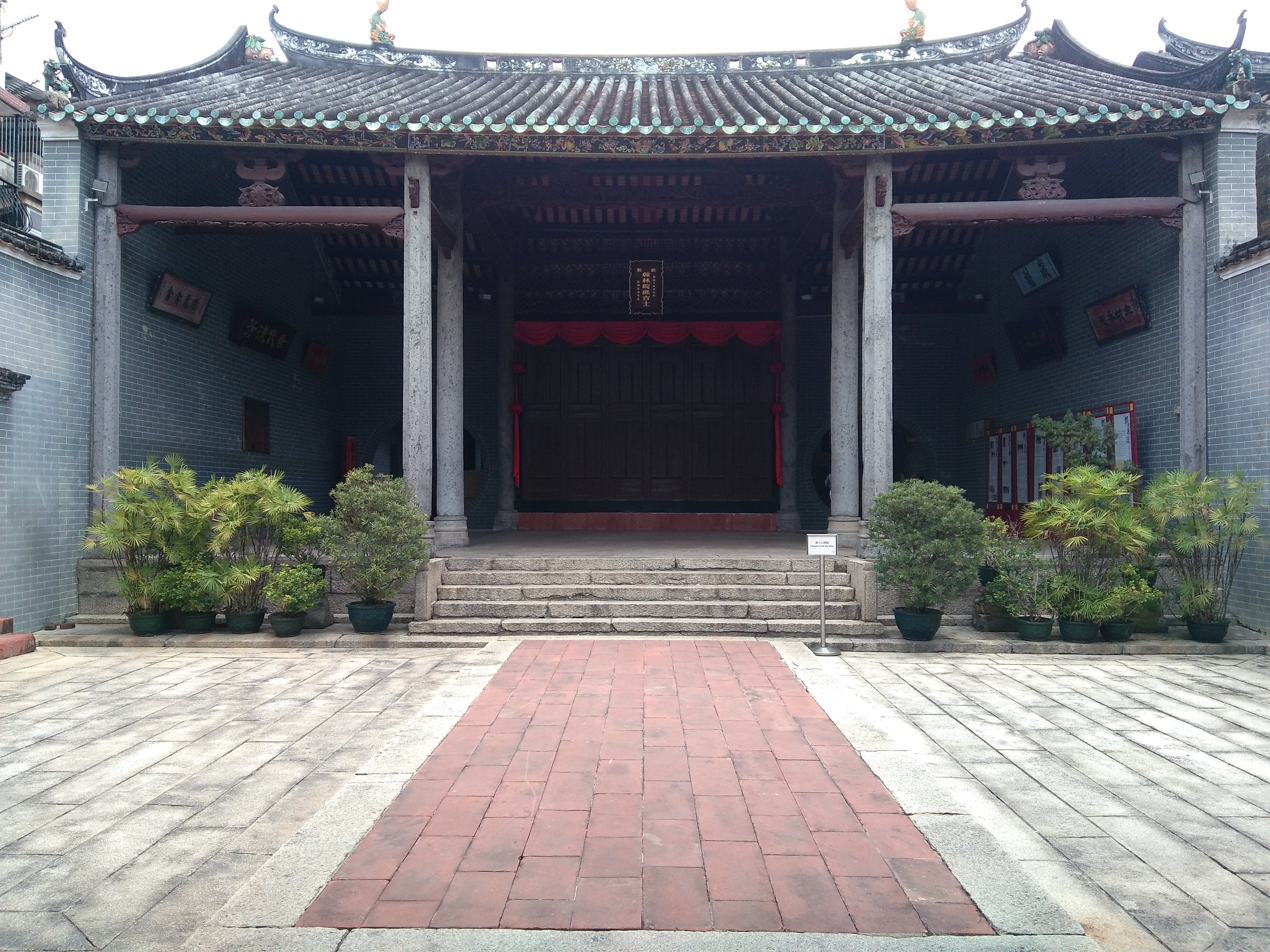
Central hall

The Tang Ancestral Hall (Chinese: 屏山鄧氏宗祠) in Ping Shan, in the Yuen Long District of Hong Kong, is one of the largest ancestral halls in Hong Kong. Located between Hang Mei Tsuen and Hang Tau Tsuen, and adjacent to the Yu Kiu Ancestral Hall, it is the main ancestral hall of the Tang clan of Ping Shan.

The ancestral hall is still used regularly for worship and celebrations of traditional festivals and ceremonies, as well as a meeting place for the Tang clan of Ping Shan.

== History ==
It was constructed by Tang Fung-shun (鄧馮遜), the fifth generation ancestor of Tang Clan about 700 years ago.

== Features ==
The Tang Ancestral Hall is a three-hall structure with two internal courtyards. The wooden brackets and beams of the three halls are carved with auspicious Chinese motifs. Shiwan dragon-fish and pottery unicorns decorate the main ridges and roofs. There are ancestral tablets at the altar at the rear hall.

== Conservation ==
The Tang Ancestral Hall of Ping Shan is a declared monument since 2001. It is situated along the Ping Shan Heritage Trail.

== See also ==
- Tang Ancestral Hall (Ha Tsuen), a declared monument
- Tang Chung Ling Ancestral Hall, a declared monument
