= Siu Hang Tsuen (North District) =

Village of Hong Kong

Coordinates: 22.50951°N 114.14721°E

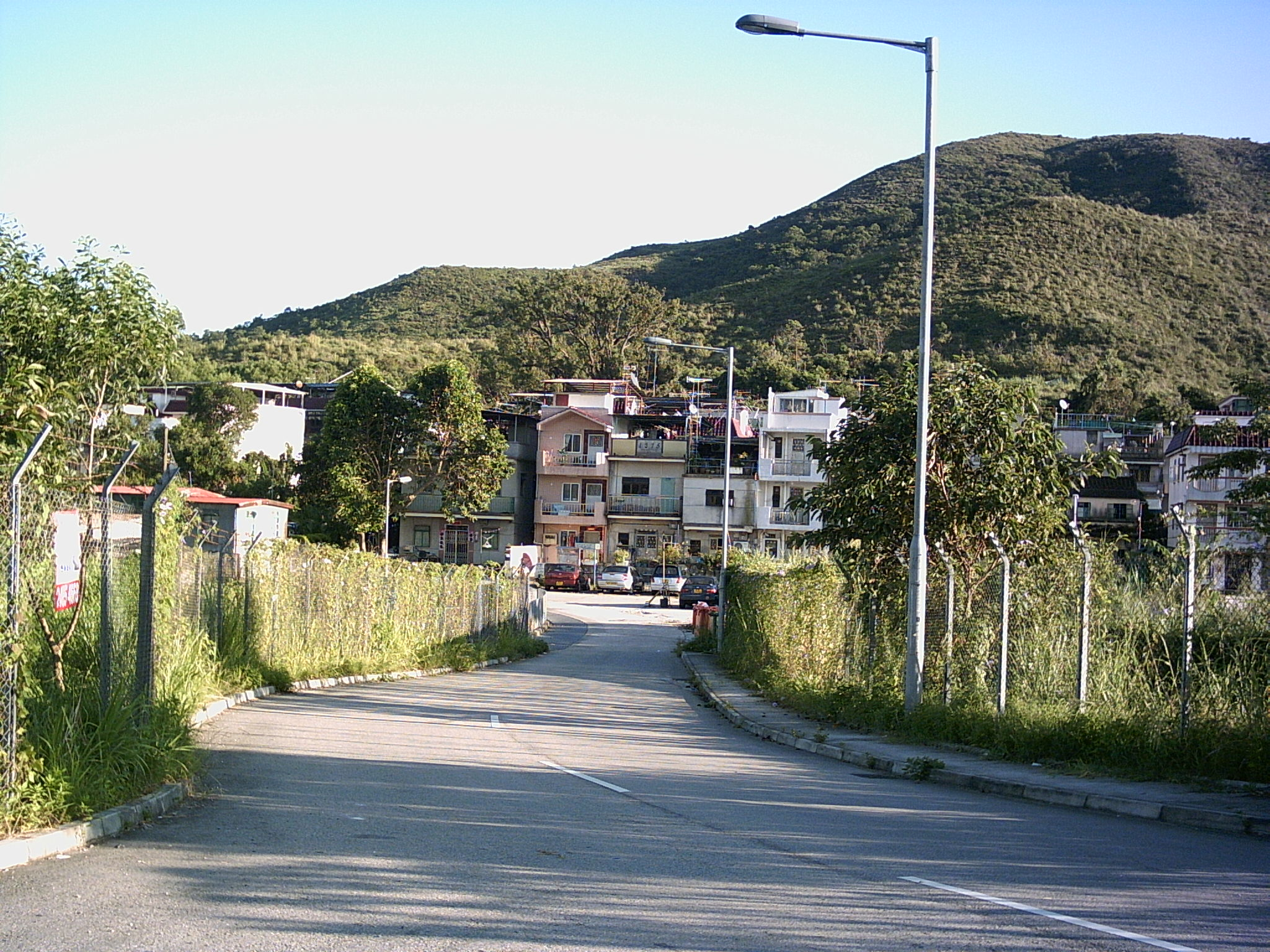
Siu Hang Tsuen.

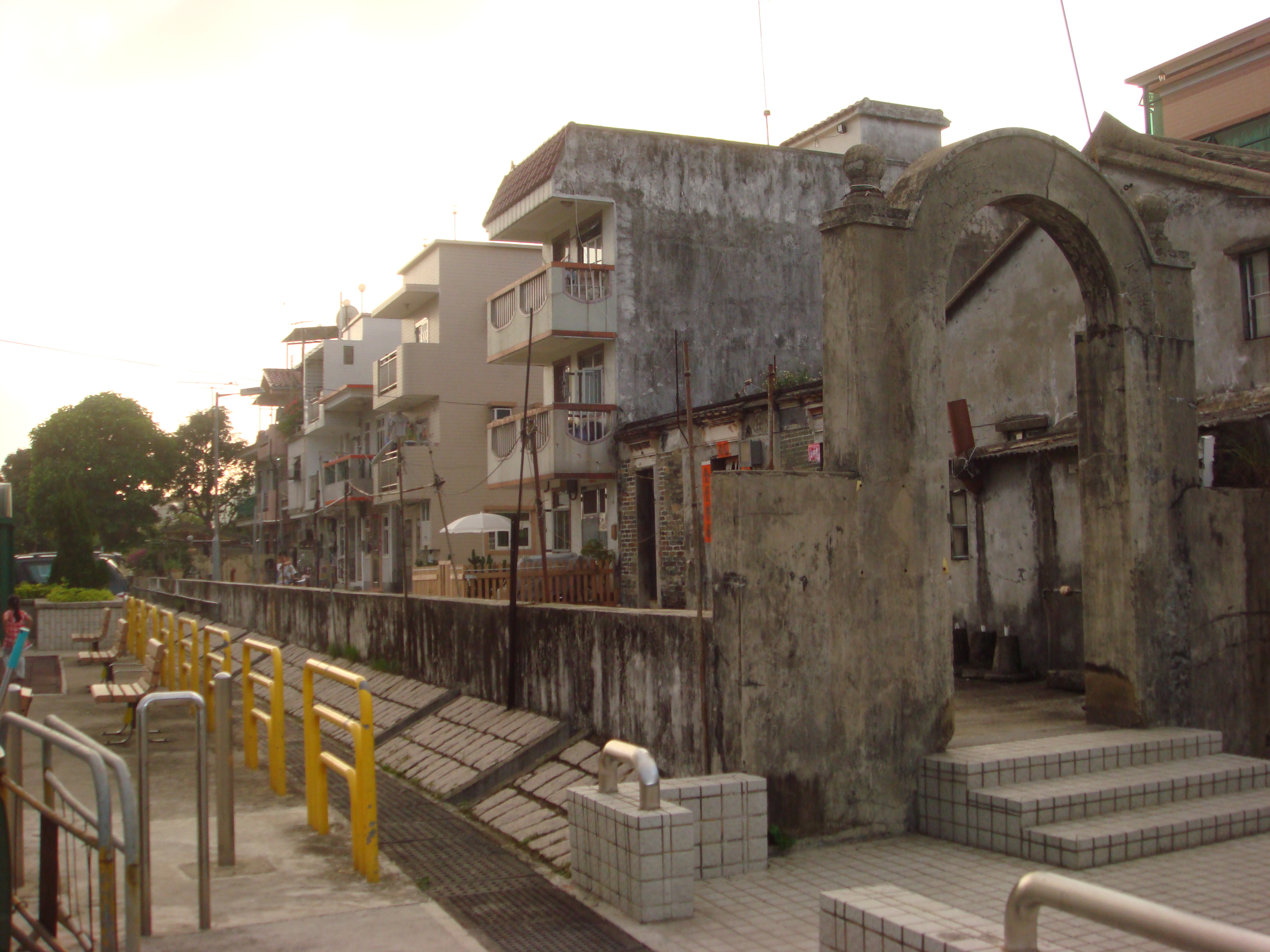
View of the wall and the archway of Siu Hang Tsuen in 2008.

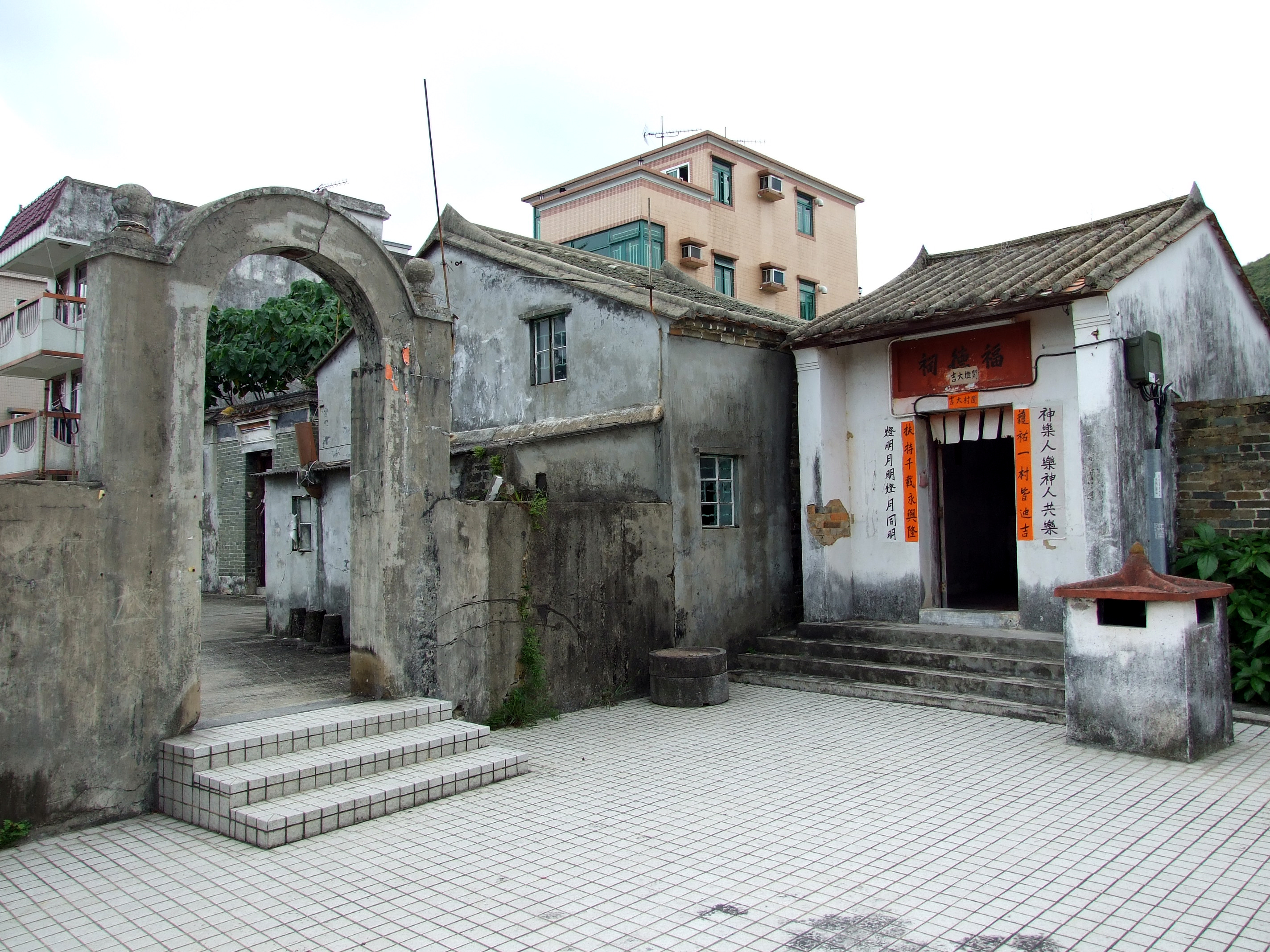
Archway and Fuk Tak Temple (福德祠) in Siu Hang Tsuen.

Siu Hang Tsuen (Chinese: 小坑村) is a village of Hong Kong, located in Lung Yeuk Tau, Fanling, North District. It is one of the five Wai (walled villages) and six Tsuen (villages) in Lung Yeuk Tau. Siu Hang Tsuen (小坑新村; 'Siu Hang New Village') is located directly to its west.

== Administration ==
Siu Hang San Tsuen (小坑新村) is a recognized village under the New Territories Small House Policy. Siu Hang Tsuen is one of the villages represented within the Fanling District Rural Committee. For electoral purposes, Siu Hang Tsuen is part of the Queen's Hill constituency, which is currently represented by Law Ting-tak.

== History ==
At the time of the 1911 census, the population of Siu Hang was 42. The number of males was 25.

== Features ==
There is a wall in front of the village. It was built, together with the archway at the eastern entrance, for feng shui purposes around 1960. A Fuk Tak Temple (福德祠) for the worship of the Earth God is located near the archway. It was built about 100 years ago.
