= San Uk Tsuen (Lung Yeuk Tau) =

Village in Hong Kong

Coordinates: 22.504282°N 114.148562°E

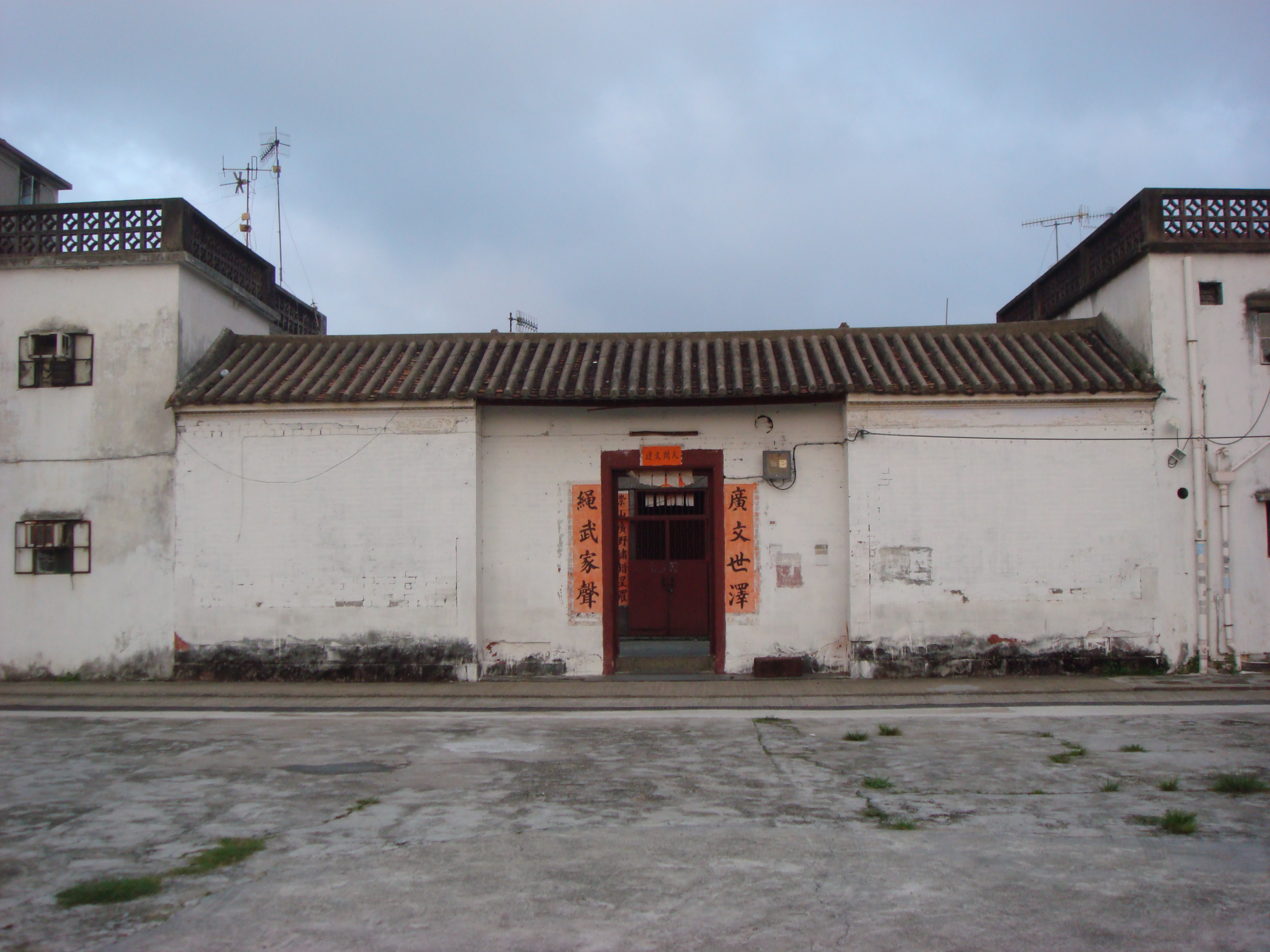
Sin Shut Study Hall in San Uk Tsuen.

San Uk Tsuen (Chinese: 新屋村) is a village of Hong Kong, located in Lung Yeuk Tau, Fanling, North District. It is one of the 11 villages of the Tang Clan established in Lung Yeuk Tau, collectively known as the five Wai (walled villages) and six Tsuen (villages) in Lung Yeuk Tau.

== Features ==
Sin Shut Study Hall a.k.a. Shin Shut Study Hall (善述書室) in San Uk Tsuen is listed as a Grade I historic building.
