= Law Ting-tak =

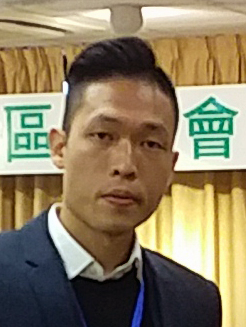
Jasper Law

Jasper Law Ting-tak (Chinese: 羅庭德) is a Hong Kong politician who is a former chairman of the North District Council. Law ran as an independent in the 2019 District Council elections and won his seat on a comfortable majority.

Law is considered a localist, which is to say that he stands for resistance to encroachment by the Chinese Communist Party into the affairs of Hong Kong. He is stridently anti-government, aspiring to "win Government House, and become part of the governing alliance of the administration" under a new constitution. Turning only 25 in 2019, Law is the first of such politician to chair a District Council in Hong Kong.

== Advocacies ==
Law's interest naturally lies in happenings in the North District. He advocates for a holistic planning and development strategies to minimise red tape and maximise effectiveness. He also stands up for the conservation of an indigenous Indian temple in Kwan Tei, Fanling.

Political offices
Preceded by Tony Tang	Member of the North District Council; Representative for Queen's Hill; 2020–2023	Succeeded by Constituency abolished
Preceded by So Sai-chi	Chairman of the North District Council; 2020–2023	Succeeded by Derek Lai
