= Queen's Hill (constituency) =

Hong Kong constituency

- Elected constituency for the North District Council
- Boundary of Queen's Hill in North District
- District: North
- Legislative Council constituency: New Territories North
- Population: 18,344 (2019)
- Electorate: 8,864 (2019)

Current constituency
- Created: 1982
- Number of members: One
- Member: Law Ting-tak (Independent)

Queen's Hill (Chinese: 皇后山) is one of the 18 constituencies in the North District, Hong Kong.

The constituency returns one district councillor to the North District Council, with an election every four years.

Queen's Hill constituency has an estimated population of 18,344.

== Councillors represented ==
Election	Member	Party
1982	Tang Kwok-yung	Nonpartisan
1988	Tony Tang Kun-nin	Nonpartisan
1991	Tony Tang Kun-nin	LDF
1995	Tony Tang Kun-nin	DAB
2003	Wong Kam-sang	Nonpartisan
2007	Tony Tang Kun-nin	DAB
2019	Law Ting-tak	Nonpartisan

== Election results ==
=== 2010s ===
North District Council Election, 2019: Queen's Hill
Party	Candidate	Votes	%	±%
Nonpartisan	Law Ting-tak	2,969	53.28	
DAB	Tony Tang Kun-nin	2,054	36.86	
Nonpartisan	Tang Chun-kin	549	9.85	
Majority		915	16.42	
Turnout		5,586	63.07	
Nonpartisan gain from DAB		Swing		
