= Ko Po Tsuen =

Ko Po Tsuen or Ko Po Village (Chinese: 高埔村), is the name of several villages in Hong Kong:

- Ko Po Tsuen, North District, in Kwan Tei, Fanling, North District
- Ko Po Tsuen, Yuen Long District, in Kam Tin, Yuen Long District
