= Ko Po =

Ko Po may refer to:

- Ko Po, an island in Krabi Province, Thailand, part of the Lanta Islands
- Ko Po Tsuen, North District, a village in the North District of Hong Kong
- Ko Po Tsuen, Yuen Long District, a village in the Kam Tin area of Yuen Long District, Hong Kong
