= Lau Shui Heung Reservoir =

Irrigation reservoir in New Territories, Hong Kong

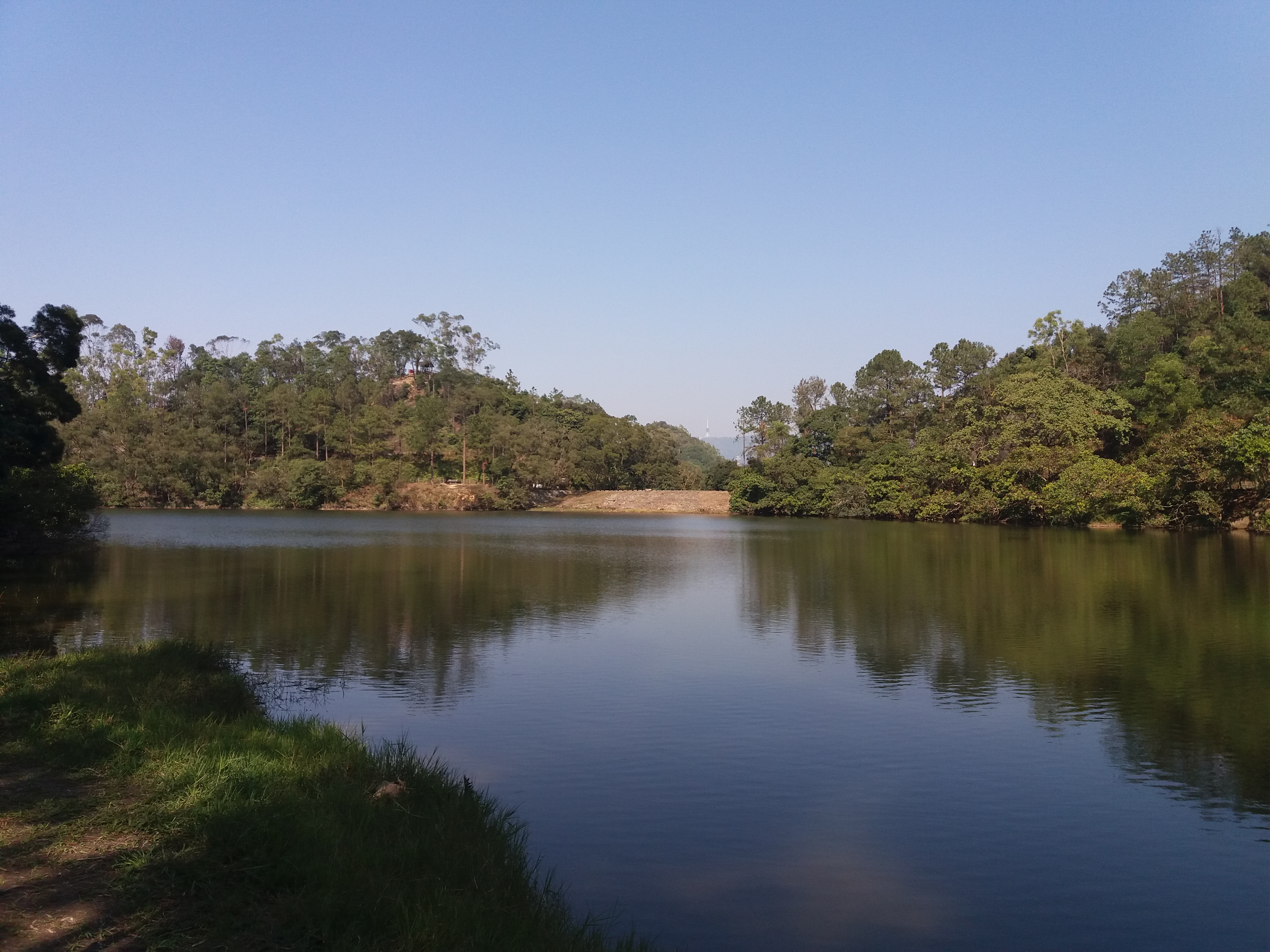
- Lau Shui Heung Reservoir

- Location within Hong Kong
- Location: North District, New Territories, Hong Kong
- Coordinates: 22.4956244°N 114.1667994°E
- Type: reservoir
- Built: 1968; 58 years ago
- Surface area: 3.5 hectares (8.6 acres)
- Water volume: 170,000 cubic metres (6,000,000 cu ft)

Lau Shui Heung Reservoir
- Traditional Chinese: 流水響水塘
Transcriptions
Yue: Cantonese
- Yale Romanization: Làuh séui héung séui tòhng
- Jyutping: Lau4 seoi2 hoeng2 seoi2 tong4

Lau Shui Heung Reservoir, built in 1968 as part of the Plover Cove Reservoir engineering programme, is a reservoir located within the boundary of Pat Sin Leng Country Park in the eastern part of North District, New Territories, Hong Kong, located at the northeast area of Bird's Hill, at the northeast end of Sheung Shui-Fanling Plain. It covers an area of 3.5 hectares (8.6 acres) and a water storage capacity of 170,000 m^{3}. It is used for collecting water from the northwestern part of Pat Sin Leng and supplying it to the Plover Cove Reservoir through a water conveyance tunnel, while Lau Shui Heung Reservoir is an irrigation reservoir used to irrigate nearby farmland. The Lau Shui Heung Country Trail passes through the reservoir. The main concrete dam is 24 m high and 54.9 m long, the secondary dam is 7.3 m high and 39 m long and the scale of the reservoir is small. The reservoir is the main source of Kwan Tei River, and the water from the reservoir flows into Kwan Tei and then the Ng Tung River.

== History ==
The reservoir was formed at the head of a valley with the construction of a 12m concrete gravity dam and a 10m earth-filled dam to connect with a tunnel to provide water transfer to Hok Tau Reservoir. Construction started in 1966 and was completed in 1968.

In April 2018, mountain hikers discovered that the Lau Shui Heung Reservoir had been severely dried up recently, and cracks were seen at the bottom of the reservoir. They could walk down the reservoir to the opposite bank. The Water Supplies Department stated that the lack of rainfall in the past winter amid irrigation by nearby villagers had led to water depletion in the reservoir. However, the nearby Hok Tau Reservoir, which is also an irrigation pond and of the same size, did not dry up. It was suspected that the nearby Lung Shan Tunnel Project had drained the groundwater. Until the beginning of June that year, due to the influence of the outer rainbands associated with Tropical Storm Ewiniar, nearly 100 mm of rainfall had fallen in the past 3 days, which was more than 10 mm more than the total rainfall of the past two months. At the same time, more than 200 mm of rainfall was recorded in the past 24 hours in the northern New Territories, enough to fill the reservoir with a capacity of 170,000 m^{3} and restore the title of "mirror of the sky".

== Environment and ecology ==
The entire reservoir is surrounded by tree-lined valleys and mature woodlands, with rows of Melaleuca trees growing by the reservoir.

The reservoir is quite deep, so the color of the reservoir is green, known as mirror of the sky in Hong Kong; the bottom of the reservoir is covered with sand and rocks of various sizes, providing a diverse habitat for different fishes. Many fish species can be found in the reservoirs, including Channa asiatica, which is uncommon in Hong Kong. Because of its location in a deep valley, it became a popular place for people to go out and barbecue there.

== See also ==
- List of reservoirs of Hong Kong
- Lau Shui Heung
