= Leng Pei Tsuen =

Village in Fanling, Hong Kong

Leng Pei Tsuen Chinese: 領皮村
- Village
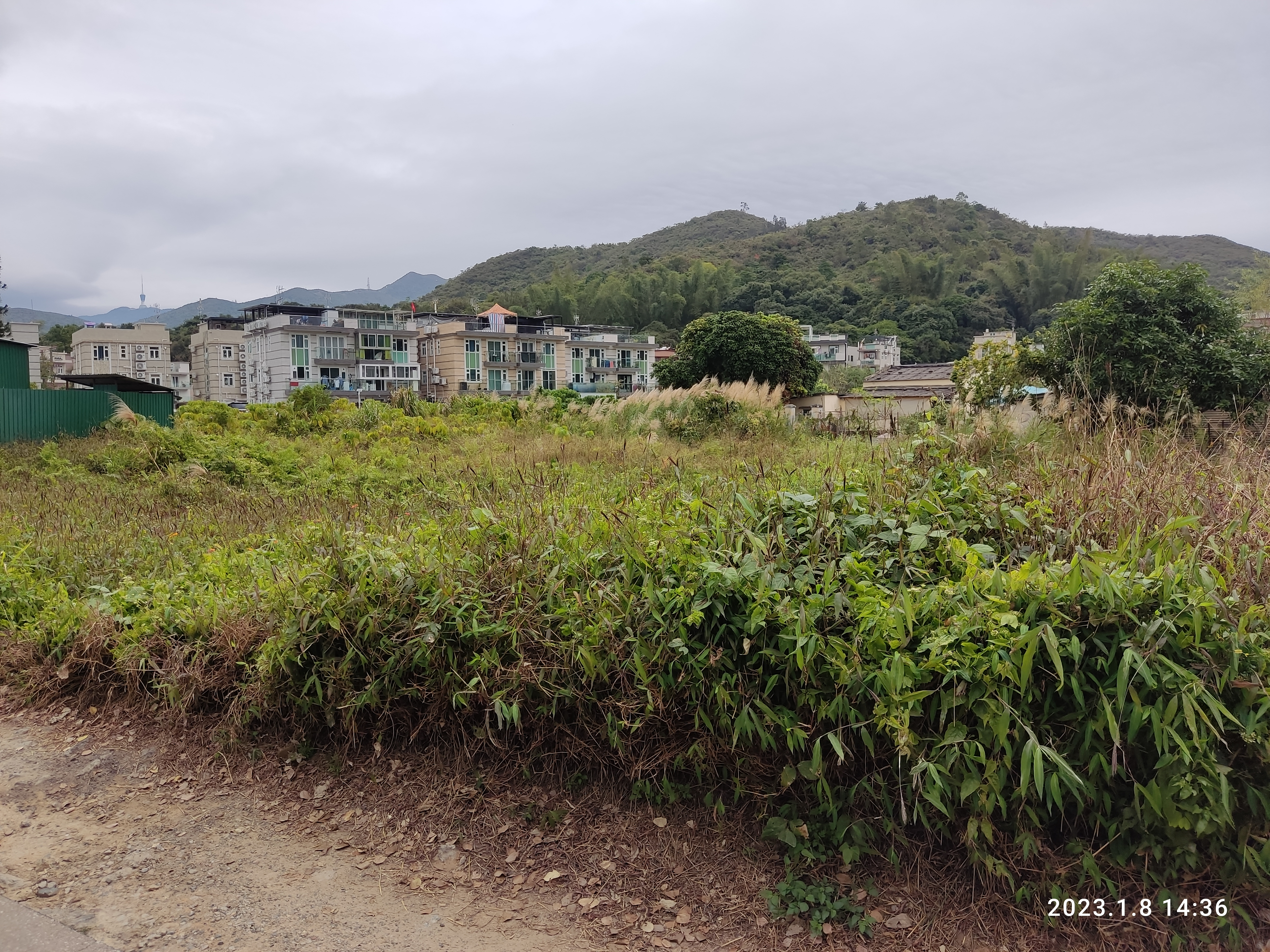
- Distant view of Leng Pei Tsuen

- Location within Hong Kong
- Coordinates: 22.5152876°N 114.1772642°E
- Country: People's Republic of China
- Special administrative region: Hong Kong
- District: North District
- Area: Fanling
- Time zone: UTC+8:00 (HKT)

Leng Pei Tsuen (Chinese: 領皮村) is a village in Fanling, North District, Hong Kong.

== Administration ==
Leng Pei Tsuen is a recognized village under the New Territories Small House Policy. It is one of the villages represented within the Fanling District Rural Committee. For electoral purposes, Leng Pei Tsuen is part of the Queen's Hill constituency, which is currently represented by Law Ting-tak.

== History ==
In 2020, the Drainage Services Department had announced the tender of the construction consisting of about six kilometres of sewers in three unsewered areas in Fanling Wai, So Kwun Po and Leng Pei Tsuen to improve environmental hygiene and further reduce the amount of pollutants being discharged into the nearby River Indus and Deep Bay. The project commenced in January 2021 and is expected to be completed in 2025, costing about HK$180,000,000.
