= Fan Leng Lau =

Human settlement in Hong Kong

Coordinates: 22.4973°N 114.1406°E

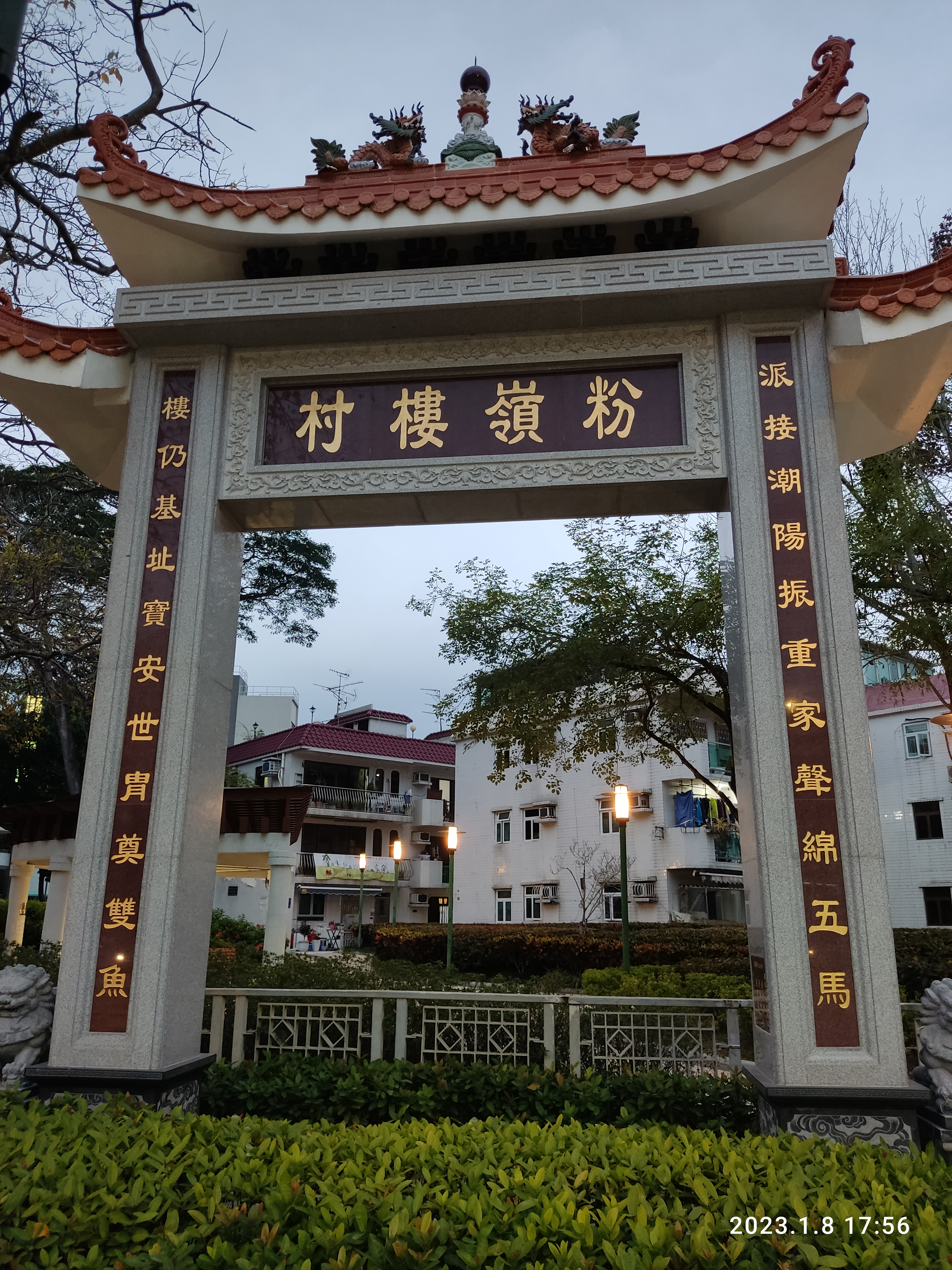
Paifang of Fan Leng Lau.

Fan Leng Lau (Chinese: 粉嶺樓) is a village in Fanling, in the North District of the New Territories of Hong Kong.

== Administration ==
Fan Leng Lau is a recognized village under the New Territories Small House Policy. It is one of the villages represented within the Fanling District Rural Committee. For electoral purposes, Fan Leng Lau is part of the Fanling Town constituency, which is currently represented by Wong Hoi-ying.

== History ==
Pang Kwei (彭桂) was the founding ancestor of the Pang (彭) Clan who went to Lung Shan (龍山), now known as Lung Yeuk Tau in Fanling from Dongguan, Guangzhou in mainland China in 1190. He then moved to Fan Leng Lau in 1220 and established a village there. As the population of the clan increased, they moved westward to settle in Fanling Wai and other places.
