= Tao Heung Foods of Mankind Museum =

Coordinates: 22.3977°N 114.1983°E

- 稻鄉飲食文化博物館
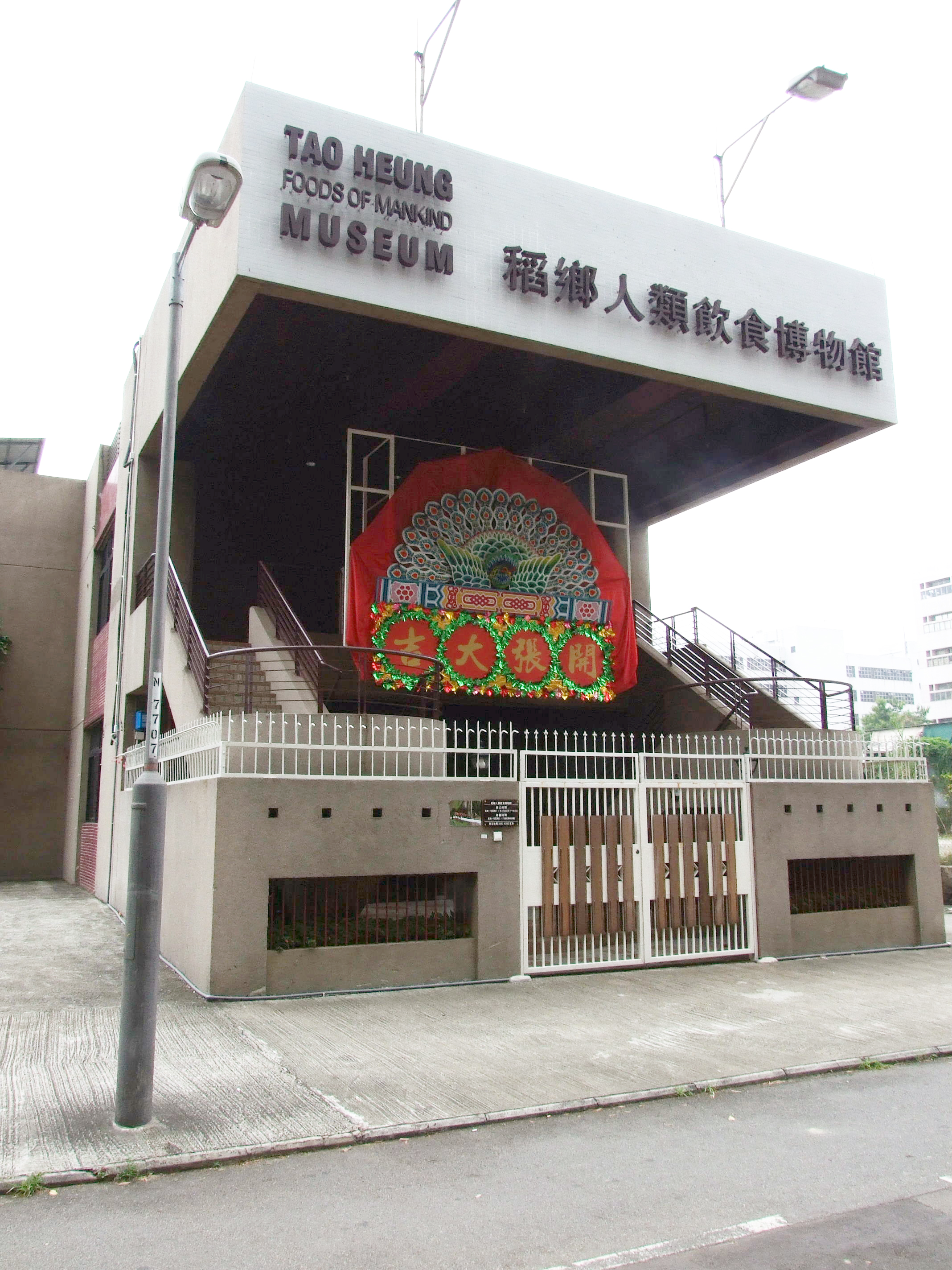
- Former location of the Tao Heung Foods of Mankind Museum in Fanling.
- Established: First opened in Hong Kong, relocated in 2008
- Location: Hong Kong
- Type: Food museum
- Collection size: Food cultures from around the world

Tao Heung Foods of Mankind Museum (Chinese: 稻鄉飲食文化博物館), formerly Foods of Mankind Museum, is the first 'foods of mankind' museum in Hong Kong. It is one of the few museums not run and funded by the government.

It was housed in a two-floored building at 1 Lok Tin Street, On Lok Tsuen, Fanling, Hong Kong but closed in 2005 due to lack of funds. The museum introduced the food cultures of different countries from the past to the present.

The museum was reopened on 15 October 2005. In 2008 it moved to Fo Tan, Sha Tin District.

== Facilities ==
=== Before October 2005 ===
The museum formerly included an activity room, exhibition rooms, a tuck shop and a souvenir shop. The Ground floor of the museum was divided into Egyptian, tea, coffee and wine sections. There were also three minor exhibition rooms: the French restaurant, the kitchen of a Chinese tribe and a room that details the early use of fire for cooking. Nearly 1,000 exhibits, including herbs, food samples, cutlery, kitchen tools, stoves and model kitchens from all around the world were displayed; visitors could handle most of them.

The Egyptian section showed the different kinds of containers that the Egyptians used to carry water. The tea section, coffee section and wine section displayed different kinds of the drinks and related tools. A minor exhibition room was set up with a dining table in a French restaurant detailing the formal place settings of knives, forks, spoons, plates and cups, with text explaining how each is used for different courses. On the same floor was also a tuck shop, where the visitors could enjoy snacks and drinks, and a souvenir shop selling different kinds of food-related items and ordinary stationery.

Workshops, such as on the making of chocolate, and other group activities were held on the first floor. There were also displays of different kinds of spaghetti and seasoning, a spaghetti-making machine, a sausage-making machine and a cane juice machine.

== See also ==
- List of museums in Hong Kong
