= Fu Tei Pai =

Village in Fanling, Hong Kong

Coordinates: 22.506977°N 114.163672°E

Fu Tei Pai (Chinese: 虎地排) is a village in Fanling, North District, Hong Kong.

== Administration ==
Fu Tei Pai is a recognized village under the New Territories Small House Policy.
