= Wa Mei Shan (village) =

Coordinates: 22.481484°N 114.140539°E

Wa Mei Shan (Chinese: 畫眉山) is a village in Fanling, in the North District of the New Territories of Hong Kong.

== Administration ==
Wa Mei Shan is a recognized village under the New Territories Small House Policy.
