= Lau Shui Heung =

Village in Fanling, Hong Kong

Coordinates: 22.500678°N 114.168351°E

Lau Shui Heung (Chinese: 流水響) is a village in Fanling, North District, Hong Kong.

== Administration ==
Lau Shui Heung is a recognized village under the New Territories Small House Policy.

== See also ==
- Lau Shui Heung Reservoir
- Kwan Tei
- Kwan Tei River
