= Kan Tau Tsuen =

Coordinates: 22.515366°N 114.173408°E

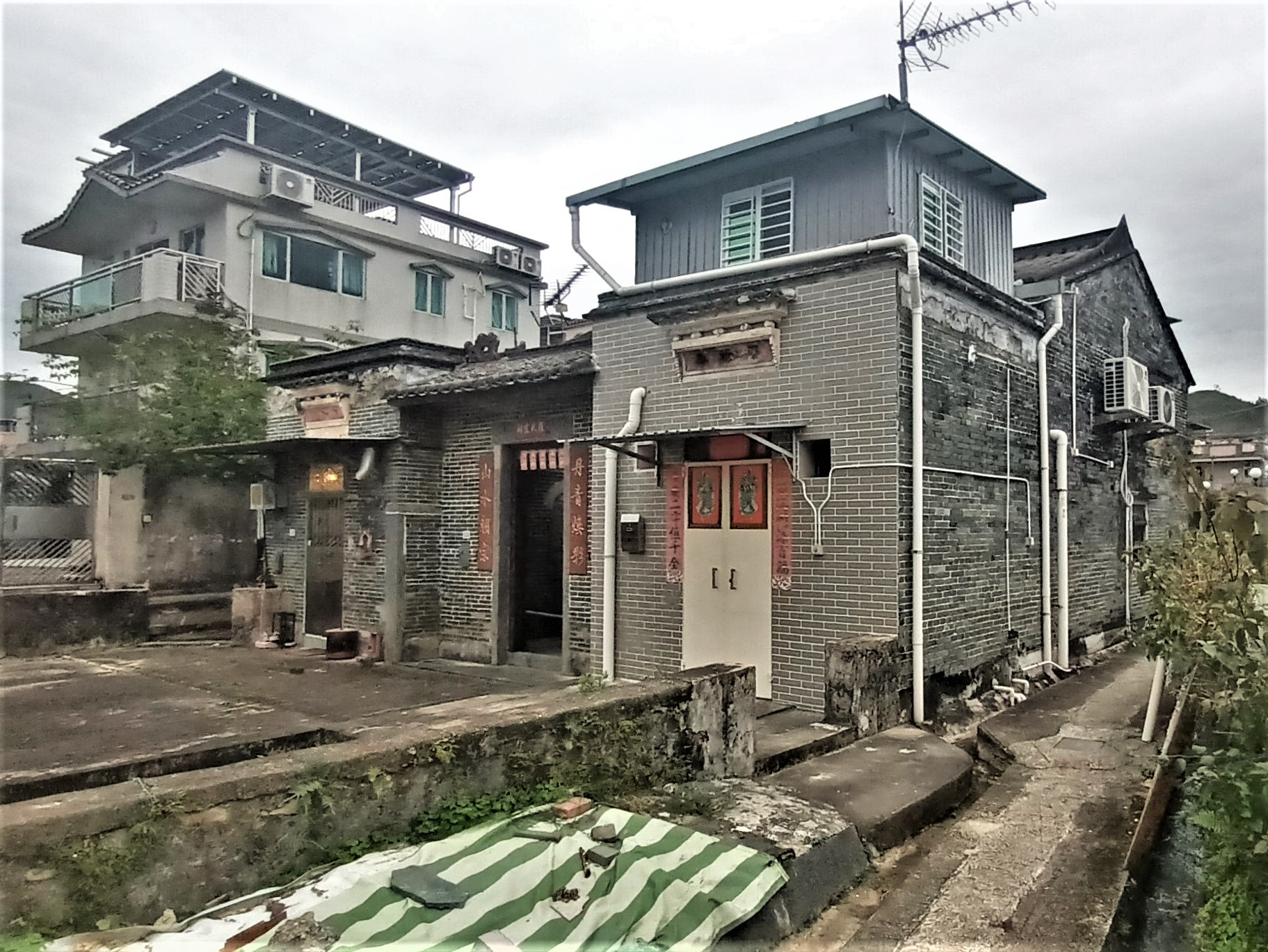
Law Ancestral Hall in Kan Tau Tsuen.

Kan Tau Tsuen (Chinese: 簡頭村) is a village of Hong Kong, located in Fanling, North District.

== Administration ==
Kan Tau Tsuen is a recognized village under the New Territories Small House Policy. It is one of the villages represented within the Fanling District Rural Committee. For electoral purposes, Kan Tau Tsuen is part of the Queen's Hill constituency, which is currently represented by Law Ting-tak.
