= Leng Tsai =

Village in Fanling, Hong Kong

Coordinates: 22.517599°N 114.1715°E

Leng Tsai (Chinese: 嶺仔) is a village in Fanling, North District, Hong Kong.

== Administration ==
Leng Tsai is a recognized village under the New Territories Small House Policy.
