= Ma Mei Ha =

Coordinates: 22.518014°N 114.176733°E

Ma Mei Ha (Chinese: 馬尾下) is a village situated in Fanling, within the North District of the New Territories in Hong Kong.

== Administration ==
Ma Mei Ha is recognized as a village under the New Territories Small House Policy.

== History ==
The historical significance of Ma Mei Ha is rooted in its association with the former Sha Tau Kok Railway, which operated from 1911 to 1928. The Ma Mei Ha station, inaugurated in February 1916, served as a vital transportation link during that period.

== Education ==
Ma Mei Ha falls within Primary One Admission (POA) School Net 81. The school net comprises several aided schools (independently operated but funded by the government), with no government schools in the network.

== See also ==
- Sha Tau Kok Railway
- Ma Mei Ha Leng Tsui
