= Sze Tau Leng =

Village in Fanling, Hong Kong

Coordinates: 22.507355°N 114.179935°E

- Traditional Chinese: 獅頭嶺
- Simplified Chinese: 狮头岭
- Cantonese Yale: Sītàuhléhng
- Literal meaning: 'Lion Head Ridge'
Transcriptions
Standard Mandarin
- Hanyu Pinyin: Shītóulǐng
- Wade–Giles: Shih^{1}-t‘ou^{2}-ling^{3}
- IPA: [ʂɨ́.tʰǒʊ.lìŋ]
Yue: Cantonese
- Yale Romanization: Sītàuhléhng
- Jyutping: si1 tau4 leng5
- IPA: [si˥.tʰɐw˩.lɛŋ˩˧]

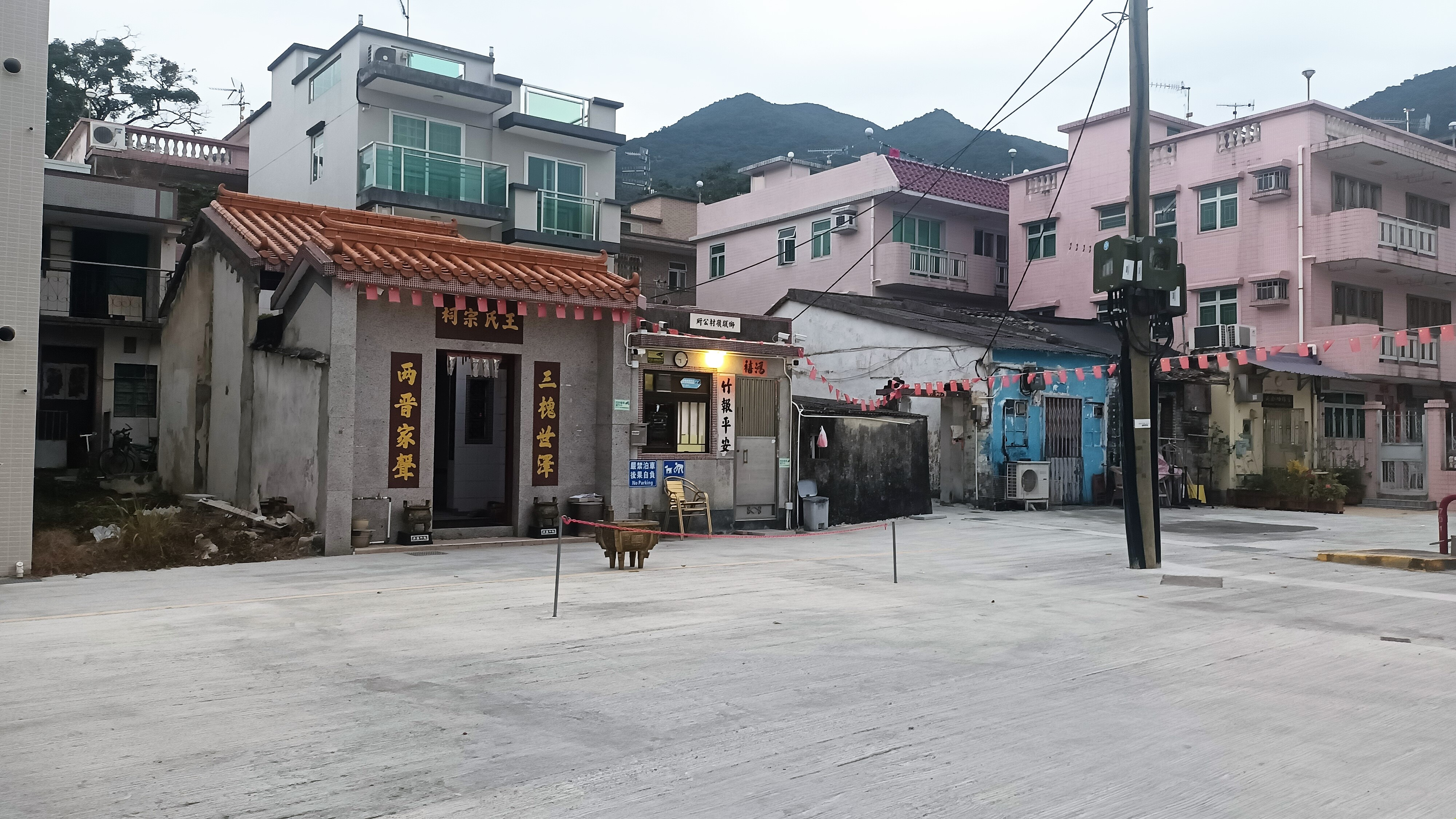
Wong Ancestral Hall and Village Office in Sze Tau Leng.

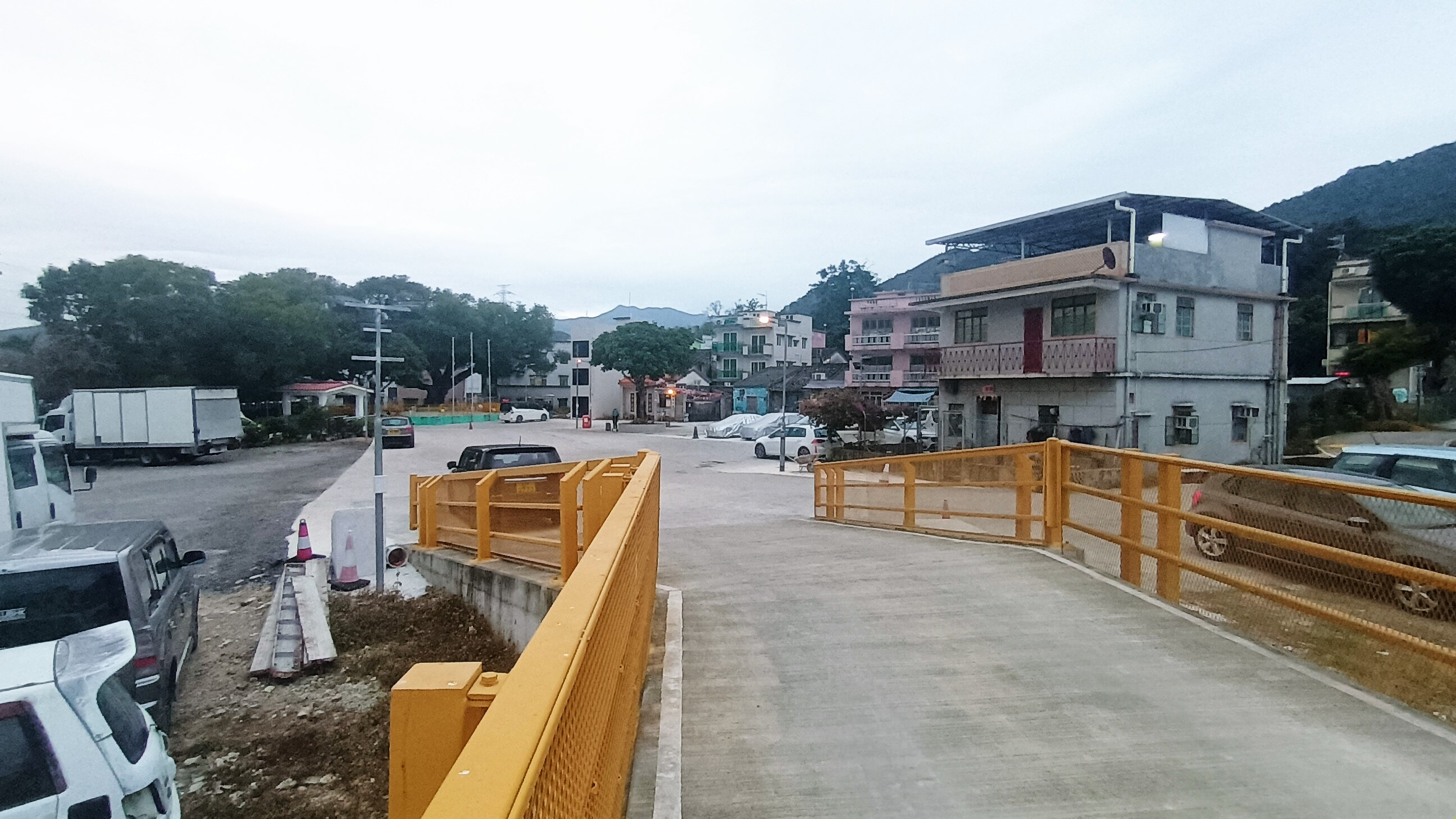
Sze Tau Leng.

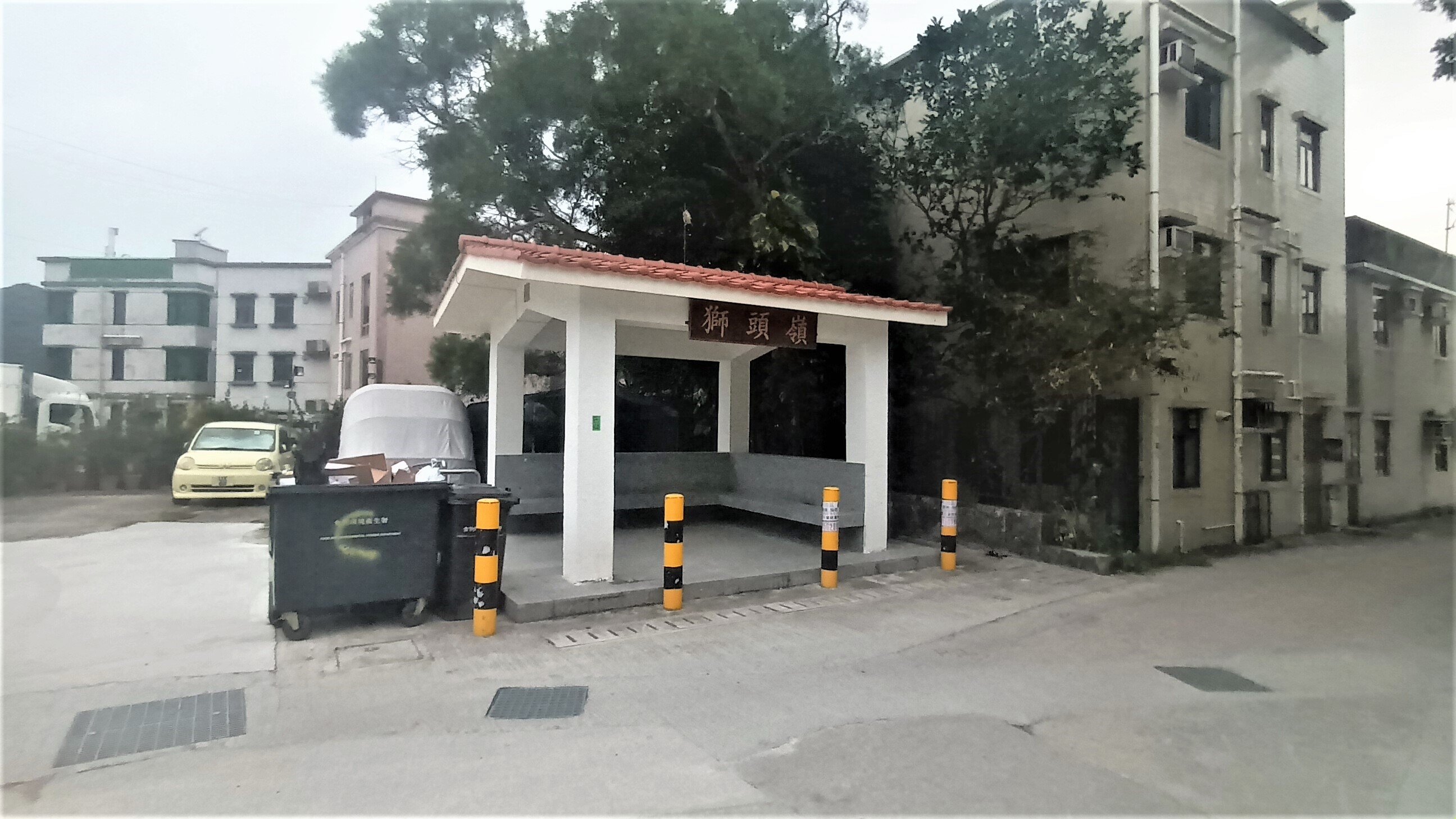
Pavilion in Sze Tau Leng.

Sze Tau Leng or Sz Tau Leng (Chinese: 獅頭嶺; Cantonese Yale: Sītàuhléhng) is a village in Fanling, North District, Hong Kong.

== History ==
Sze Tau Leng was historically a Hakka village, settled by the Wong (王) family more than 200 years ago. The flatlands around the village were used for growing rice, and most of them were now used for growing vegetables or have been abandoned.

== Features ==
A feng shui woodland with an area of 3 ha is located at the back of the Wong Ancestral Hall. It faces northeast and contains two Pak Kung (Earth God) shrines.
