= Ma Mei Ha Leng Tsui =

Village in Fanling, Hong Kong

Coordinates: 22.517274°N 114.17385°E

Ma Mei Ha Leng Tsui (Chinese: 馬尾下嶺咀) or Leng Tsui (高埔村) is a village in Fanling, North District, Hong Kong.

== Administration ==
Ma Mei Ha Leng Tsui is a recognized village under the New Territories Small House Policy.

== See also ==
- Ma Mei Ha
