= Kwan Tei =

Area in the New Territories of Hong Kong

Coordinates: 22.50937°N 114.160317°E

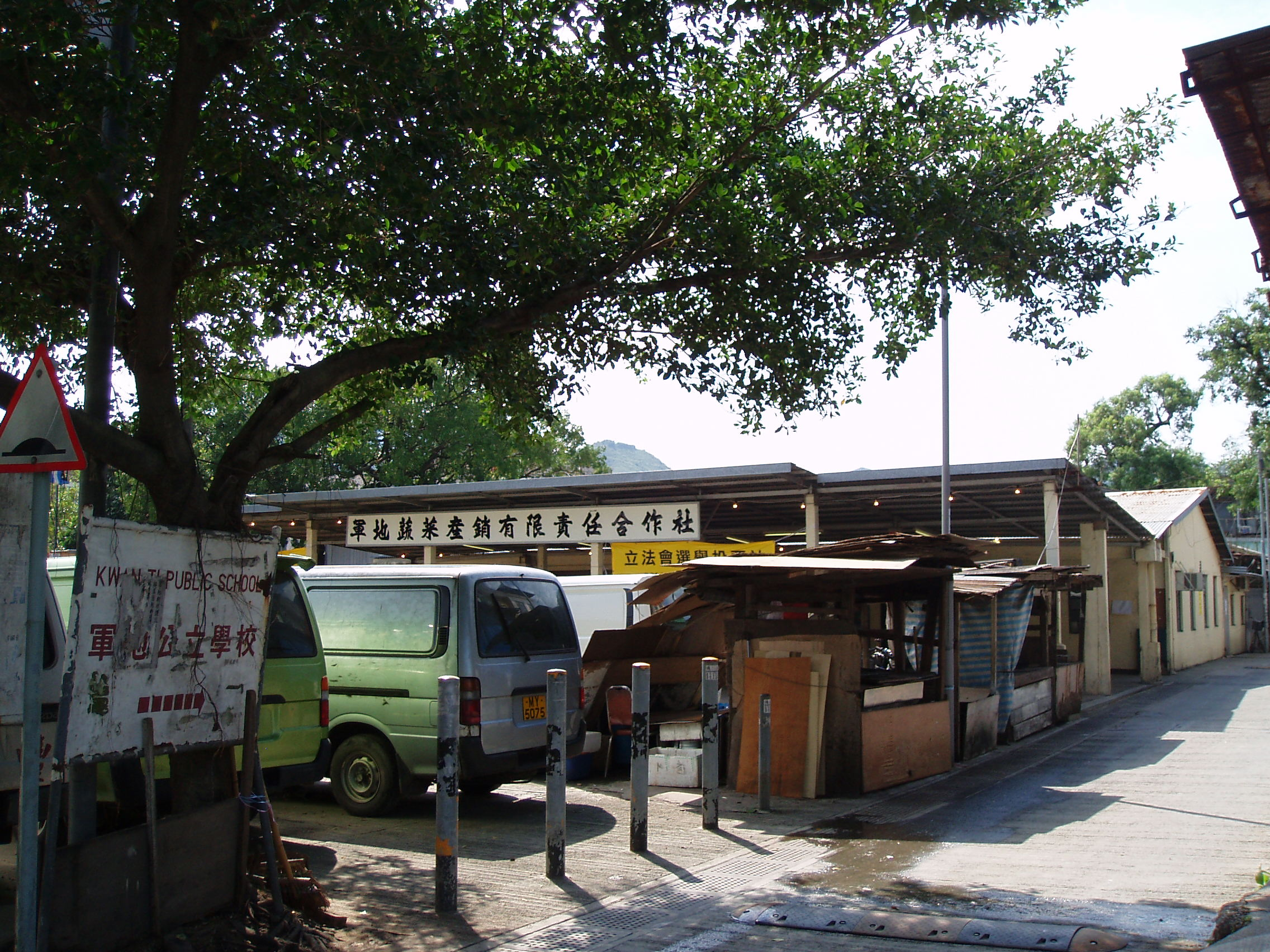
Kwan Tei Vegetable Market (軍地菜站).

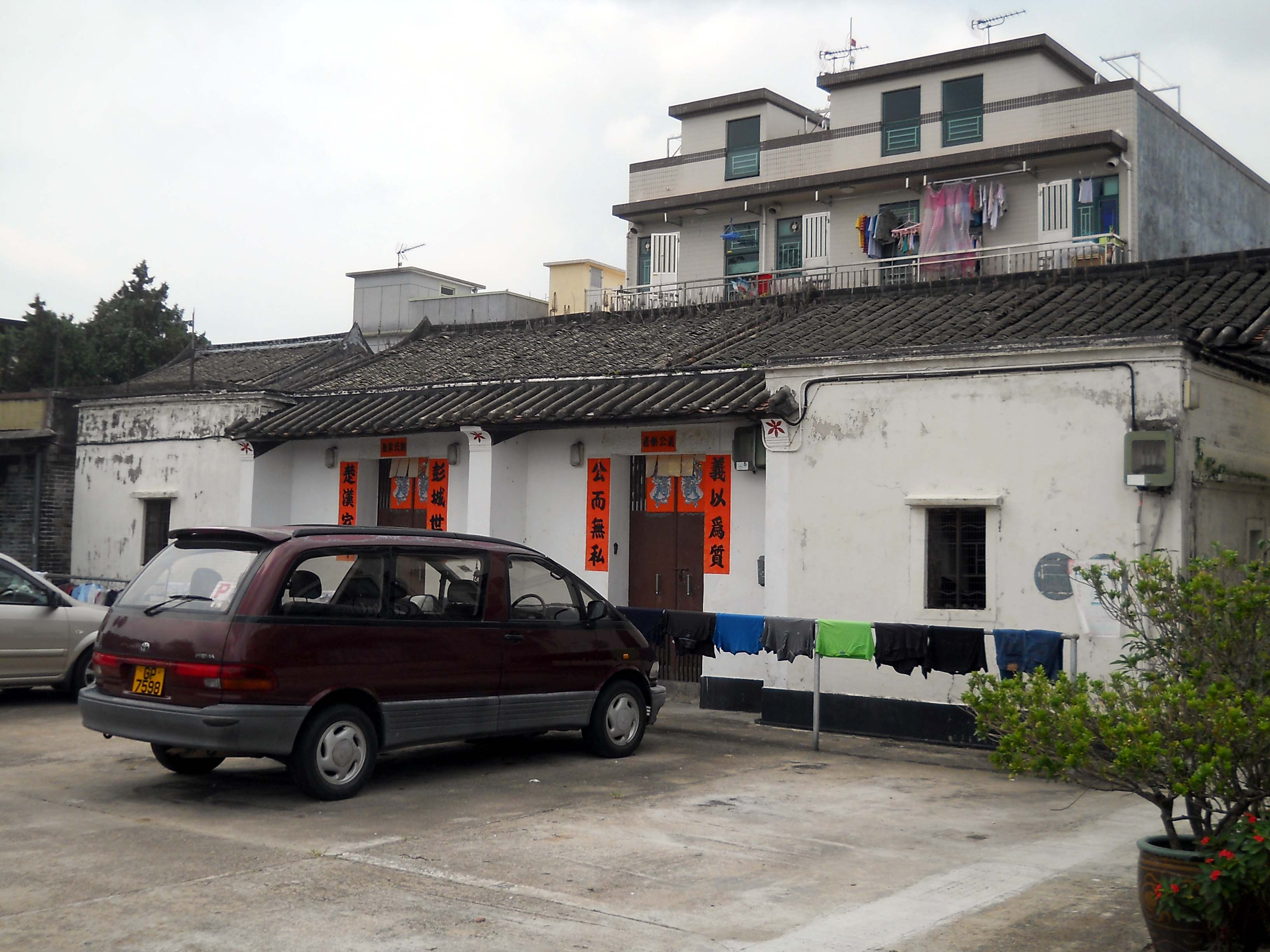
Yi Kung Lok Mansion (義公樂居) in Kwan Tei.

Kwan Tei (Chinese: 軍地; Jyutping: gwan^{1} dei^{6}) is an area in the New Territories of Hong Kong. It is northeast of Lung Yeuk Tau and at the northwest of Lau Shui Heung, namely northwest of the major new town of Fanling.

== Administration ==
Kwan Tei is a recognized village under the New Territories Small House Policy. For electoral purposes, Kwan Tei is part of the Queen's Hill constituency of the North District Council. It is currently represented by Law Ting-tak, who was elected in the local elections.

== Geography ==
The area situates on a plain surrounded by hills at its north and south. The Ng Tung River, Tan Sha River and Kwan Tei River are major rivers in the area. The plain is fertile and suitable for farming with various villages.

== Barracks ==
The name of Kwan Tei means "military place" in Cantonese. Barracks were built here by the British Army during the colonial era. However, the history of Kwan Tei Village can be traced back to much earlier than 1898. According to the display board in Queen's Hill, the Song Dynasty army sought refuge in Xin'an County (present-day Hong Kong and Shenzhen area) to protect the last emperor Zhao Bing, and established a military village near Queen's Hill. To the west of Kwan Tei, Gailiopi Lines (新圍軍營) is located near San Wai, a walled village north of Lung Yeuk Tau. To the south, Burma Lines (皇后山軍營) is on Queen's Hill (皇后山). The Field Patrol Department of the Hong Kong Police Force is also near Queen's Hill.

== Transportation ==
Kwan Tei was served by the Kwan Tei station of the former Sha Tau Kok Railway, which was in operation from 1911 to 1928. Kwan Tei station was opened in February 1916.

Sha Tau Kok Road goes through the heart of Kwan Tei, connecting Lung Yeuk Tau and Sha Tau Kok.

== See also ==
- Ko Po Tsuen, North District
- Kwanti Racecourse
- Queen's Hill Estate
