= Tong Hang =

Village in Fanling, Hong Kong

Coordinates: 22.4920297°N 114.1475826°E

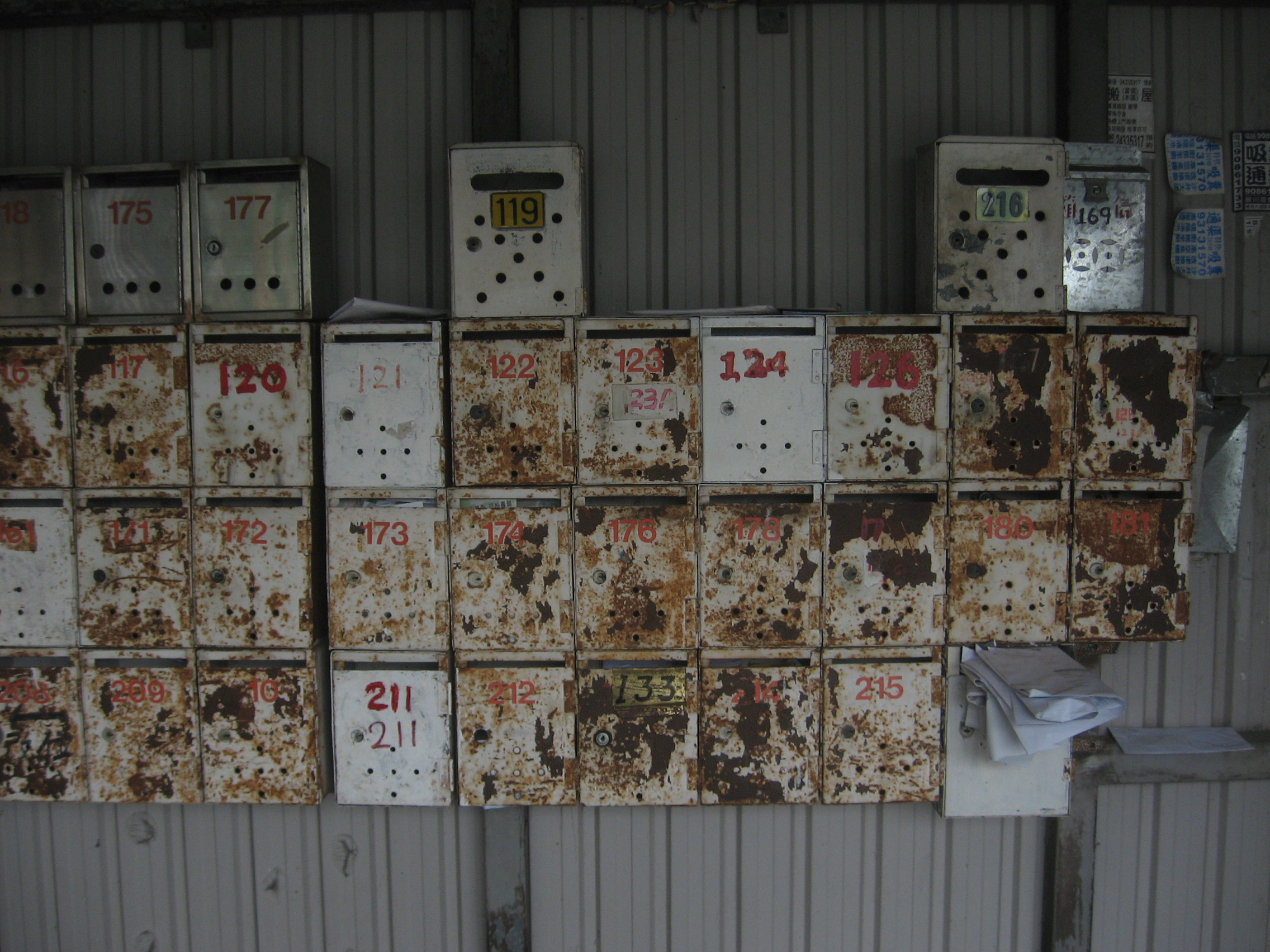
Mailboxes in Tong Hang

Tong Hang (Chinese: 塘坑) is a village in Fanling, North District, Hong Kong.

== Administration ==
Tong Hang is a recognized village under the New Territories Small House Policy. It is one of the villages represented within the Fanling District Rural Committee. For electoral purposes, Tong Hang is part of the Queen's Hill constituency, which is currently represented by Law Ting-tak.
