= Fanling =

Fanling 粉嶺
- Town
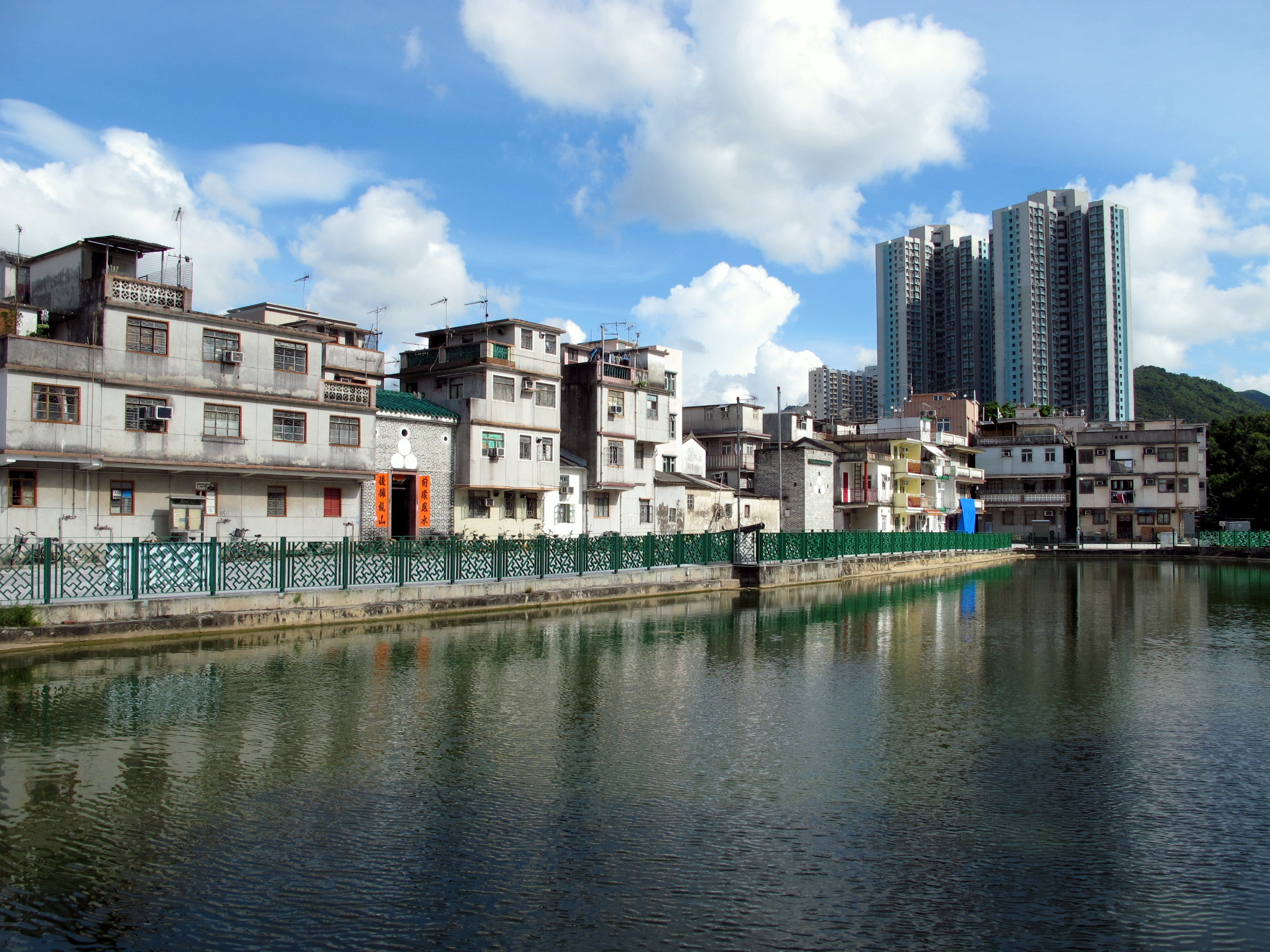
- Fanling Wai

- Location within Hong Kong
- Country: China
- SAR: Hong Kong
- Region: New Territories
- District: North District
- Time zone: UTC+8 (HKT)

Fanling
- Traditional Chinese: 粉嶺
- Simplified Chinese: 粉岭
Transcriptions
Standard Mandarin
- Hanyu Pinyin: Fénlǐng
Yue: Cantonese
- Yale Romanization: Fán Léhng
- Jyutping: Fan2 Leng5
- IPA: [fɐn˧˥.lɛŋ˩˧] ([fɐn˨˥ lɛːŋ˨˧])

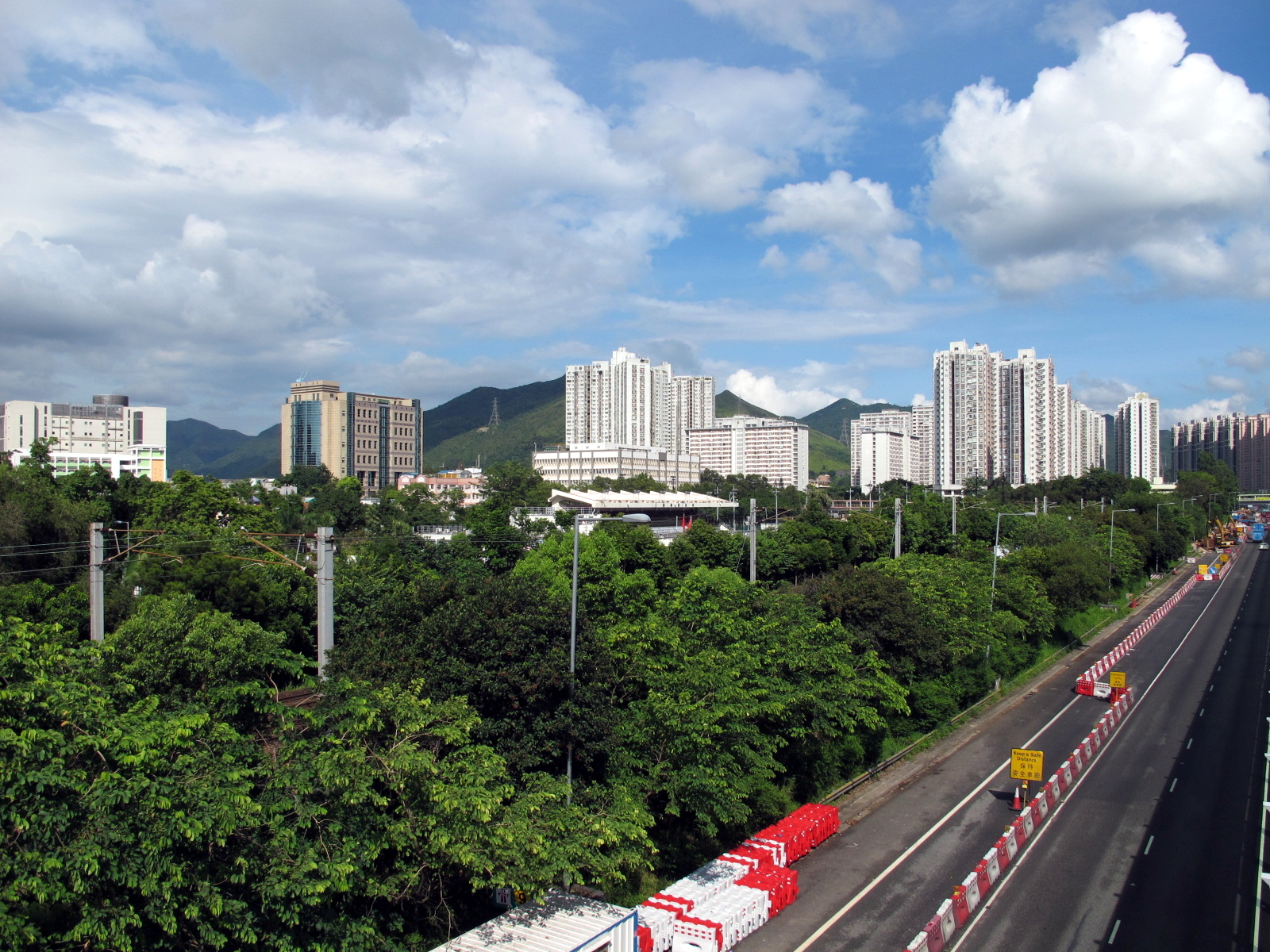
Residential area in Fanling

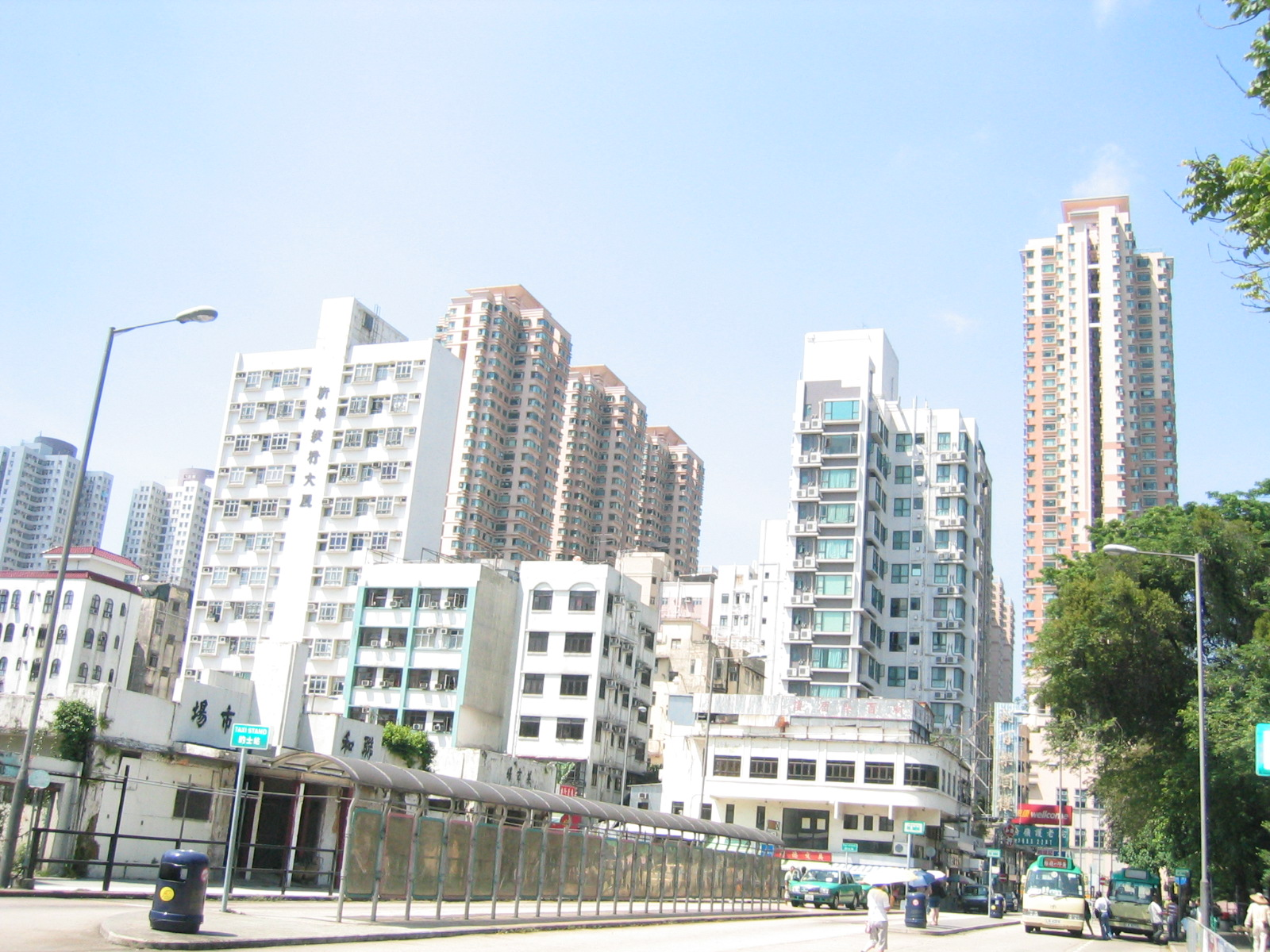
Apartment buildings in Luen Wo Hui

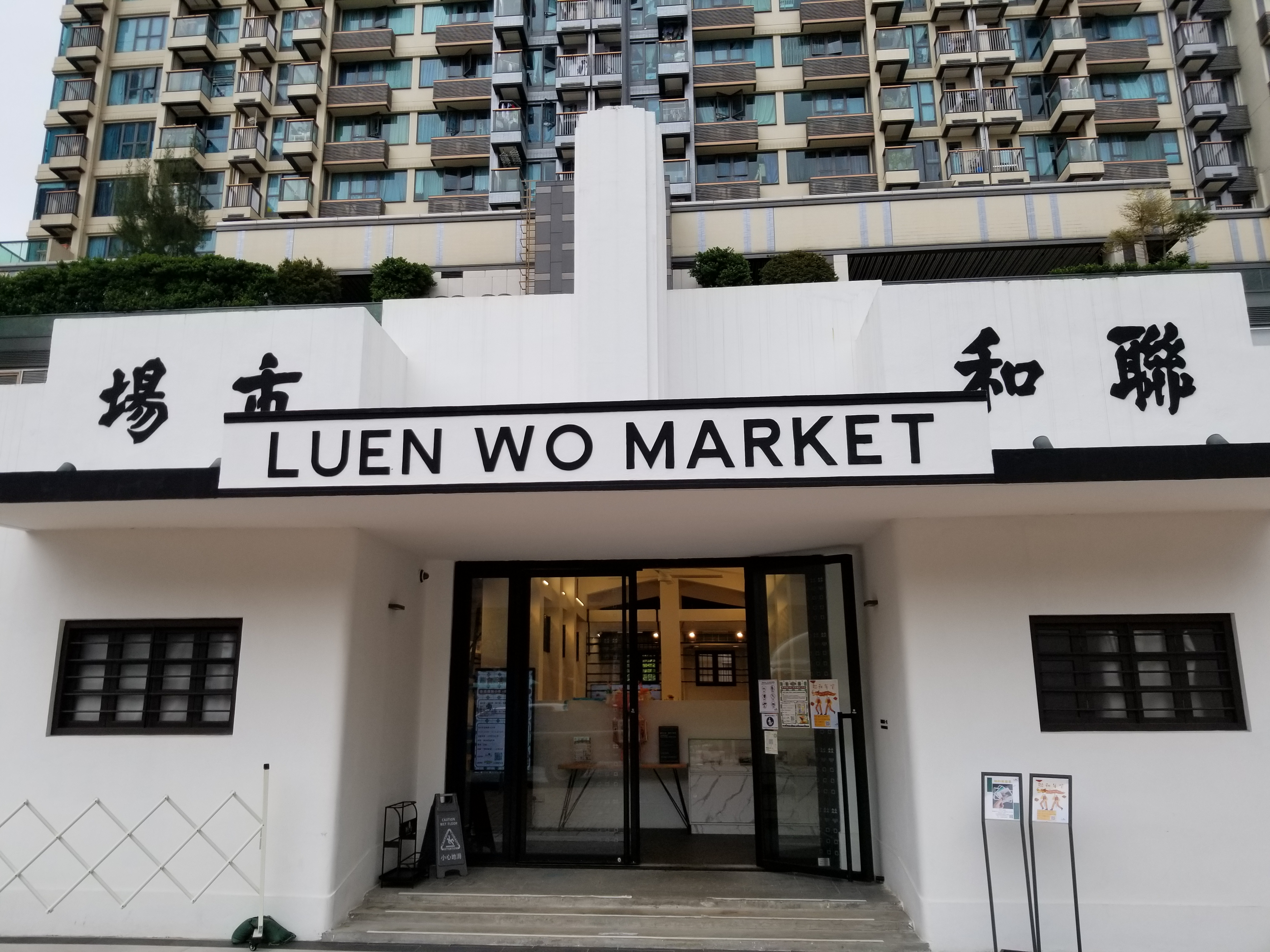
Luen Wo Market

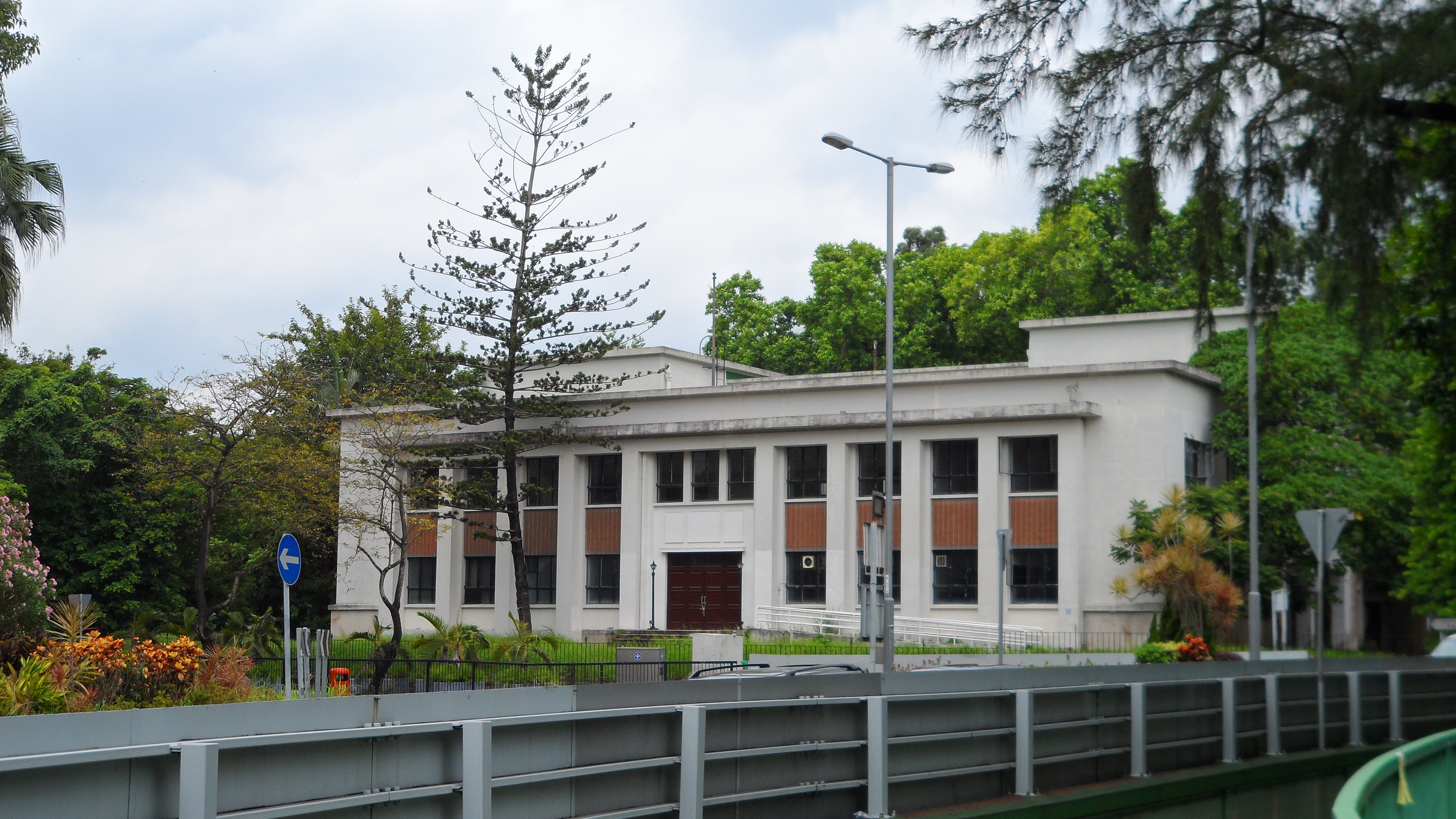
Former Fanling Magistracy

Fanling (Chinese: 粉嶺; also spelled Fan Ling or Fan Leng) is a town in New Territories East of Hong Kong. Administratively, it is part of the North District. Fanling Town is the main settlement of Fanling area. The name Fanling is a shortened form of Fan Pik Leng (粉壁嶺). The area has several public and private estates.

Northwest of Fanling is Sheung Shui and southeast is Tai Po.

== Areas ==
Part of Fanling–Sheung Shui New Town, Fanling Town includes Luen Wo Hui (聯和墟), the marketplace of Fanling before urban development in the area, and Wo Hop Shek (和合石), where an uphill public cemetery is located.

Fanling North is one of three new development areas currently being planned for North District, in parallel with Ta Kwu Ling and Kwu Tung North.

== Sights ==
- Fanling Wai (粉嶺圍), a walled village.
- Fung Ying Seen Koon (蓬瀛仙館), a Taoist temple.
- Lung Yeuk Tau Heritage Trail
- Tao Heung Foods of Mankind Museum (relocated to Fo Tan in 2008)

== Housing estates ==
Public and private housing estates in Fanling include:

- Avon Park (碧湖花園)
- Belair Monte (綠悠軒)
- Cheung Wah Estate (祥華邨)
- Cyber Domaine (數碼都域)
- Dawning Views (牽晴間)
- Fanling Centre (粉嶺中心)
- Fanling Town Centre (粉嶺名都)
- Flora Plaza (花都廣場)
- Grand Regentville (御庭軒)
- Hemma Fab (聚然)
- Regentville (帝庭軒)
- Ka Fuk Estate (嘉福邨)
- Ka Shing Court (嘉盛苑)
- King Shing Court (景盛苑)
- Wah Ming Estate (華明邨)
- Wah Sum Estate (華心邨)
- Yan Shing Court (欣盛苑)
- Yung Shing Court (雍盛苑)
- Greenpark Villa (蔚翠花園)
- Cheerful Park (欣翠花園)
- Vienna Garden (維也納花園)
- Wing Fok Centre (榮福中心)
- Wing Fai Centre (榮輝中心)
- Wah Ming Estate (華明邨)
- Union Plaza (海聯廣場)

== Villages ==
Villages in the Fanling area include:

- Fan Leng Lau (粉嶺樓)
- Fanling Wai (粉嶺圍)
- Fu Tei Pai (虎地排)
- Hok Tau Wai (鶴藪圍)
- Hung Leng (孔嶺)
- Kan Tau Tsuen (簡頭村)
- Ko Po (高莆)
- Kwai Tau Leng (龜頭嶺)
- Kwan Tei (軍地)
- Lau Shui Heung (流水响)
- Leng Pei Tsuen (嶺皮村)
- Leng Tsai (嶺仔)
- Lung Yeuk Tau (龍躍頭), including San Uk Tsuen, San Wai, Wing Ning Tsuen, Wing Ning Wai, Ma Wat Tsuen, Tung Kok Wai and Lo Wai (新屋村，新圍，永寧村，永寧圍，麻笏村，東閣圍及老圍)
- Ma Liu Shui San Tsuen (馬料水新村)
- Ma Mei Ha (馬尾下)
- Ma Mei Ha, Leng Tsui (馬尾下嶺咀)
- Ma Liu Shui San Tsuen (馬料水新村)
- Ma Wat Tsuen (麻笏村)
- Ma Wat Wai (麻笏圍)
- On Lok Tsuen (安樂村)
- San Tong Po (新塘莆)
- San Uk Tsai (新屋仔)
- Shung Him Tong Tsuen (崇謙堂村)
- Tong Hang (塘坑)
- Siu Hang San Tsuen (小坑新村)
- Siu Hang Tsuen (小坑村)
- Sze Tau Leng (獅頭嶺)
- Tan Chuk Hang (丹竹坑)
- Tsz Tong Tsuen (祠堂村)
- Wa Mei Shan (畫眉山)
- Wo Hop Shek (和合石)

== Education ==
Fanling is in Primary One Admission (POA) School Net 81. Within the school net are multiple aided schools (operated independently but funded with government money); no government schools are in the net.

Schools in Fanling:

- Fanling Public School (aided school)

Hong Kong Public Libraries operates Fanling Public Library and Fanling South Public Library, the latter in Dawning Views Shopping Plaza.

== Transport ==
Fanling is served by:

- Route 9
- Fanling station in Fanling Town
- Bus routes
