= On Lok Tsuen =

Area in Fanling, Hong Kong

Coordinates: 22.496339°N 114.144159°E

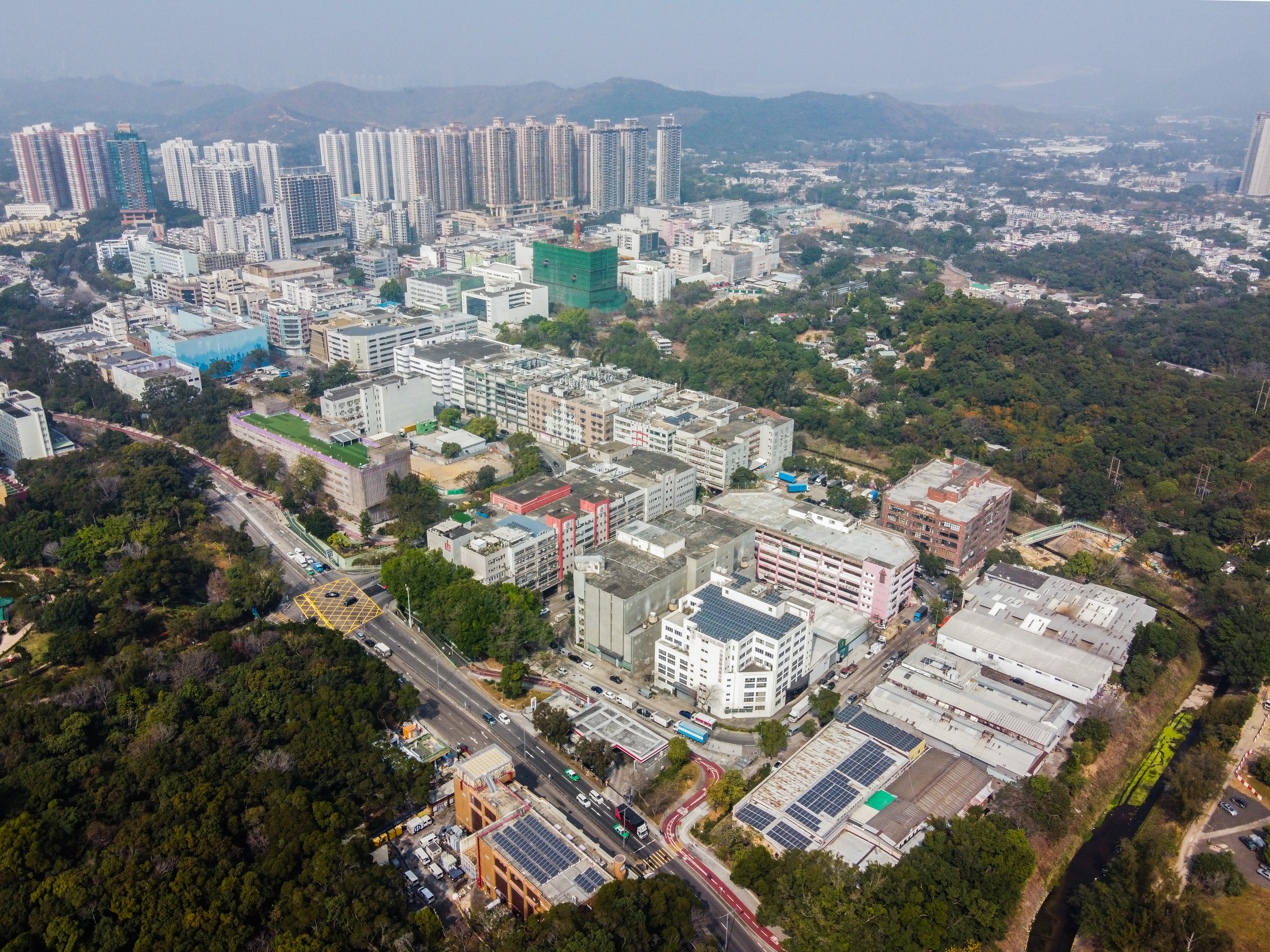
On Lok Tsuen Industrial Area

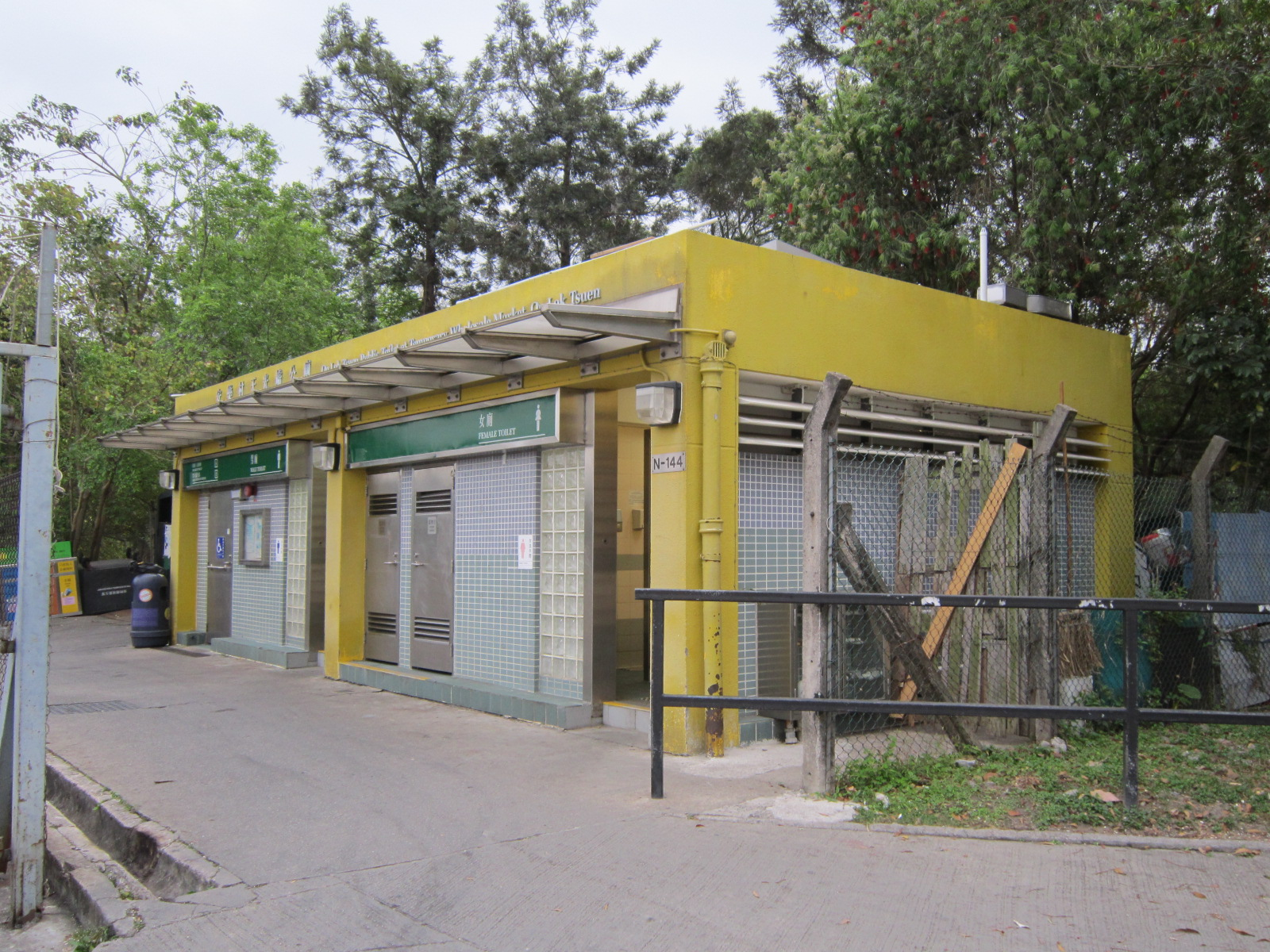
Public toilet in On Lok Tsuen

On Lok Tsuen (Chinese: 安樂村) is a village and industrial area in Fanling, North District, Hong Kong.

== Administration ==
On Lok Tsuen is one of the villages represented within the Fanling District Rural Committee. For electoral purposes, On Lok Tsuen is part of the Fanling Town constituency, which is currently represented by Wong Hoi-ying.
