= Fanling Public School =

Primary school in Hong Kong

Coordinates: 22.4973°N 114.1372°E

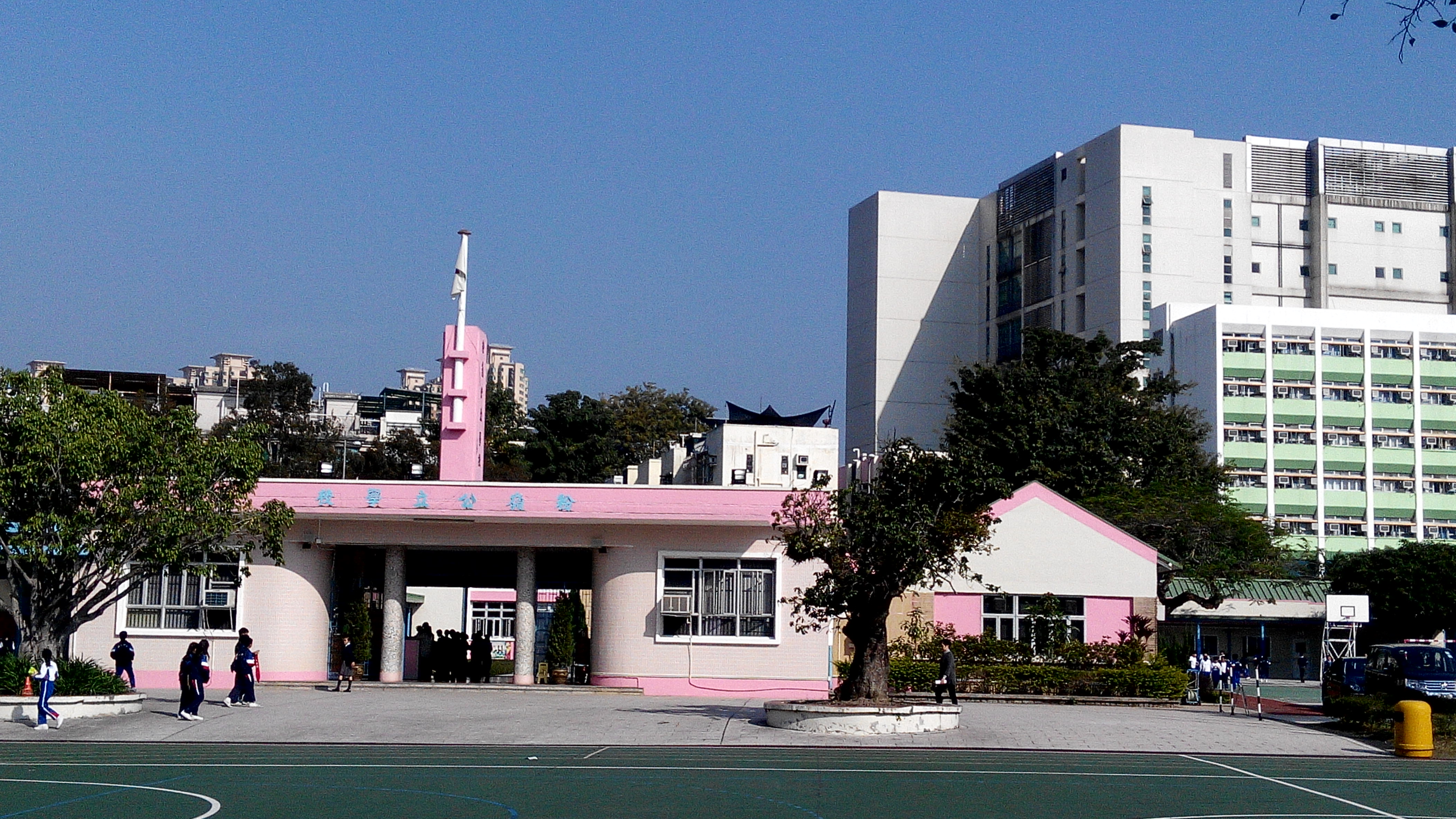
Fanling Public School in 2015

Fanling Public School (Chinese: 粉嶺公立學校), a government-funded primary school, was founded in 1936. Located in Fanling, North District, New Territories, Hong Kong, it is in Fanling Village (or Fanling Wai) near MTR Fanling station.

== History ==
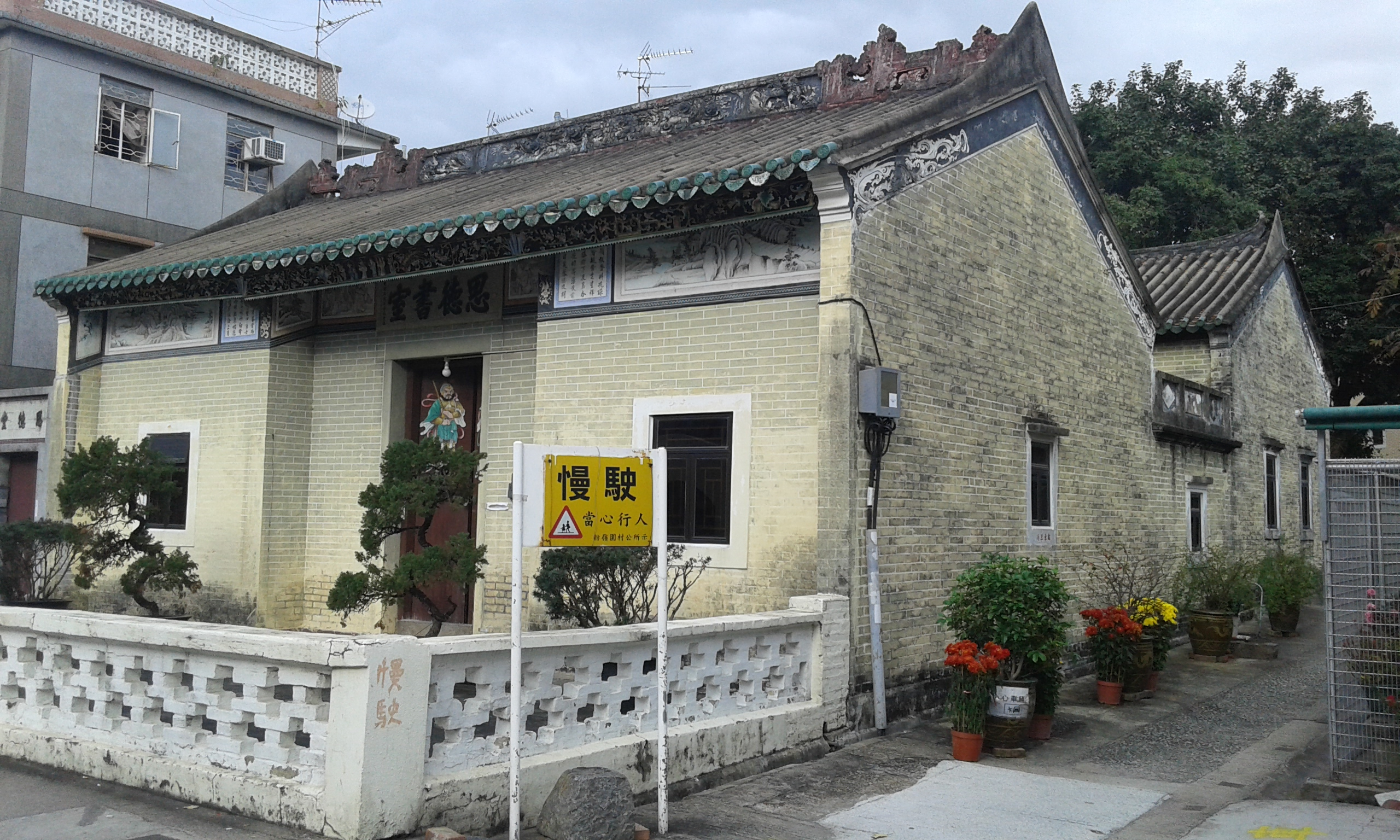
Tsz Tak Study Hall.

=== Establishment ===
The school was located nearby as the Tsz Tak Study Hall (思德書室) in Fanling Nam Wai built in 1846. It provided education for the village children, with 20 to 30 children being taught there. In 1936, it housed the government subsidized Fanling Public School. Its function as a school ceased in 1957, when a separate school complex was constructed to its north-east. The hall is also used for ancestral worship of the Sze-yan lineage.

=== Key milestones ===
- 1941: School was suspended due to war.
- 1945 Summer: School resumes after war ended. School term begins in Autumn instead of Spring. At that time there were around 100 pupils.
- 1955: Fanling population increase, and the school received many non-villager applications. School management called a village general meeting and decided to build a new school. The motion was receiving the support from villagers and the support from the Hong Kong governor at that time.
- 1957 Spring: New 12,000 square metres campus established and the school moved in. In the autumn term started in September, the school expanded from 10 classes to 20, by providing morning and afternoon shifts.
- 1962: Total classes increased from 20 to 26 (13 each for morning and afternoon respectively). At that time it's regarded as a big school in the New Territeries.
- 1971: Expanded with 3 new classrooms.
- 1986: Celebrating 50 years anniversary.
- 1997: School expanded to totally 24 classes again (12 morning + 12 afternoon).
- 1999: Central library and PTA (Parent-Teacher's association) established.
- 2000: New wing was established. The school was selected as one of the 18 "IT in Education Centre of Excellence (CoE) " in Hong Kong.
- 2002: Air conditioners installed in all classrooms.
- 2003: Primary 1 switched to all day school.
- 2005: "3rd generation sport ground" launched.
- 2008: Whole P.1-P.6 switched to all day school.
- 2012: 75 years anniversary.
- 2014: 3 new classrooms were built, school expanded to 17 classes.

== Facility ==
Its total area is about 11,000 square meters. There are 18 classrooms, an auditorium, and four special rooms for teaching purposes: a computerized central library, music and dance room, a multimedia computer room, and an activity room. It has a football field, a basketball court, a mini tennis and volleyball court, athletics tracks, long jump sand pit, and a planted garden.

The school motto is diligence, honesty, courtesy, and love.
