= Kwanti Racecourse =

Racecourse in Hong Kong

Coordinates: 22.507580°N 114.150828°E

Kwanti Racecourse was a racecourse in Kwan Tei, in the northern New Territories of Hong Kong, which was active from 1926 to 1950. It was managed by the Fanling Hunt and Race Club.

On September 5, 1940, a Junkers Ju 86 (M-213) of Manchukuo Airlines (MKK) made an emergency landing at the racecourse during a passenger flight from Taihoku to Canton due to engine trouble. All 3 occupants were injured, one seriously. The plane was written off. The following day, an unspecified aircraft of Nippon Airways on the same route flew into trees nearby attempting the same after another engine failure, and was too written off.
