= Hok Tau Wai =

Village in Fanling, Hong Kong

Coordinates: 22.501323°N 114.174216°E

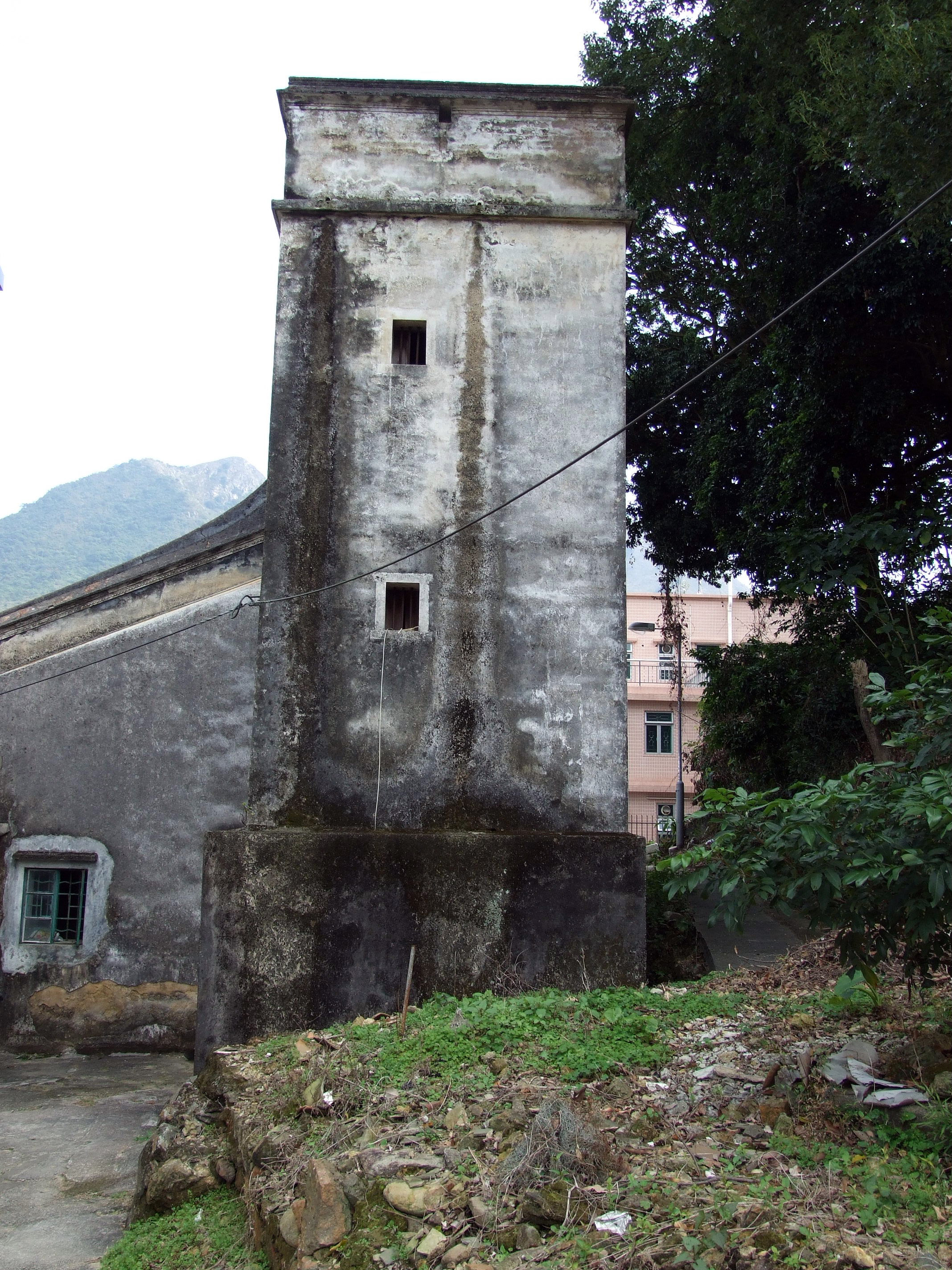
Watchtower in Hok Tau Wai.

Hok Tau Wai (Chinese: 鶴藪圍) is a village in Fanling, in the North District of the New Territories of Hong Kong.

== Administration ==
Hok Tau Wai is a recognized village under the New Territories Small House Policy. It is one of the villages represented within the Fanling District Rural Committee. For electoral purposes, Hok Tau Wai is part of the Queen's Hill constituency, which is currently represented by Law Ting-tak.
