= Ma Liu Shui San Tsuen =

Village in Fanling, Hong Kong

Coordinates: 22.505196°N 114.155569°E

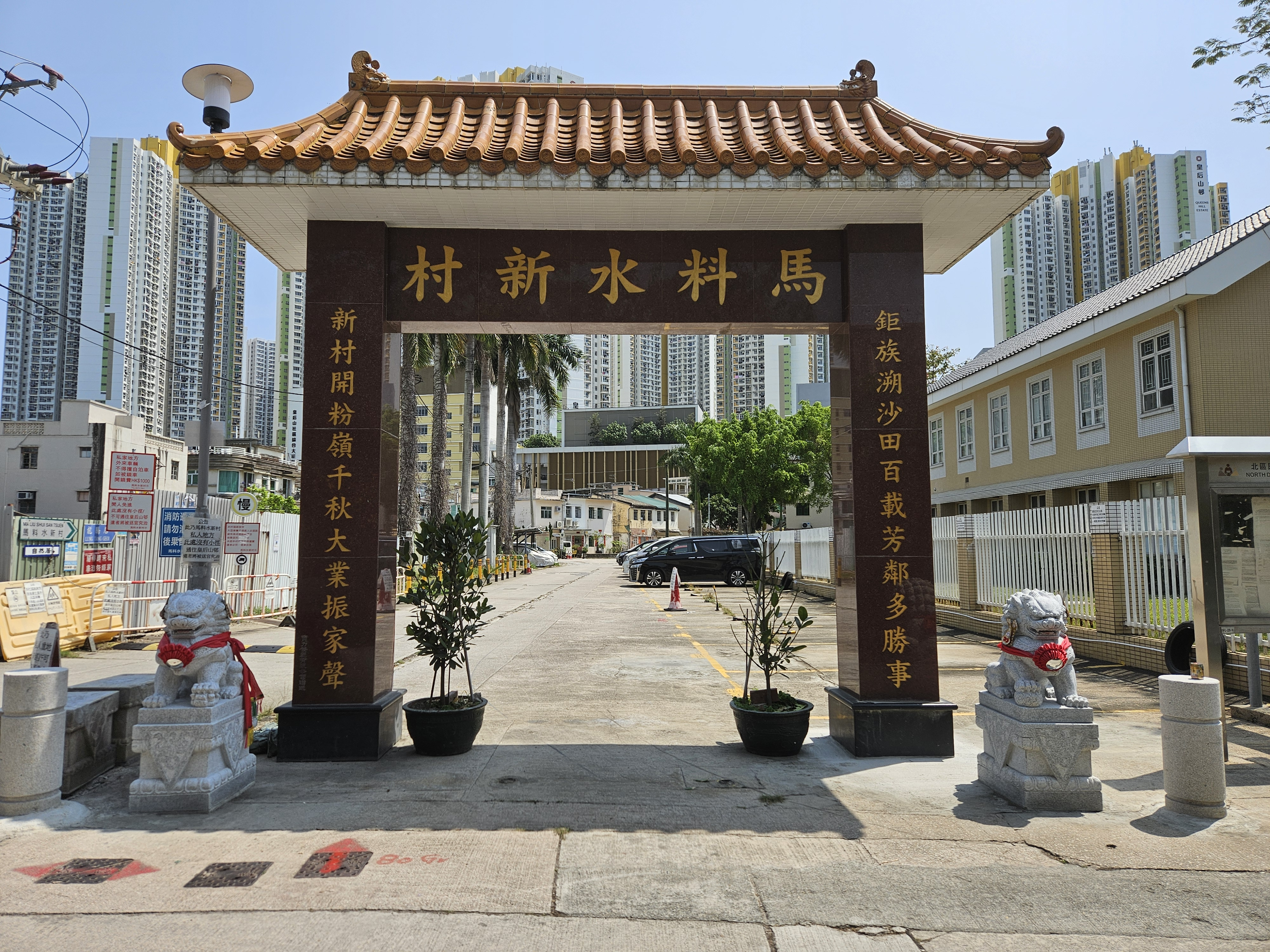
Paifang of Ma Liu Shui San Tsuen.

Ma Liu Shui San Tsuen (Chinese: 馬料水新村), sometimes transliterated as Ma Niu Shui San Tsuen, is a village in Fanling, North District, Hong Kong.

== Administration ==
Ma Liu Shui San Tsuen is a recognized village under the New Territories Small House Policy.
