= San Tong Po =

Village in Fanling, Hong Kong

Coordinates: 22.507535°N 114.166779°E

San Tong Po (Chinese: 新塘莆) is a village in Fanling, North District, Hong Kong.

== Administration ==
San Tong Po is a recognized village under the New Territories Small House Policy.

== History ==
At the time of the 1911 census, the population of San Tong Po was 47. The number of males was 15.
