= Fanling Wai =

Coordinates: 22.4975°N 114.1353°E

Fanling Wai 粉嶺圍
- Walled village
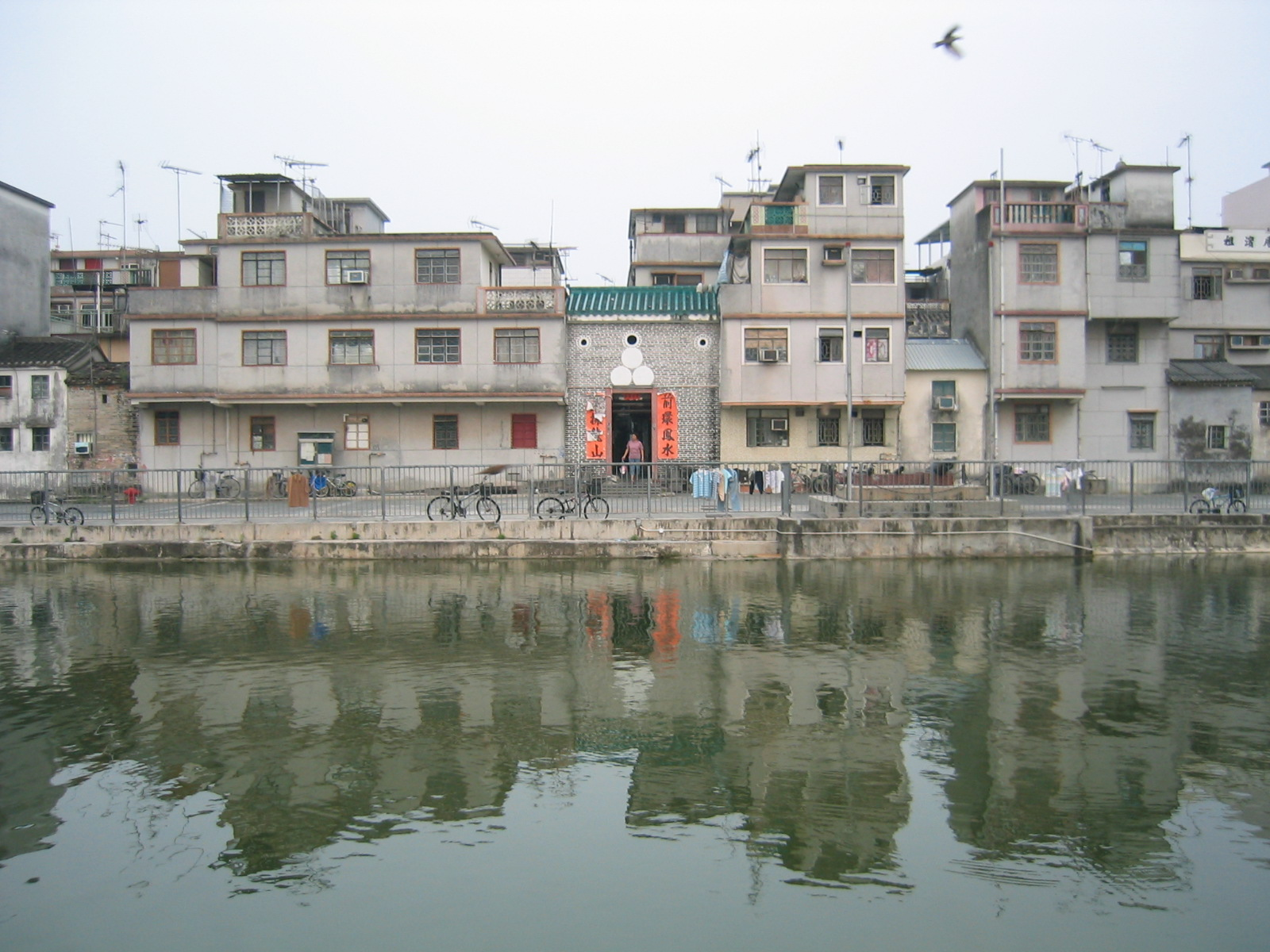
- External view of Fanling Ching Wai with pond.
- Interactive map of Fanling Wai
- Country: Hong Kong
- District: North
- Suburb: Fanling
- Established: 1572–1620
- Founder: Pang Clan

Fanling Wai
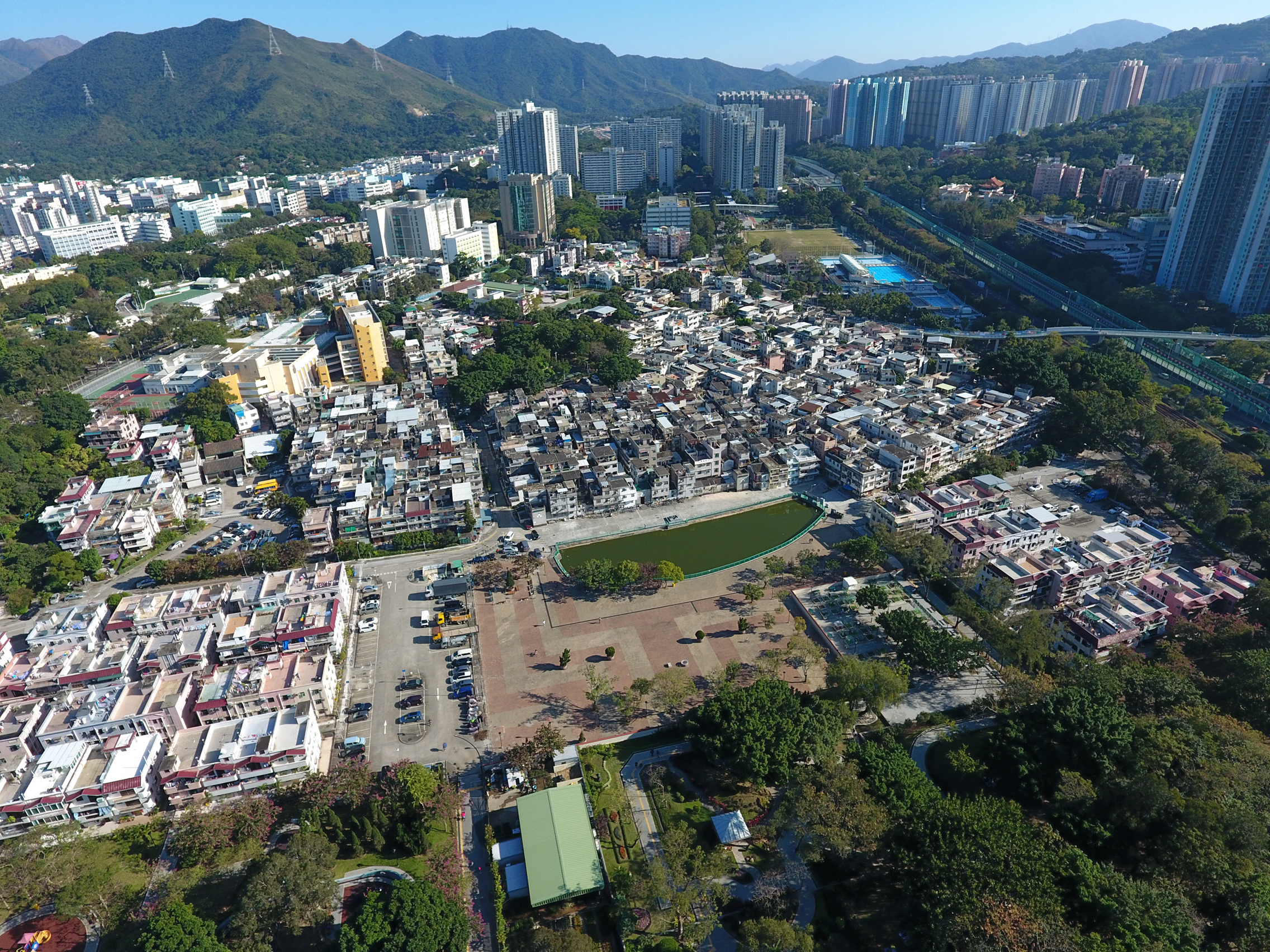
- Aerial view of Fanling Wai
- Traditional Chinese: 粉嶺圍
Transcriptions
Yue: Cantonese
- Yale Romanization: Fán léhng wàih
- Jyutping: Fan2 leng5 wai4

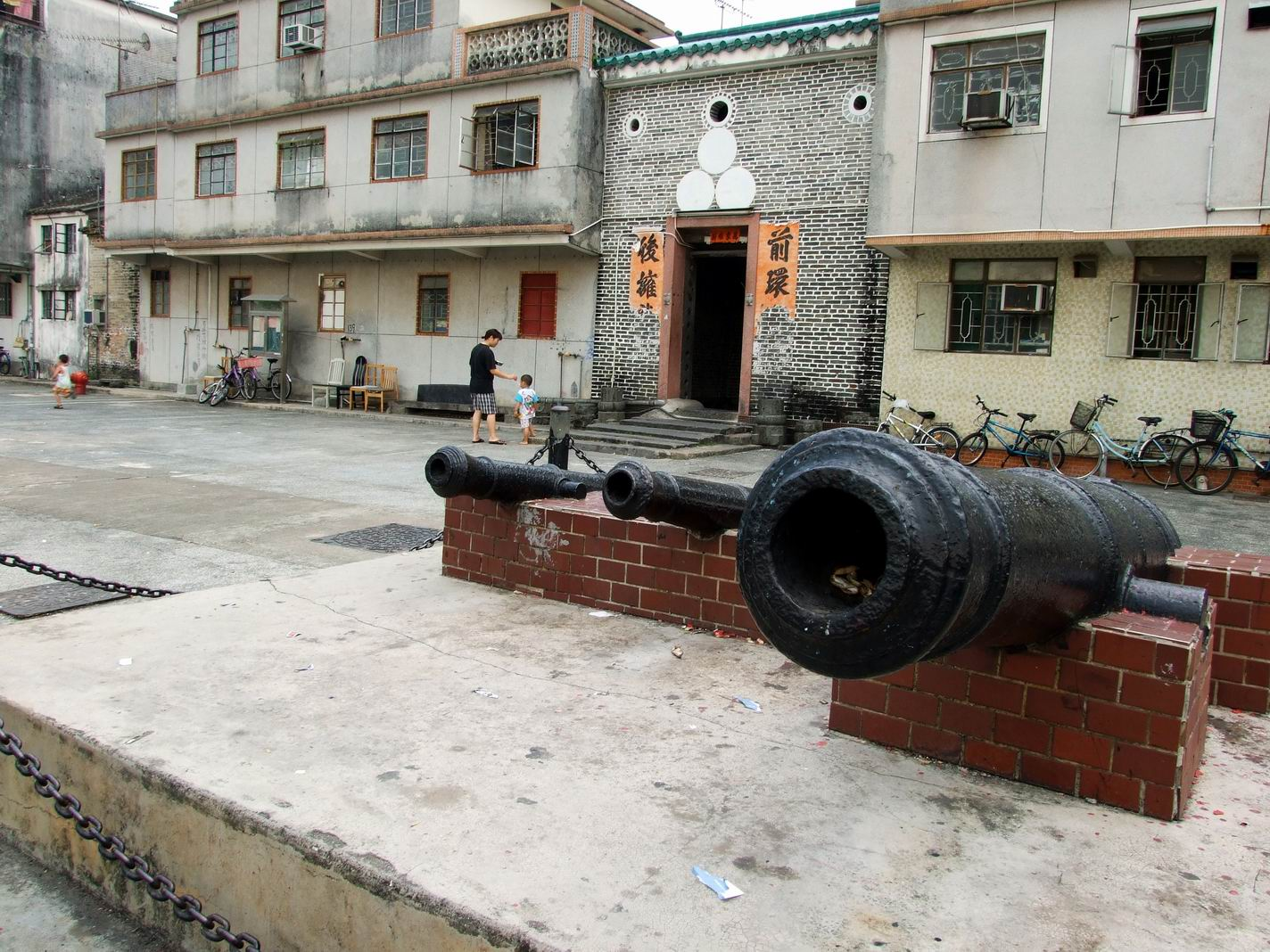
Cannons near the entrance gate-tower of Fanling Ching Wai.

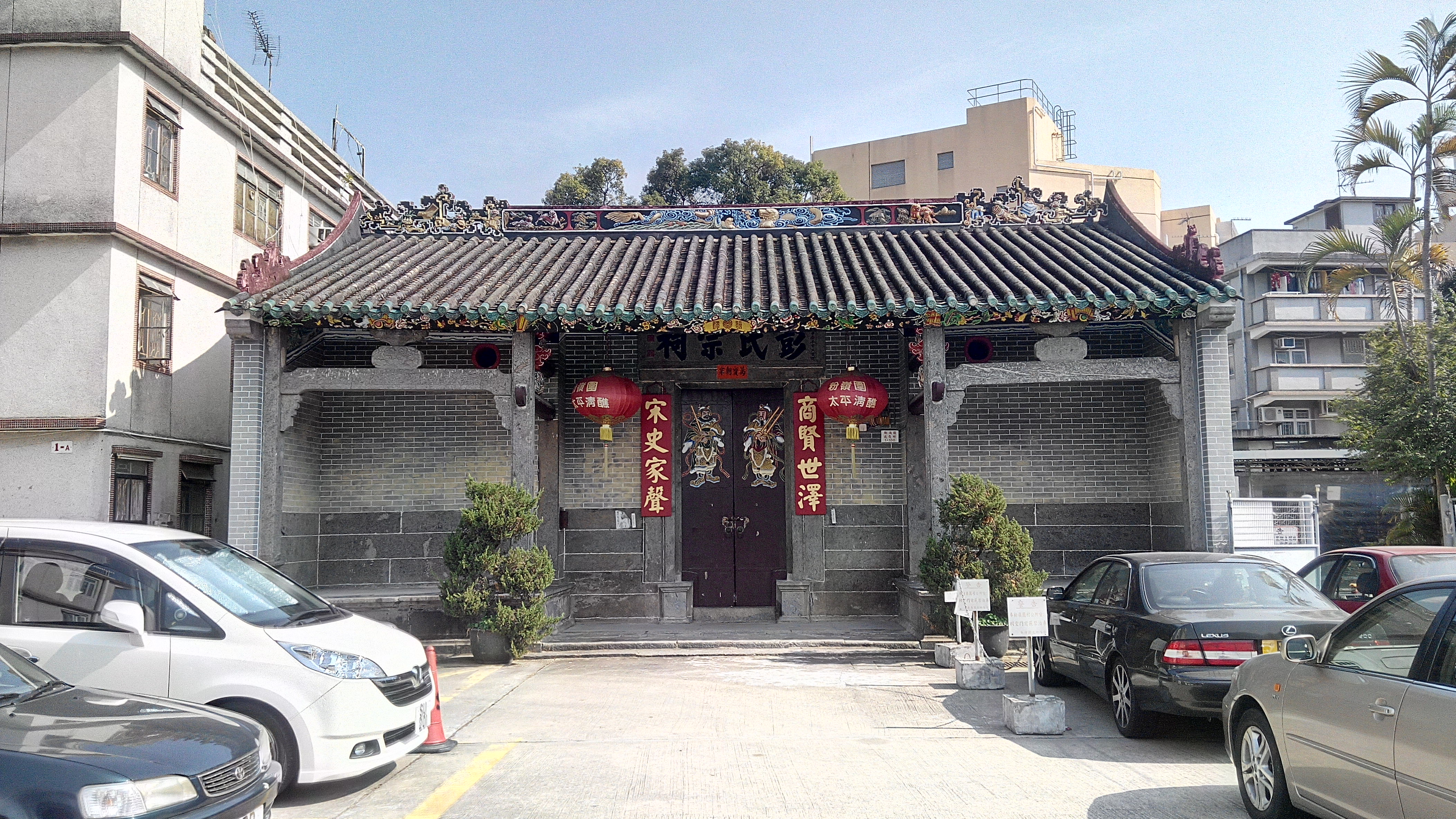
Pang Ancestral Hall in Fanling Pak Wai.

Fanling Wai is a village in Fanling, North District, Hong Kong, built by the Pang (彭) Clan. It is composed of a walled village and its two extensions: Ching Wai or Chung Wai (正圍 or 中圍; 'central hamlet') – the only walled hamlet of Fanling Wai and also the first hamlet to be built, Pak Wai (北圍; 'north hamlet'), and Nam Wai (南圍; 'south hamlet').

== History ==
Fanling Wai is the centre of the Pang Clan, who arrived in Hong Kong during the Southern Song dynasty (1127-1279). The wai (walled village) was constructed in the early part of the Wanli (1572–1620) reign of the Ming dynasty.

The ancestors of the Pang Clan of Fanling Wai were settled in Gansu province, in China, and moved to Jishui County in Jiangxi province in 739, and later, during the Northern Song dynasty (960- 1127), they moved successively to Chaozhou and Dongguan. Pang Kwei (彭桂), the founding ancestor of the Pang Clan, moved from Dongguan to Lung Shan (龍山), now known as Lung Yeuk Tau of Fanling, in 1190. He then moved to Fan Leng Lau in 1220 and established a village over there. As the population of the clan increased, they moved westward to settle in Fanling Wai and other places.

== Features ==
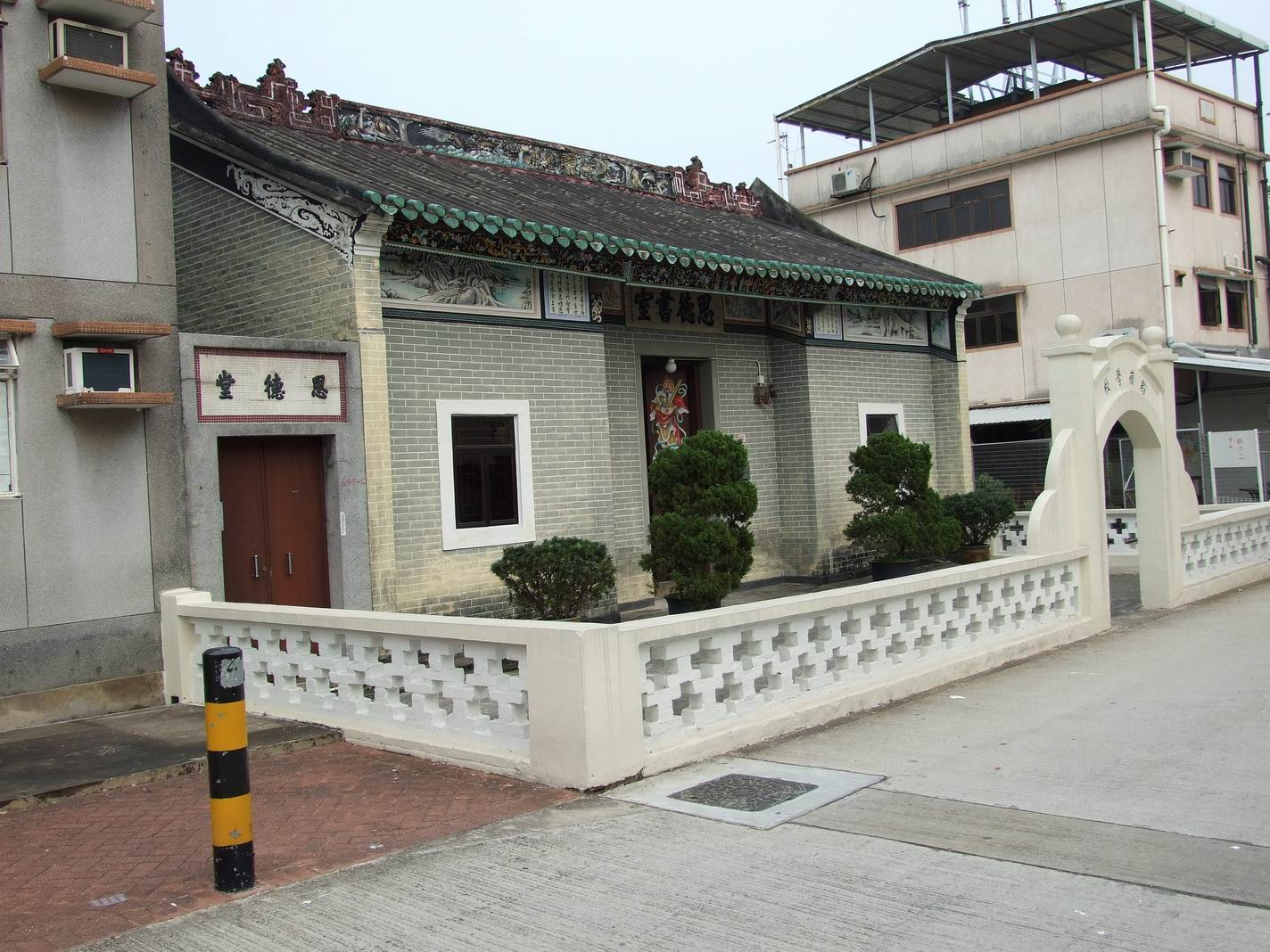
Tsz Tak Study Hall in Fanling Nam Wai.

Fanling Chung Wai is recognisable with the distinctive pond and layout including features such as cannons and watchtowers. All these elements were crafted to form an integral part of the village setting. The entrance is at the central axis of the walled village with village houses built connected to the walls and seven rows on the left and right of the central axis. Three circular gun holes are on the façade wall of the entrance gate-tower with three painted white circles for feng shui reasons. The cannons of Fanling Wai were buried during the Japanese occupation of Hong Kong (1941–1945), and were only excavated in 1986. They are now on display on a cement platform in front of the walled settlement.

The Pang Ancestral Hall (彭氏宗祠), also called Tai Tak Tong (大德堂), is located in Fanling Pak Wai. It was moved to the present site in 1846 due to feng shui reasons. It was rebuilt in 1884.

The Tsz Tak Study Hall (思德書室) in Fanling Nam Wai was built in 1846. It provided education for the village children, with 20 to 30 children being taught there. In 1936, it housed the government subsidized Fanling Public School. Its function as a school ceased in 1957, when a separate school complex was constructed to its north-east. The hall is also used for ancestral worship of the Sze-yan lineage.

A Sam Shing Temple (三聖宮), dedicated to Pak Tai, Kwan Tai and Man Cheong (文昌), was erected by the Pang clan in the area. It was moved to its present location, west of Ling Hill (靈山) and along Jockey Club Road, in 1948.

== Conservation ==
The entrance gate-tower, together with the southwest and northwest watchtowers of Fanling Chung Wai are Grade III historic buildings. They were rebuilt in 1986. The Pang Ancestral Hall is a Grade I historic building, while the Tsz Tak Study Hall is a Grade II historic building and the Sam Shing Temple is a Grade III historic building.
