= Kwan Tei River =

River in the New Territories, Hong Kong

- Traditional Chinese: 軍地河
- Cantonese Yale: gwān deih hòh
Transcriptions
Yue: Cantonese
- Yale Romanization: gwān deih hòh
- Jyutping: gwan1 dei6 ho4

The Kwan Tei River (Chinese: 軍地河) is a river in the northeastern New Territories, Hong Kong. Its primary source is the Lau Shui Heung Reservoir. The river flows through Lau Shui Heung Village and underneath Sha Tau Kok Road before joining the Ng Tung River near Kwan Tei Pei Village.

== See also ==
- List of rivers and nullahs in Hong Kong
