= Ko Po Tsuen, North District =

Village in Fanling, Hong Kong

Coordinates: 22.510810°N 114.167591°E

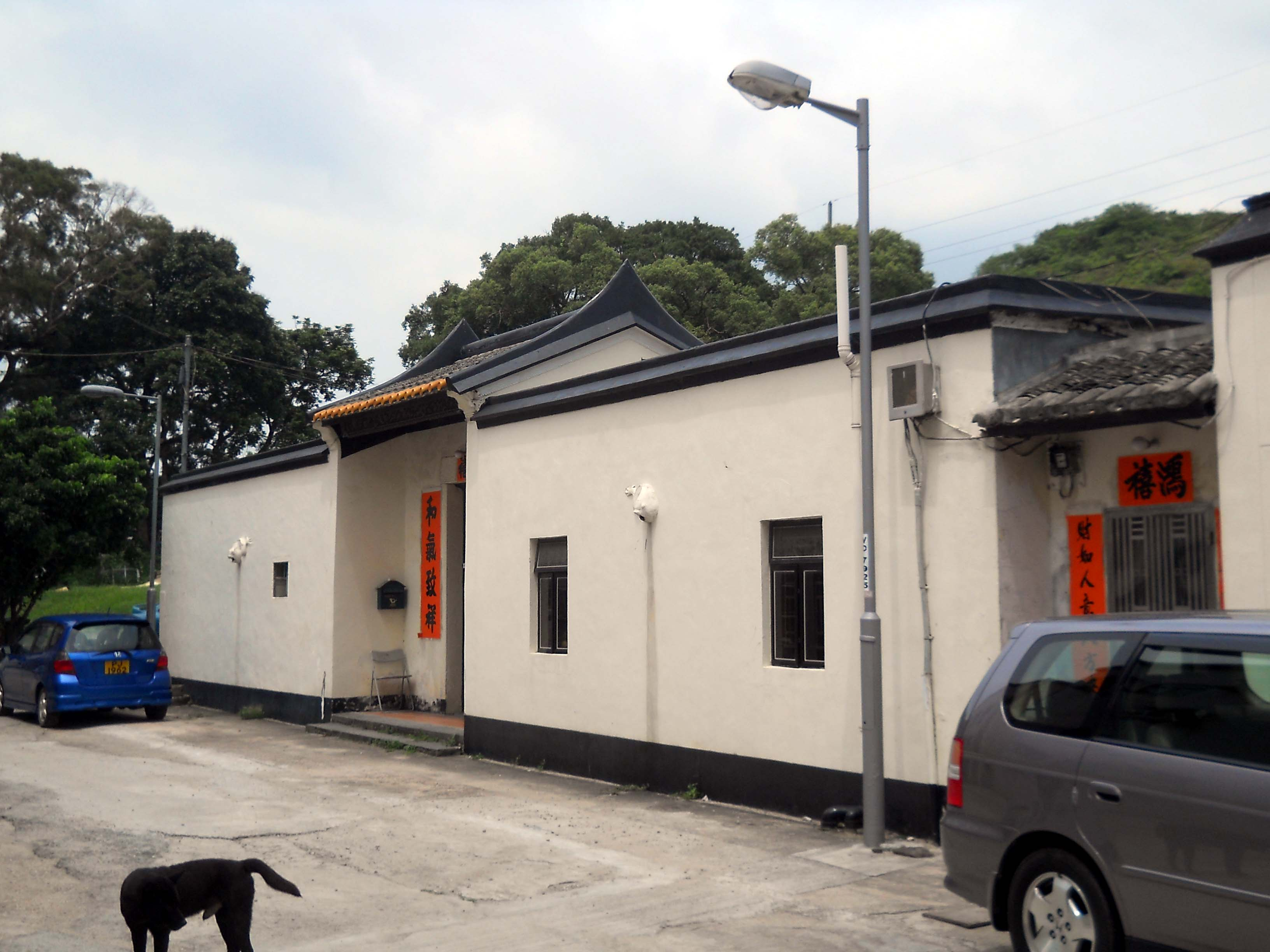
Village houses in Ko Po Tsuen.

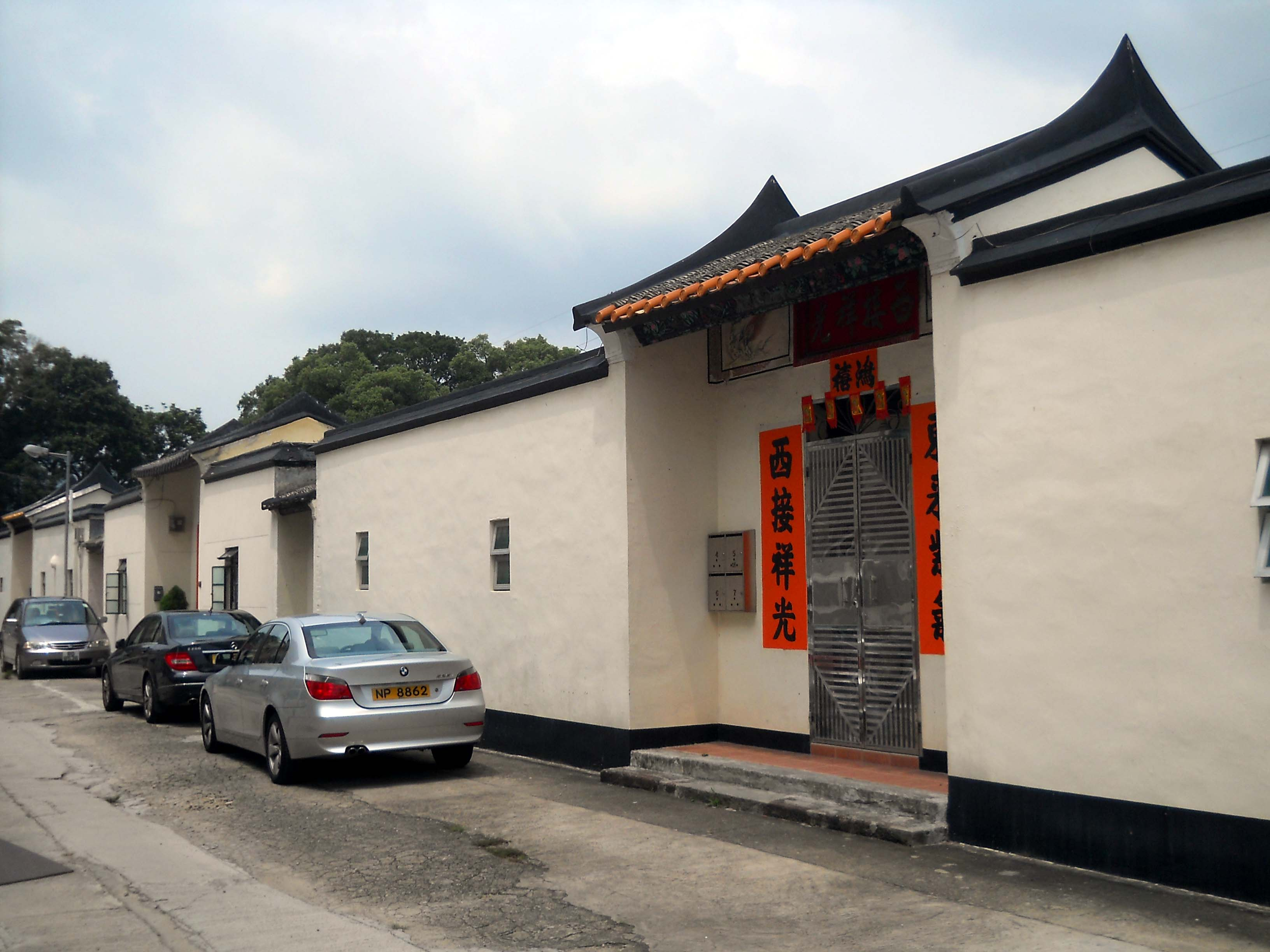
Village houses in Ko Po Tsuen.

Ko Po Tsuen or Ko Po Village (Chinese: 高埔村) is a village in Kwan Tei, Fanling, North District, Hong Kong.

== Administration ==
Ko Po is a recognized village under the New Territories Small House Policy. Ko Po Tsuen is one of the villages represented within the Fanling District Rural Committee. For electoral purposes, Ko Po Tsuen is part of the Queen's Hill constituency, which is currently represented by Law Ting-tak.
