= Ko Po Tsuen, Yuen Long District =

Village in Hong Kong

Coordinates: 22.440988°N 114.056382°E

Ko Po Tsuen (Chinese: 高埔村) is a village in the Kam Tin area of Yuen Long District, Hong Kong.

== Administration ==
Ko Po is a recognized village under the New Territories Small House Policy. Ko Po Tsuen is one of the villages represented within the Kam Tin Rural Committee. For electoral purposes, Ko Po Tsuen is part of the Kam Tin constituency, which is currently represented by Chris Li Chung-chi.
