= Fanling Town (constituency) =

- Elected constituency for the North District Council
- Boundary of Fanling Town in North District
- District: North
- Legislative Council constituency: New Territories North
- Population: 15,211 (2019)
- Electorate: 6,798 (2019)

Current constituency
- Created: 1994
- Number of members: One
- Member: vacant

Fanling Town (Chinese: 粉嶺市) is one of the 18 constituencies in the North District, Hong Kong.

The constituency returns one district councillor to the North District Council, with an election every four years.

Fanling Town constituency has an estimated population of 15,211.

== Councillors represented ==
Election	Member	Party
1994	Pang Kwan-cheong	Nonpartisan
1999	Pang Hang-yin	Nonpartisan
2003	Ip Mei-ho	Nonpartisan
2011	George Pang Chun-sing	DAB
201?	George Pang Chun-sing	Nonpartisan
2019	Wong Hoi-ying→vacant	Democratic

== Election results ==
=== 2010s ===
North District Council Election, 2019: Fanling Town
Party	Candidate	Votes	%	±%
Democratic	Wong Hoi-ying	2,761	56.57	
Independent	George Pang Chun-sing	1,830	37.49	
Nonpartisan	Chris Yip Yiu-shing	290	5.94	
Majority		931	19.08	
Turnout		4,905	72.17	
Democratic gain from Independent		Swing		
