= Public housing estates in Fanling =

The following is a list of public housing estates in Fanling Town, Hong Kong, including Home Ownership Scheme (HOS), Private Sector Participation Scheme (PSPS), Sandwich Class Housing Scheme (SCHS), Flat-for-Sale Scheme (FFSS), and Tenants Purchase Scheme (TPS) estates.

== Overview ==
| Name | | Type | Inaug. | No Blocks | No Units | Notes |
| Cheong Shing Court | 昌盛苑 | HOS | 2000 | 3 | 1,280 | |
| Cheung Wah Estate | 祥華邨 | TPS | 1984 | 10 | 2,471 | |
| Fai Ming Estate | 暉明邨 | Public | 2019 | 2 | 938 | |
| Ka Fuk Estate | 嘉福邨 | Public | 1994 | 3 | 2,045 | |
| Ka Shing Court | 嘉盛苑 | HOS | 1995 | 4 | 2,432 | |
| King Shing Court | 景盛苑 | HOS | 1995 | 4 | 2,432 | |
| Shan Lai Court | 山麗苑 | HOS | 2021 | 6 | 3,222 | |
| Queen's Hill Estate | 皇后山邨 | Public | 2021 | 7 | 8,865 | |
| Wah Ming Estate | 華明邨 | TPS | 1990 | 7 | 2,476 | |
| Wah Sum Estate | 華心邨 | Public | 1995 | 2 | 1,481 | |
| Wing Fai Centre | 榮輝中心 | PSPS | 1996 | 4 | 1,350 | |
| Wing Fok Centre | 榮福中心 | PSPS | 1994 | 6 | 1,680 | |
| Yan Shing Court | 欣盛苑 | HOS | 1993 | 7 | 2,450 | |
| Yung Shing Court | 雍盛苑 | Public/HOS | 2000 | 3 | 2,500 | |

== Estates ==
=== Cheong Shing Court ===
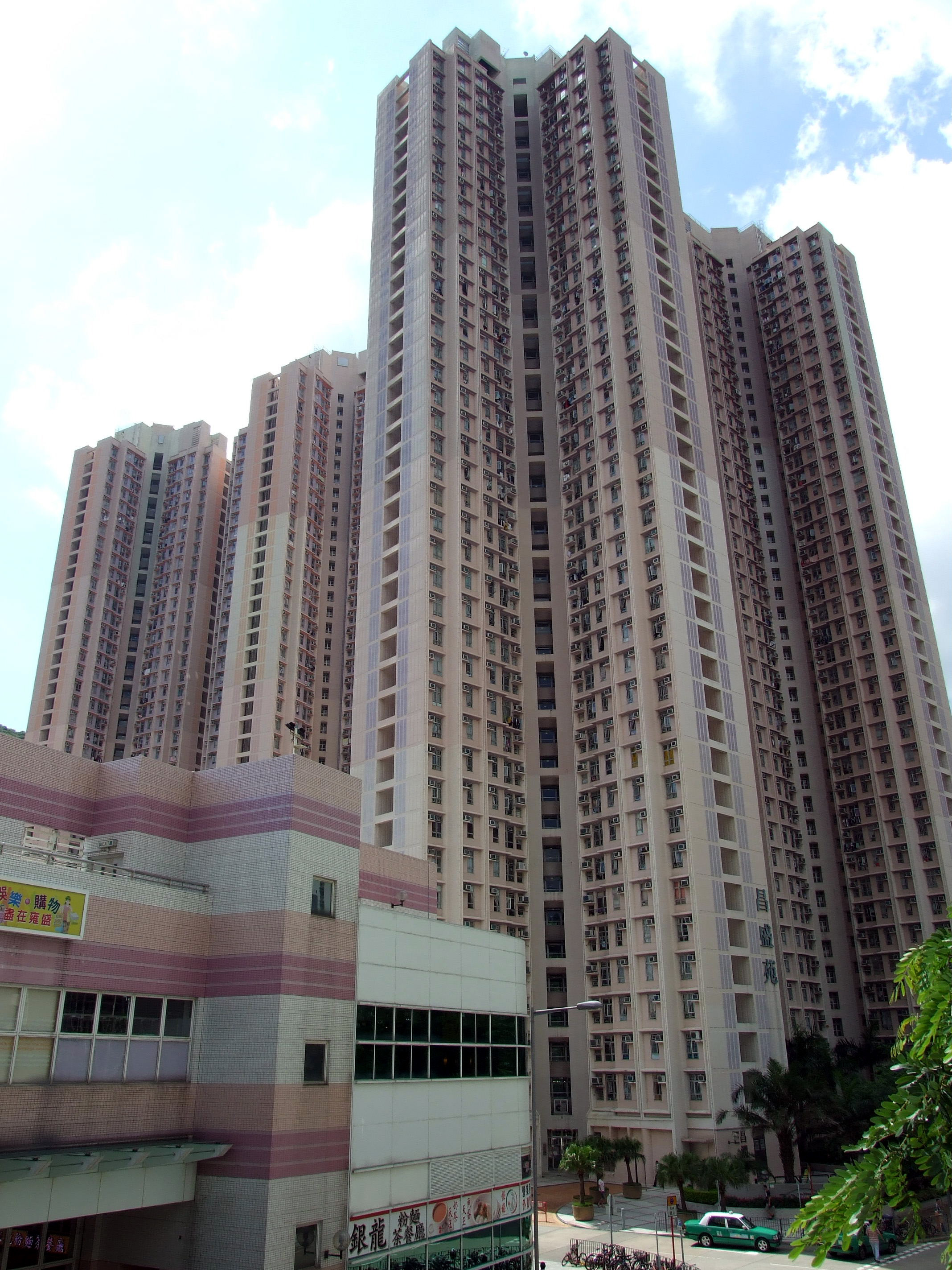
Cheong Shing Court

Cheong Shing Court is an HOS housing estate in Fanling Town, near Wah Ming Estate and Yung Shing Court. It has 3 blocks built in 2000.

| Name | Type | Completion |
|---|---|---|
| Cheong Ching House (Block A) | Concord 1 | 2000 |
| Cheong Siu House (Block B) | Concord 1 | 2000 |
| Cheong To House (Block C) | Concord 1 | 2000 |
| Cheong Yun House (Block D) | Concord 1 | 2000 |

=== Cheung Wah Estate ===
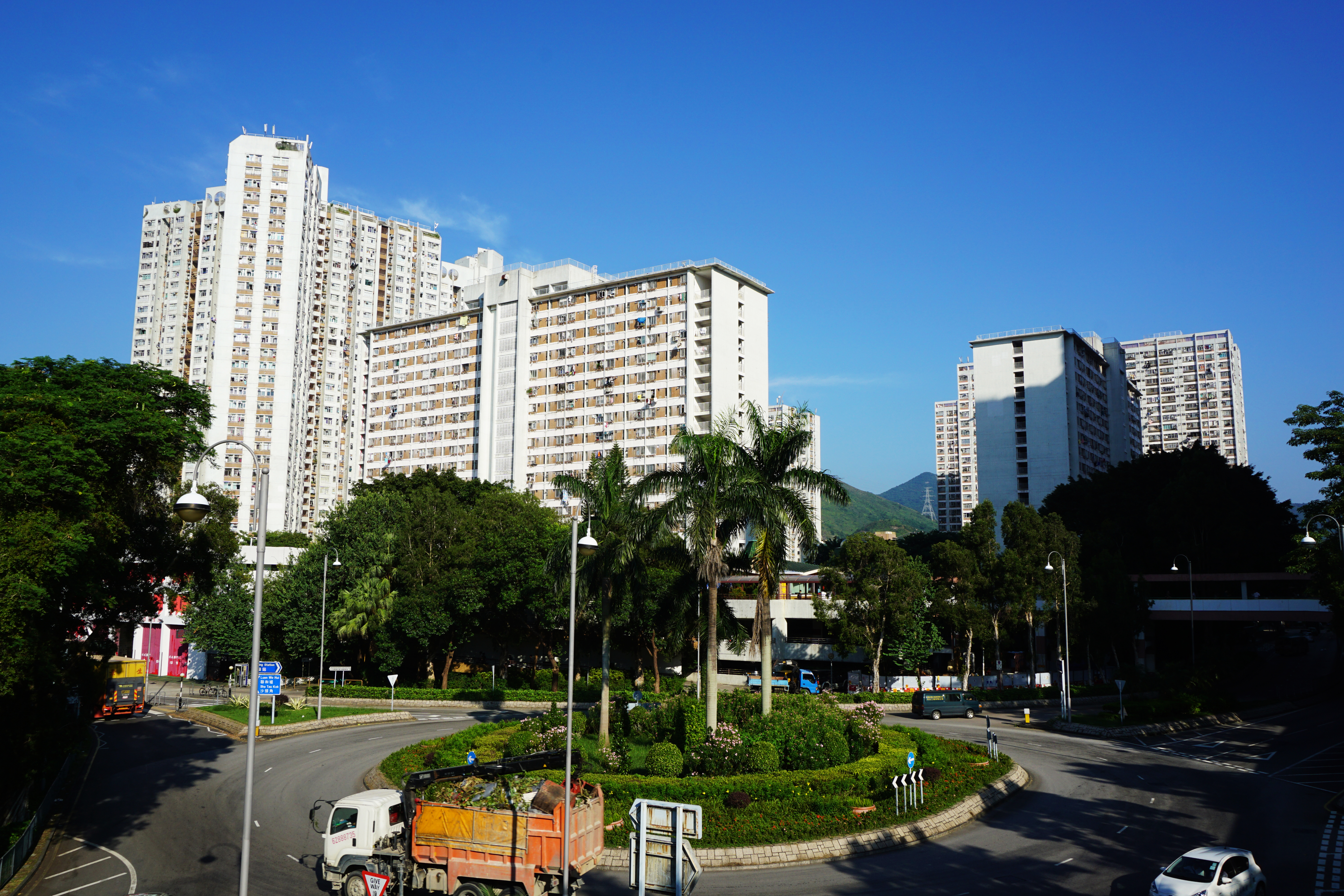
Cheung Wah Estate

Cheung Wah Estate (Chinese: 祥華邨) is a TPS estate, and the first public estate in Fanling Town. It has 10 residential blocks completed from 1984 to 1986. Some of the flats were sold to tenants through Tenants Purchase Scheme Phase 6A in 2004. A secondary school, Tung Wah Group of Hospitals Li Ka Shing College, is located in the estate.

| Name | Type | Completion |
|---|---|---|
| Cheung Lai House | Old Slab | 1984 |
| Cheung Chung House | Old Slab | 1984 |
| Cheung Shun House | Double H | 1984 |
| Cheung King House | Double H | 1984 |
| Cheung Fung House | Double H | 1984 |
| Cheung Yue House | Double H | 1984 |
| Cheung Wo House | Double H | 1984 |
| Cheung Lok House | Double H | 1984 |
| Cheung Tak House | Trident 2 | 1985 |
| Cheung Chi House | Trident 2 | 1986 |

=== Fai Ming Estate ===
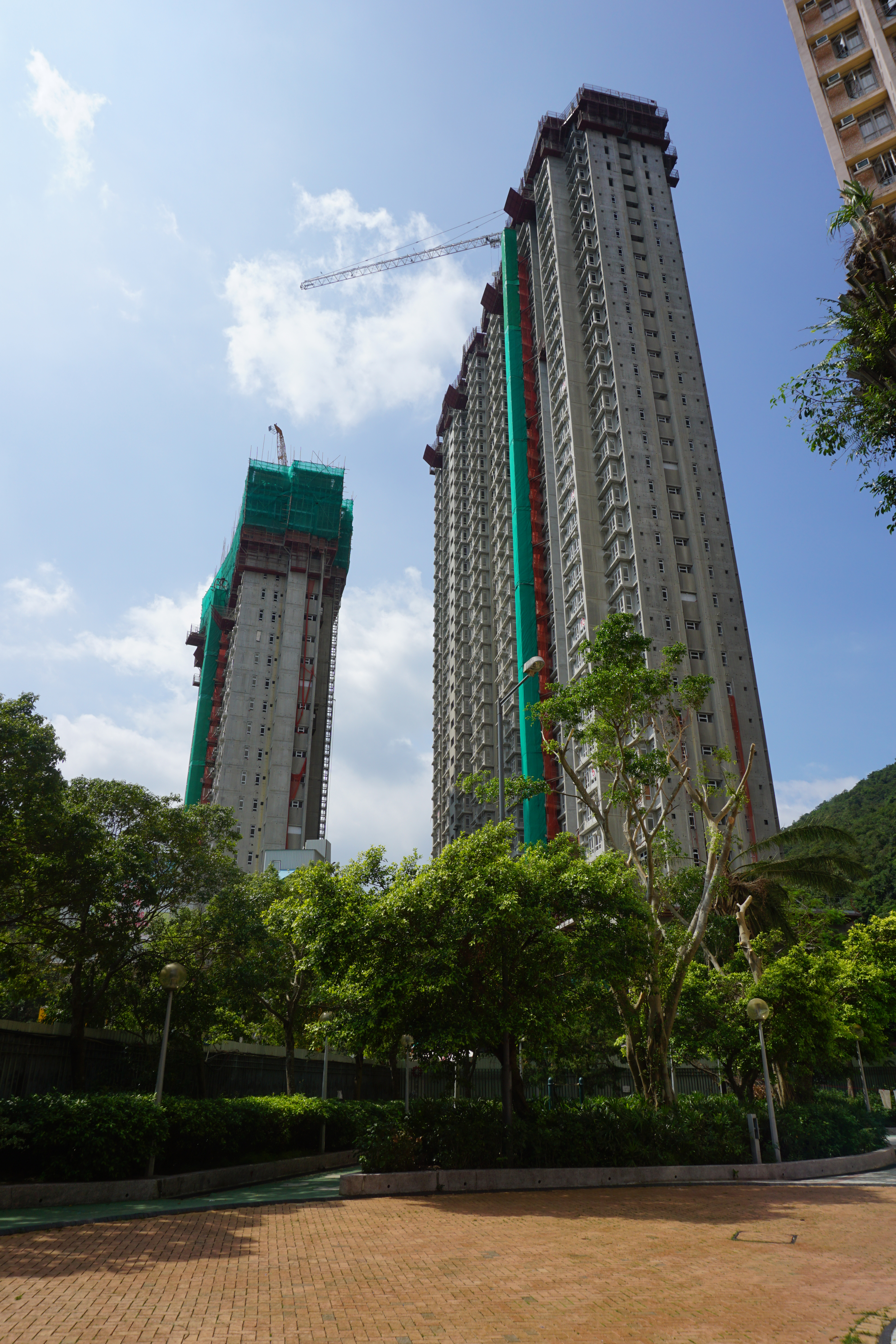
Fai Ming Estate

Fai Ming Estate (Chinese: 暉明邨), former name "Fanling Area 49", is a public housing estate in Fai Ming Road, Fanling, next to Yung Shing Court. It comprises two blocks with totally 952 flats which completed in 2019.

During COVID-19 pandemic, the Hong Kong Government planned to turn Fai Ming Estate into a place to quarantine and observe people who have been in close contact with confirmed cases. This caused protests by residents of neighbour estates.

| Name | Type | Completion |
|---|---|---|
| Sing Fai House | Non-standard | 2019 |
| Tai Fai House | Non-standard | 2019 |

=== Ka Fuk Estate ===
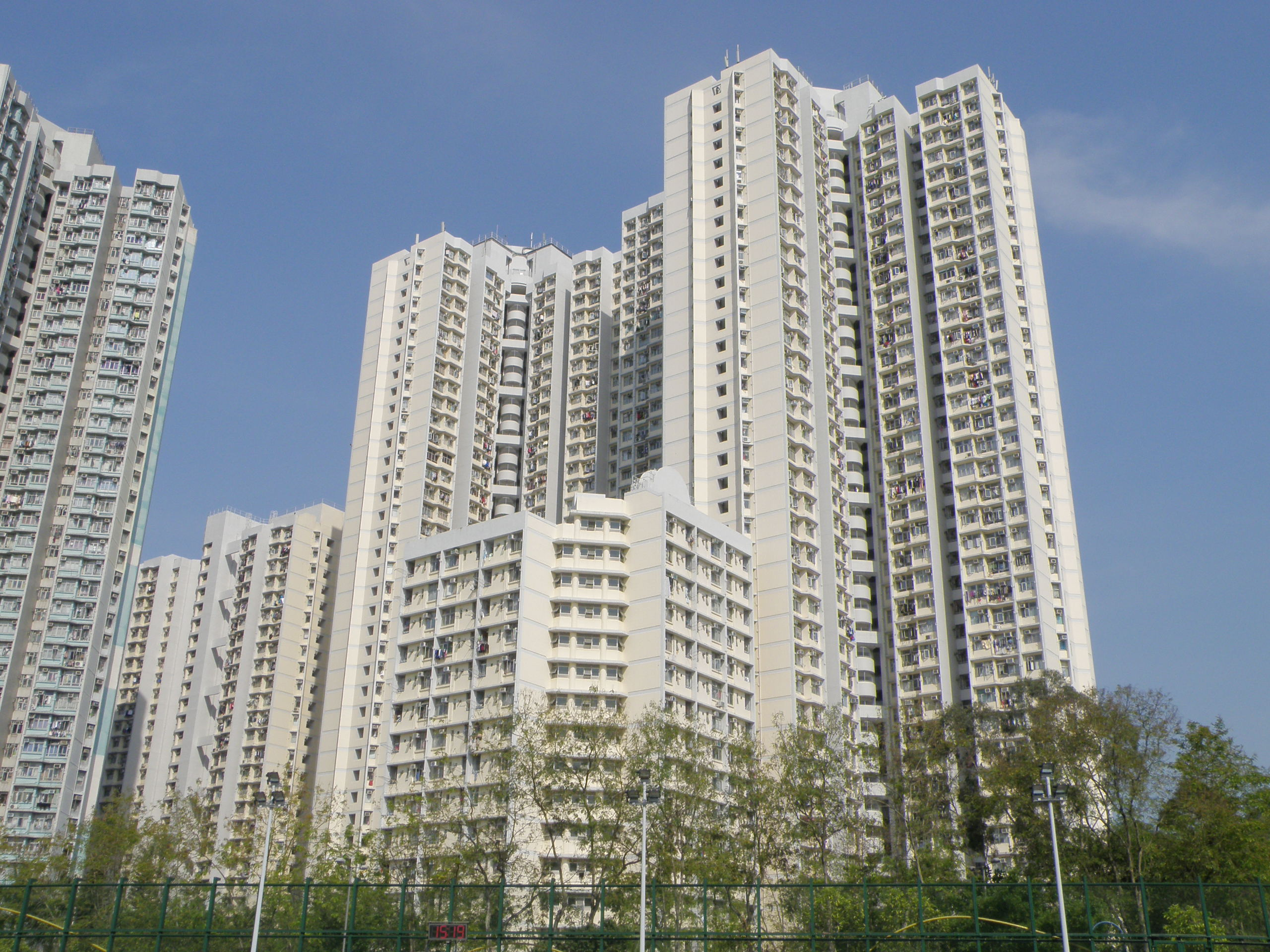
Ka Fuk Estate

Ka Fuk Estate (Chinese: 嘉福邨) is located near Fanling Highway. It consists of 3 residential buildings built in 1994.

| Name | Type | Completion |
|---|---|---|
| Fuk Lok House | Harmony 1 | 1994 |
| Fuk On House | Harmony 1 with Harmony Annex 1 | 1994 |
| Fuk Tai House | Harmony 3 | 1994 |

=== Ka Shing Court ===
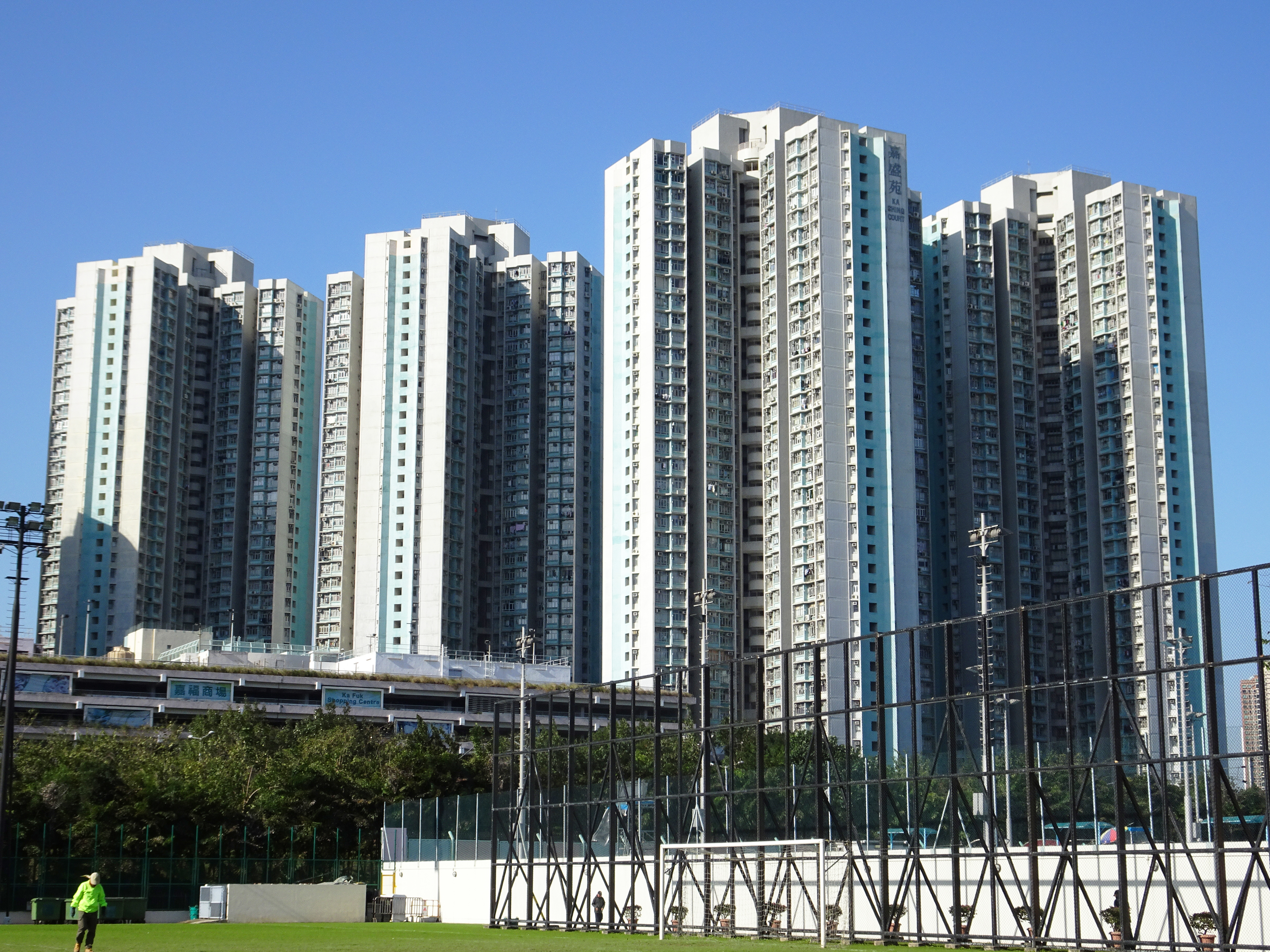
Ka Shing Court

Ka Shing Court (Chinese: 嘉盛苑) is an HOS housing estate in Fanling Town, near Ka Fuk Estate. It has 4 blocks built in 1995.

| Name | Type | Completion |
|---|---|---|
| Ka Ming House | Harmony 1 | 1995 |
| Ka Fai House | Harmony 1 | 1995 |
| Ka Yiu House | Harmony 1 | 1995 |
| Ka Yeung House | Harmony 1 | 1995 |

=== King Shing Court ===
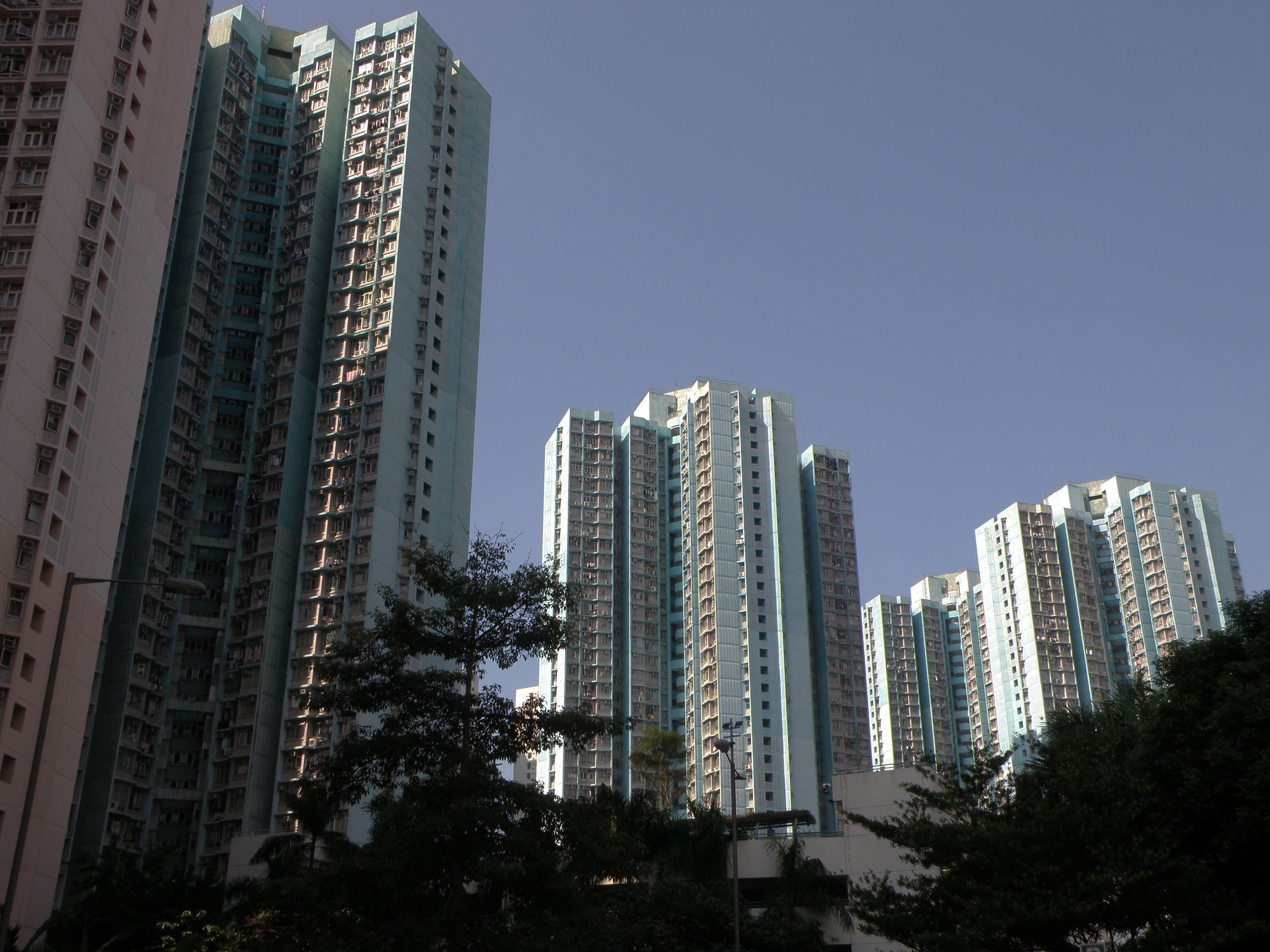
King Shing Court

King Shing Court (Chinese: 景盛苑) is an HOS housing estate in Fanling Town, near Wah Sum Estate. It has totally 4 blocks built in 1995.

| Name | Type | Completion |
|---|---|---|
| Foon King House | Harmony 1 | 1995 |
| Chun King House | Harmony 1 | 1995 |
| Yan King House | Harmony 1 | 1995 |
| Yin King House | Harmony 1 | 1995 |

=== Queen's Hill Estate and Shan Lai Court ===
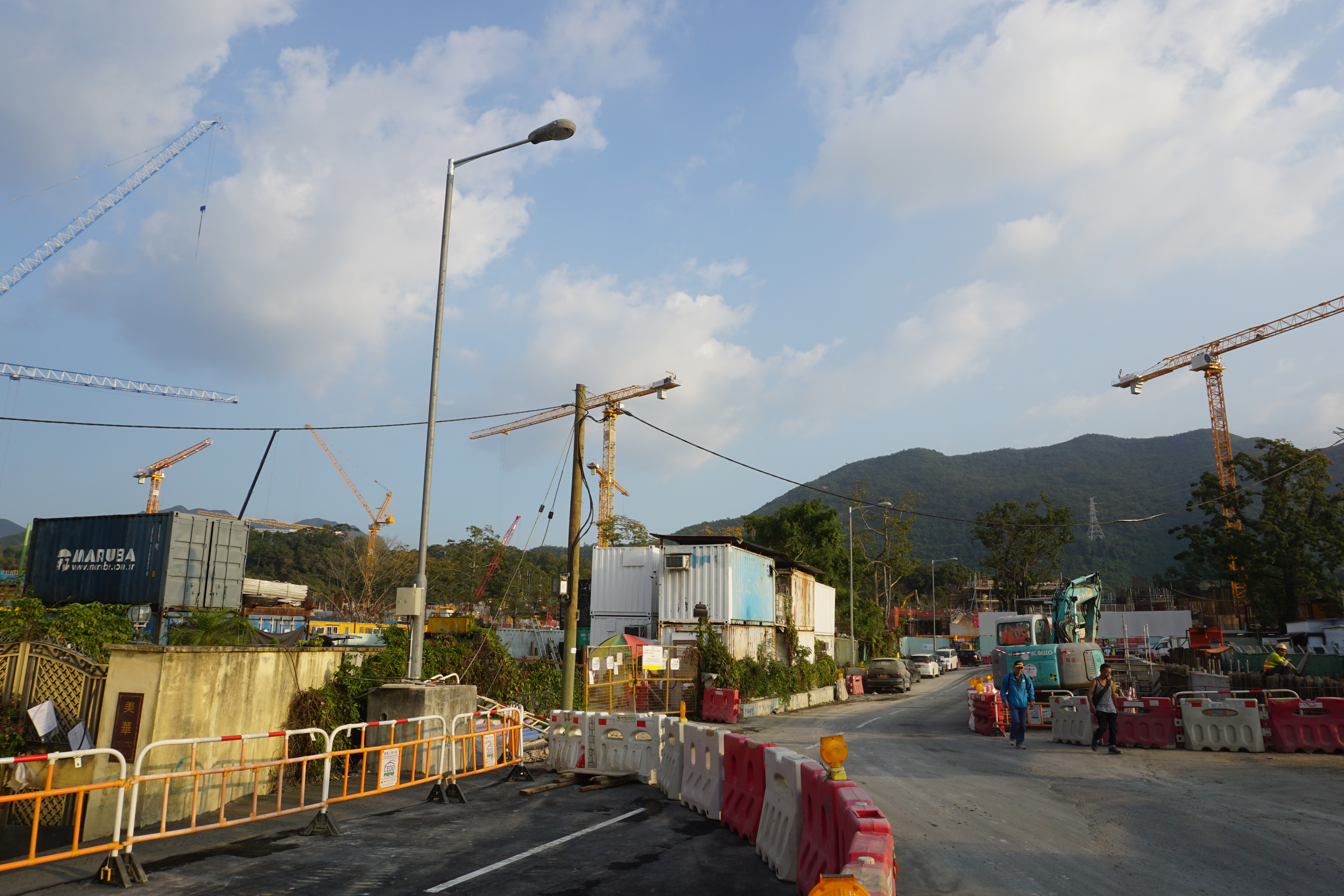
Construction site of Queen's Hill Estate

Queen's Hill Estate (Chinese: 皇后山邨) and Shan Lai Court (Chinese: 山麗苑) are a public housing estate and a Home Ownership Scheme court respectively in Kwan Tei, Fanling, North District. Formerly Queen's Hill Camp for British Forces Overseas Hong Kong, the site was originally planned for a private university, but later declined by secondary school graduates.

The site occupies about 13.65 hectares and comprises seven Public Rental Housing (PRH) blocks (i.e. Queen's Hill Estate) and six Subsidised Sale Flats (SSF) blocks (i.e. Shan Lai Court), with the provision of retail facilities, car parks, community and social welfare facilities, educational facilities, bus terminus and ancillary transport facilities. It will provide in stages a total of 8 865 PRH flats and 3 222 SSF flats for a population of 34,500 people. All construction works are expected to complete in 2021.

Queen's Hill Estate
| Name | Type | Completion |
|---|---|---|
| Wong Wui House | Non-standard | 2021 |
| Wong Yat House | Non-standard | 2021 |
| Wong Yee House | Non-standard | 2021 |
| Wong Shun House | Non-standard | 2021 |
| Wong Shing House | Non-standard | 2021 |
| Wong Lok House | Non-standard | 2021 |
| Wong Ching House | Non-standard | 2021 |

Shan Lai Court
| Name | Type | Completion |
|---|---|---|
| Chung Shan House (Block A) | Non-standard | 2021 |
| Yung Shan House (Block B) | Non-standard | 2021 |
| Hang Shan House (Block C) | Non-standard | 2021 |
| Lei Shan House (Block D) | Non-standard | 2021 |
| Ying Shan House (Block E) | Non-standard | 2021 |
| Kiu Shan House (Block F) | Non-standard | 2021 |

=== Wah Ming Estate ===
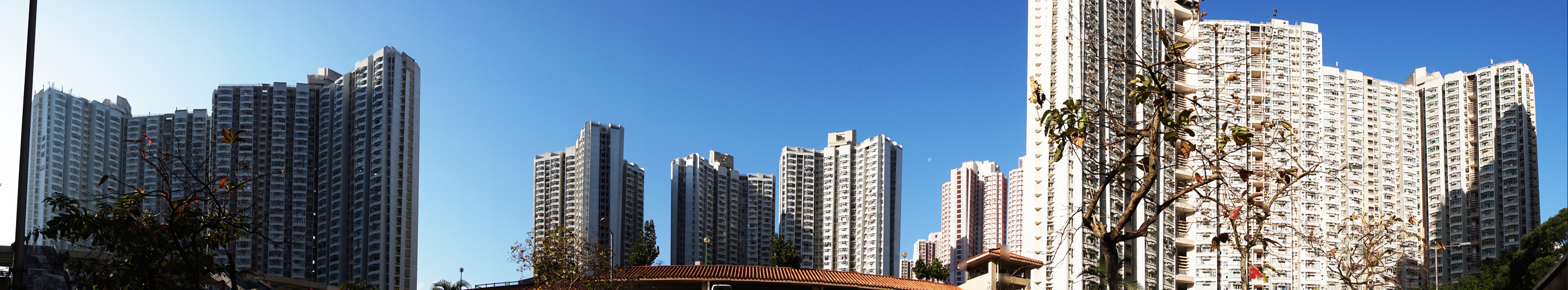
Wah Ming Estate

Wah Ming Estate (華明邨) is located in Wo Hop Shek. They were sold in the TPS of Hong Kong Housing Authority in March 1993.

| Name | Type | Completion |
|---|---|---|
| Lai Ming House | Trident 3 | 1990 |
| Shun Ming House | Trident 3 | 1990 |
| Tim Ming House | Trident 3 | 1990 |
| Yiu Ming House | Trident 3 | 1990 |
| Chung Ming House | Trident 4 | 1990 |
| Fu Ming House | Trident 4 | 1990 |
| Hong Ming House | Trident 4 | 1990 |

=== Wah Sum Estate ===
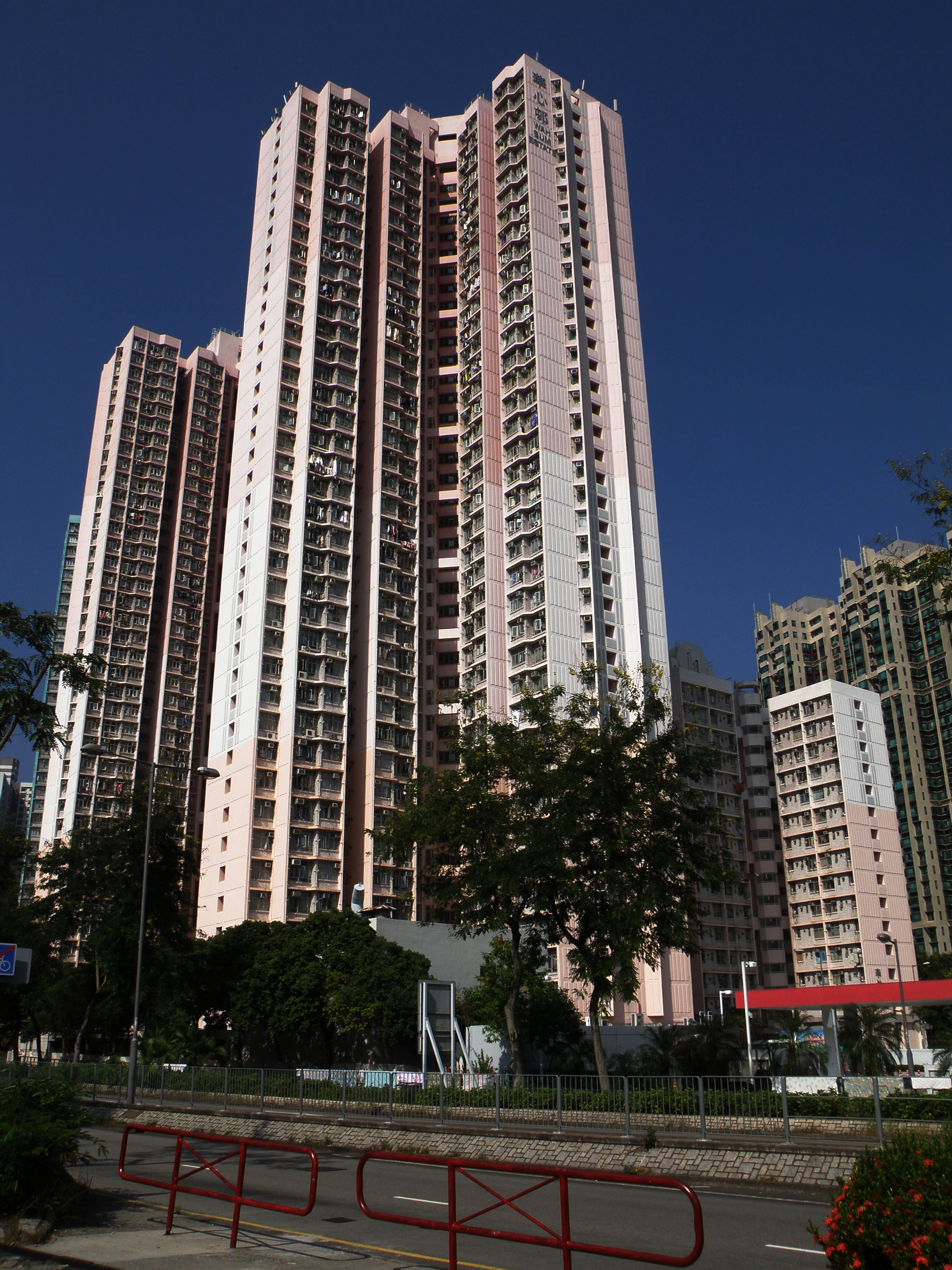
Wah Sum Estate

Wah Sum Estate (Chinese: 華心邨) is situated in Wo Hop Shek consisting of 2 residential buildings built in 1995.

| Name | Type | Completion |
|---|---|---|
| Wah Koon House | Harmony 1 | 1995 |
| Wah Min House | Harmony 1 with Harmony Annex 1 | 1995 |

=== Wing Fai Centre ===
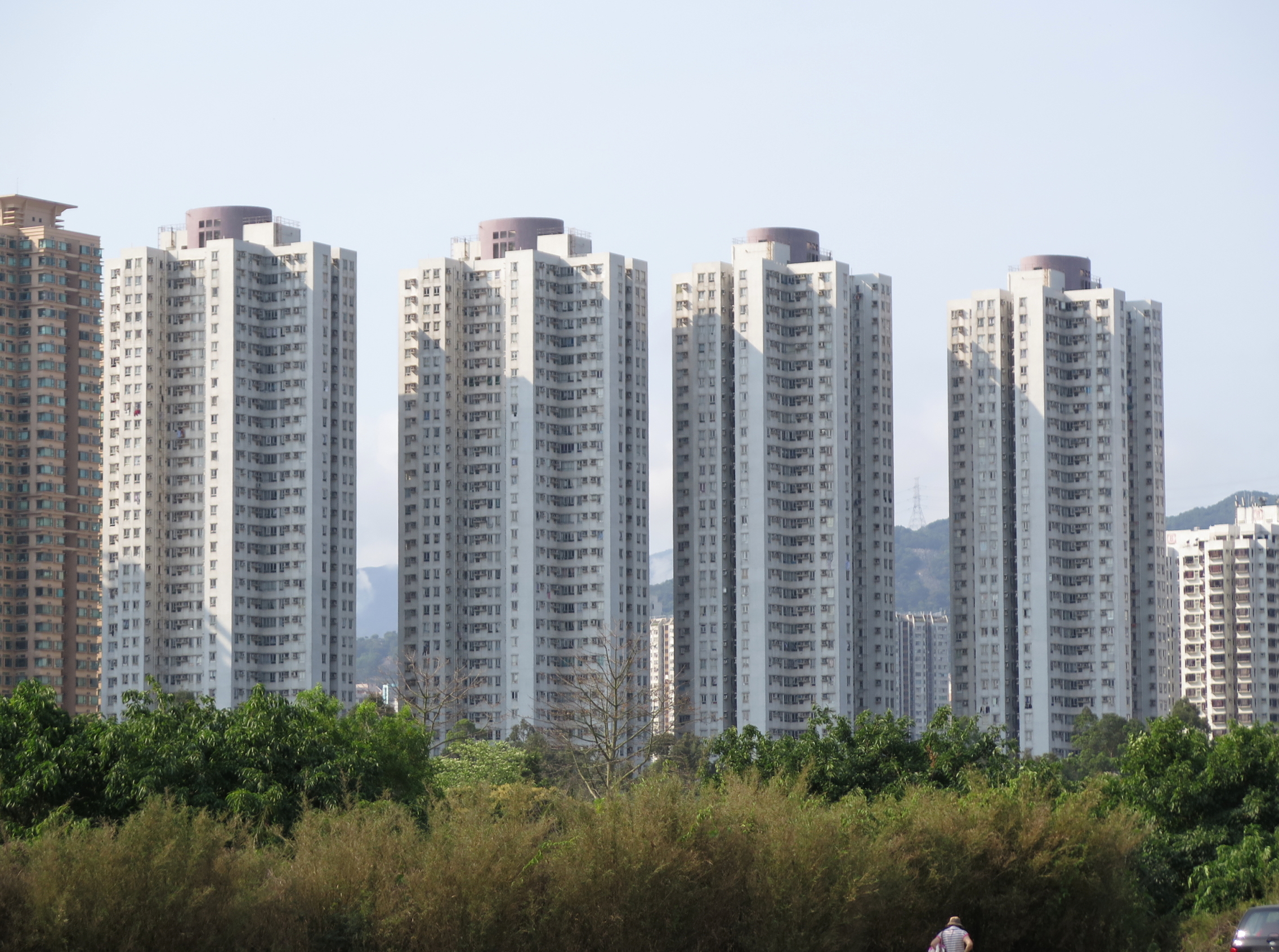
Wing Fai Centre

Wing Fai Centre (Chinese: 榮輝中心) is a PSPS housing estate in Luen Wo Hui, Fanling Town, next to Wing Fok Centre. It has totally 4 blocks built in 1996.

| Name | Type | Completion |
|---|---|---|
| Block 1 | Private Sector Participation Scheme | 1996 |
| Block 2 | Private Sector Participation Scheme | 1996 |
| Block 3 | Private Sector Participation Scheme | 1996 |
| Block 4 | Private Sector Participation Scheme | 1996 |

=== Wing Fok Centre ===
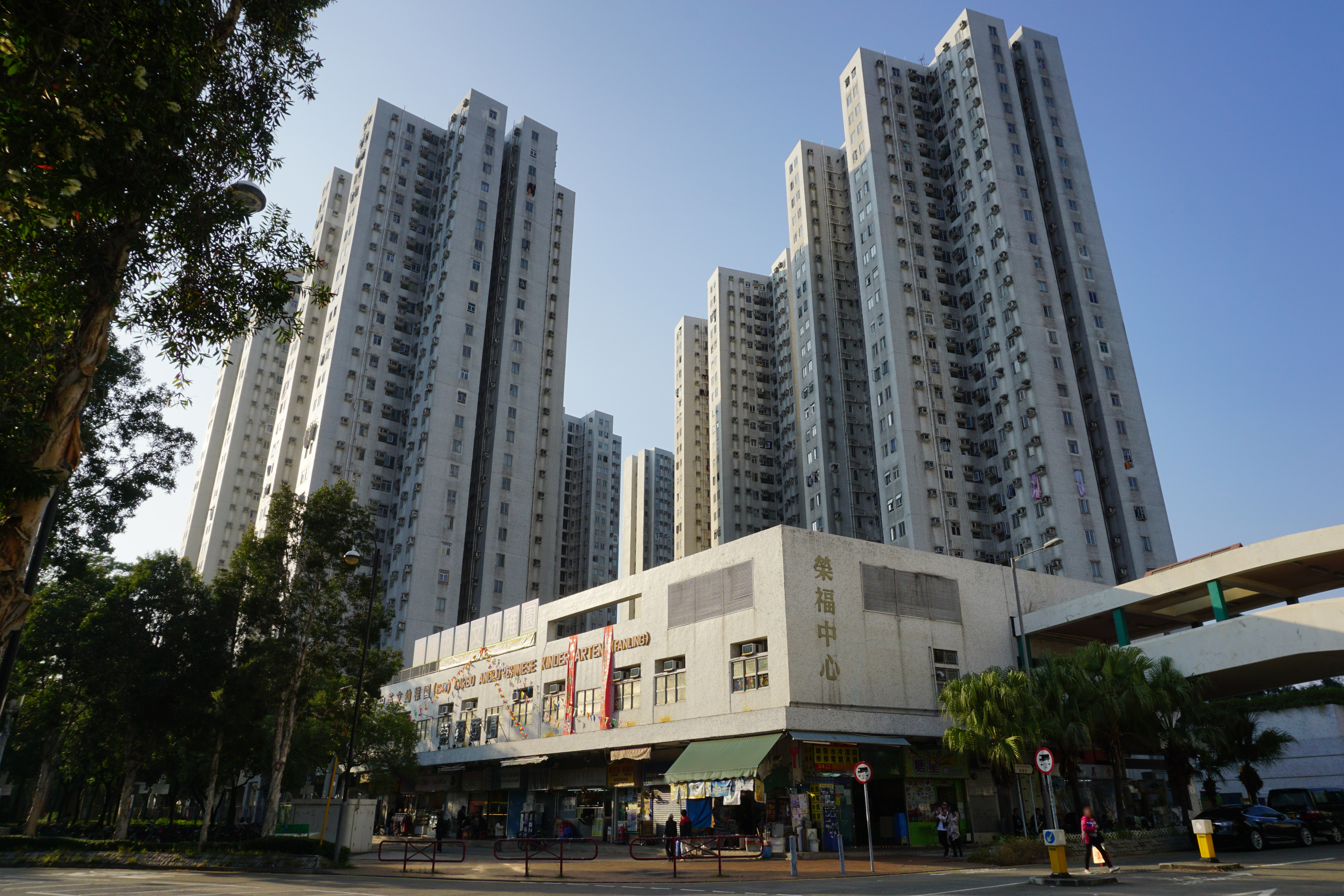
Wing Fok Centre

Wing Fok Centre (Chinese: 榮福中心) is a PSPS housing estate in Luen Wo Hui, Fanling Town. It has totally 6 blocks built in 1994.

| Name | Type | Completion |
|---|---|---|
| Block 1 | Private Sector Participation Scheme | 1994 |
| Block 2 | Private Sector Participation Scheme | 1994 |
| Block 3 | Private Sector Participation Scheme | 1994 |
| Block 4 | Private Sector Participation Scheme | 1994 |
| Block 5 | Private Sector Participation Scheme | 1994 |
| Block 6 | Private Sector Participation Scheme | 1994 |

=== Yan Shing Court ===
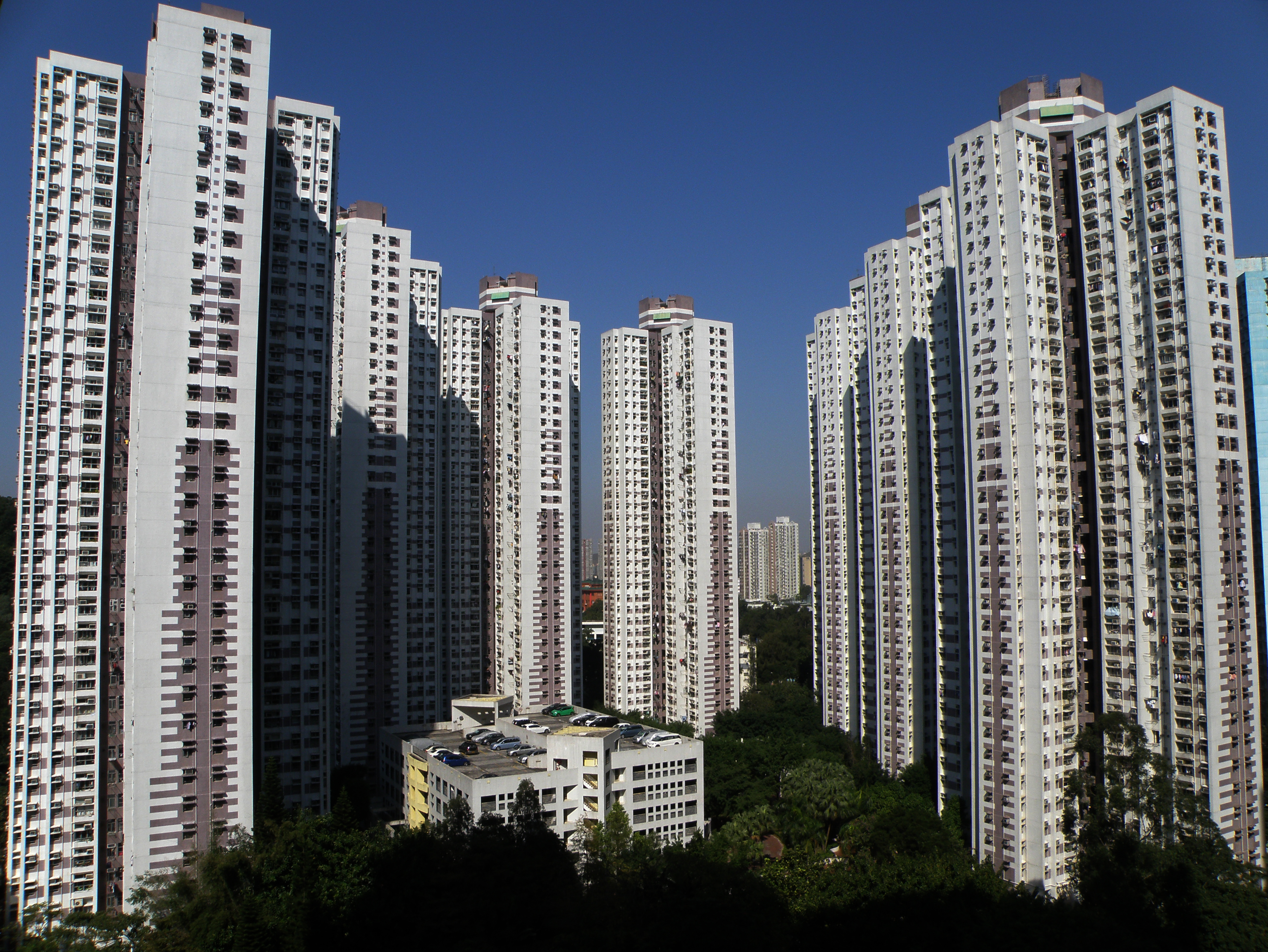
Yan Shing Court

Yan Shing Court (Chinese: 欣盛苑) is an HOS housing estate in Fanling Town, near Flora Plaza, King Shing Court. It has totally 7 blocks built in 1993.

| Name | Type | Completion |
|---|---|---|
| Yan Sau House | NCB (Ver.1984) | 1993 |
| Yan Lai House | NCB (Ver.1984) | 1993 |
| Yan Hei House | NCB (Ver.1984) | 1993 |
| Yan Yuet House | NCB (Ver.1984) | 1993 |
| Yan Yiu House | NCB (Ver.1984) | 1993 |
| Yan Choi House | NCB (Ver.1984) | 1993 |
| Yan Fai House | NCB (Ver.1984) | 1993 |

=== Yung Shing Court ===
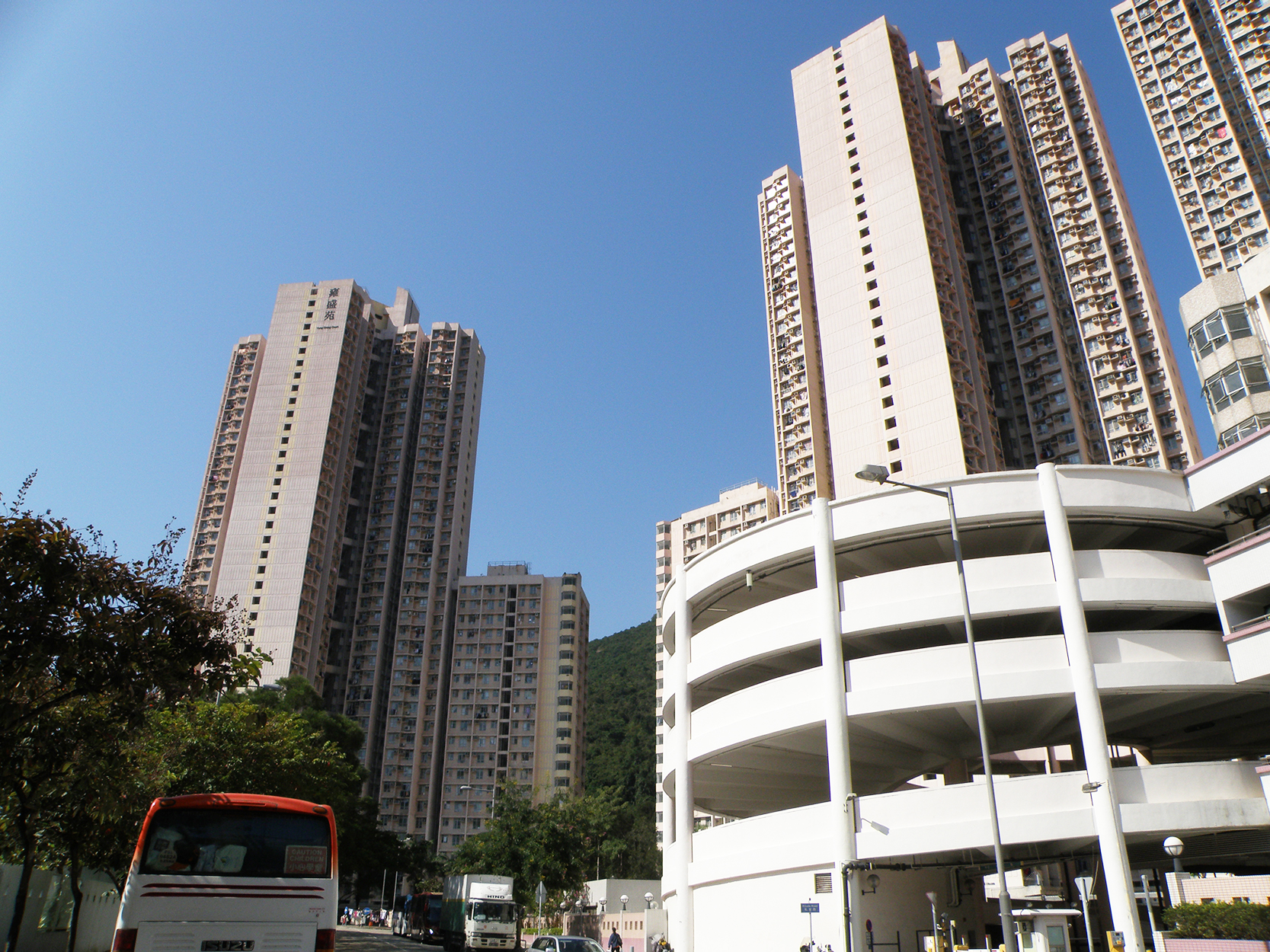
Rental section

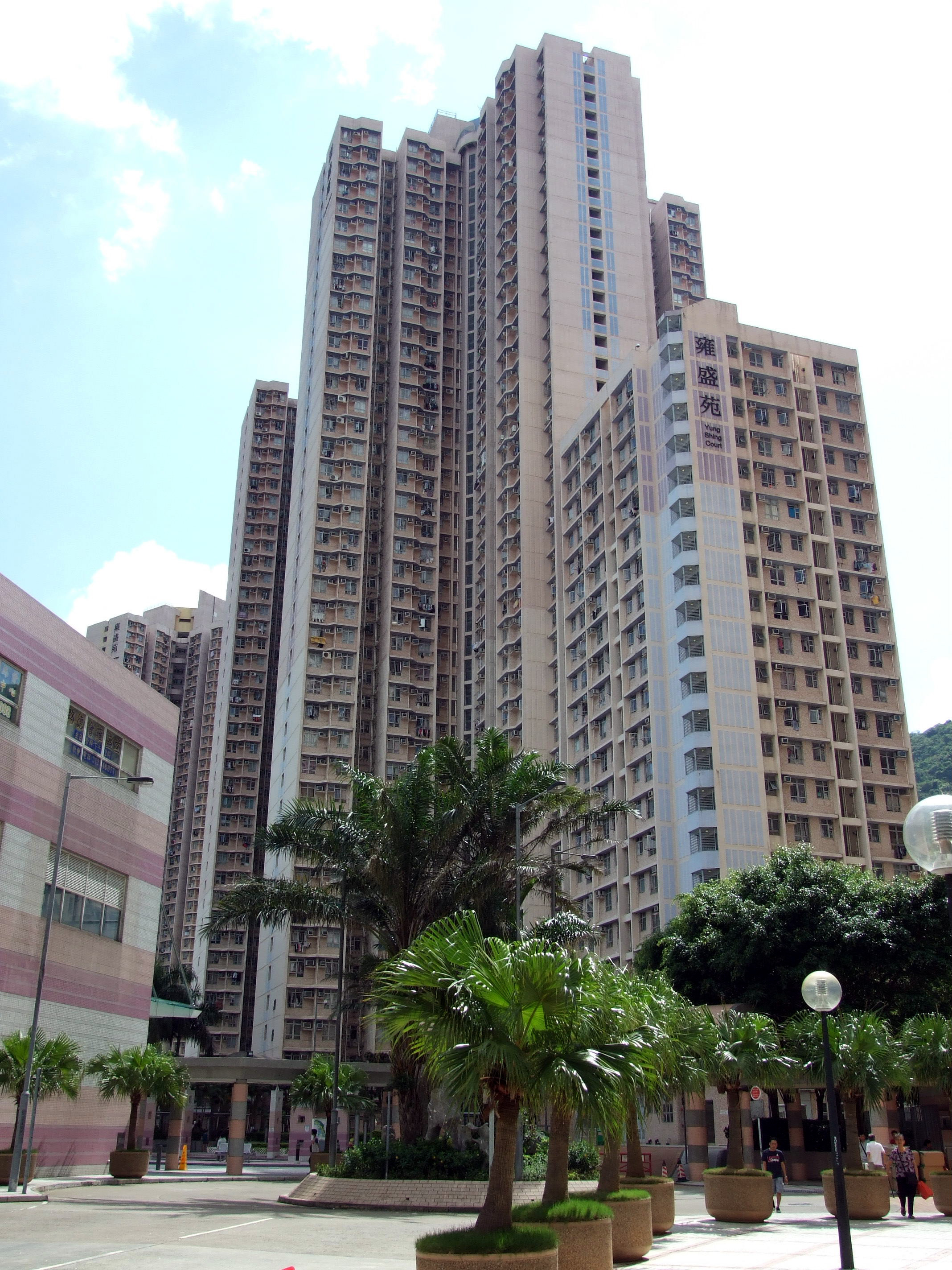
Rental or buy section

Yung Shing Court (Chinese: 雍盛苑) is an HOS housing estate consisting of three residential buildings completed in 2000. Yung Sui House and Yung Wui House are for rental while Yung Wa House is for Buy or Rent Option.

| Name | Type | Usage | Completion |
|---|---|---|---|
| Yung Sui House | Harmony 1 | Rental | 2000 |
| Yung Wa House | Harmony 1 | Rental | 2000 |
| Yung Wui House | Harmony 1 | HOS | 2000 |

== See also ==
- Public housing in Hong Kong
- List of public housing estates in Hong Kong
