= Wing Fok Centre =

Public housing estate in Fanling, Hong Kong

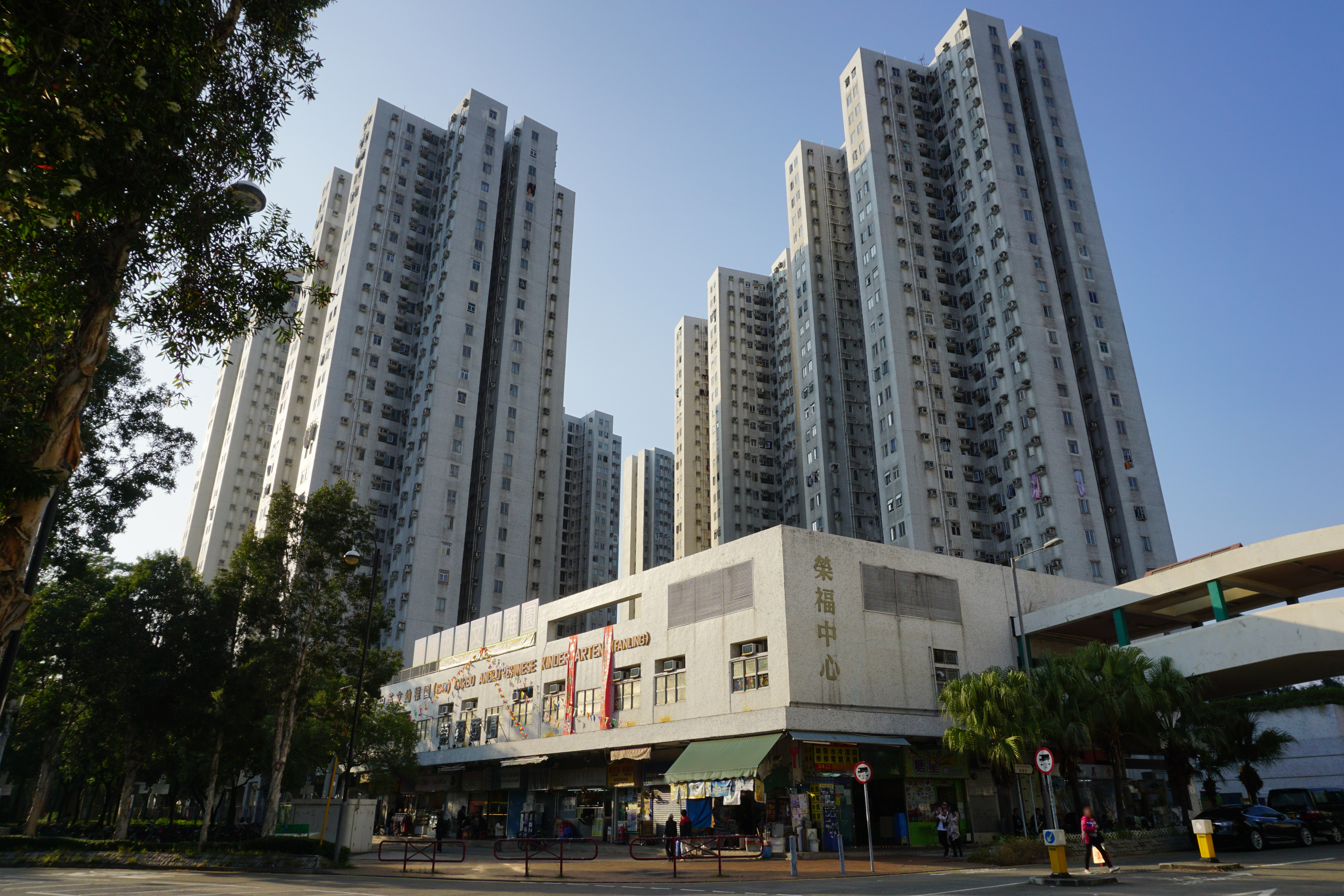
- Wing Fok Centre
- Interactive map of Wing Fok Centre

General information
- Location: 1 Luen Chit Street, Luen Wo Hui; Fanling; New Territories, Hong Kong
- Coordinates: 22.50138°N 114.14084°E
- Status: Completed
- Category: Home Ownership Scheme
- Population: 4,734 (2016)
- No. of blocks: 6
- No. of units: 1,680

Construction
- Constructed: 1994; 32 years ago
- Authority: Hong Kong Housing Authority

Wing Fok Centre (Chinese: 榮福中心) is a Home Ownership Scheme and Private Sector Participation Scheme court in Luen Wo Hui, Fanling, New Territories, Hong Kong next to Wing Fai Centre. It has a total of six residential blocks built in 1994.

== Houses ==
Name	Chinese name	Building type	Completed
Block 1	第1座	Private Sector Participation Scheme	1994
Block 2	第2座	Private Sector Participation Scheme	1994
Block 3	第3座	Private Sector Participation Scheme	1994
Block 4	第4座	Private Sector Participation Scheme	1994
Block 5	第5座	Private Sector Participation Scheme	1994
Block 6	第6座	Private Sector Participation Scheme	1994

== Demographics ==
According to the 2016 by-census, Wing Fok Centre had a population of 4,734. The median age was 48 and the majority of residents (97.2%) were of Chinese ethnicity. The average household size was 3 people. The median monthly household income of all households (i.e. including both economically active and inactive households) was HK$29,000.

== Politics ==
Wing Fok Centre is located in Luen Wo Hui constituency of the North District Council. It is currently represented by Chow Kam-ho, who was elected in the 2019 elections.

== See also ==
- Public housing estates in Fanling
