= Wing Fai Centre =

Public housing estate in Fanling, Hong Kong

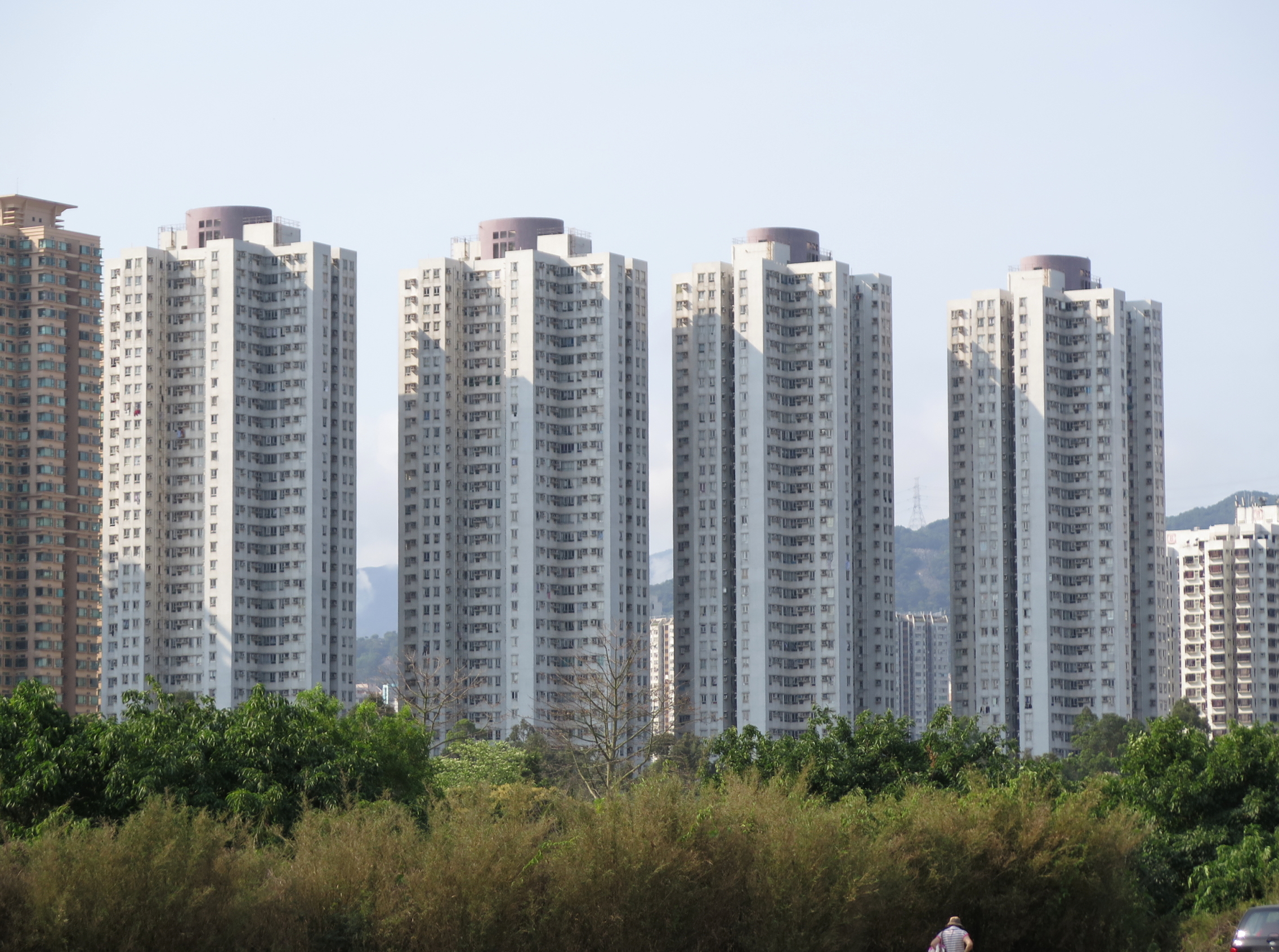
- Wing Fai Centre
- Interactive map of Wing Fai Centre

General information
- Location: 2-10 Luen Chit Street, Luen Wo Hui; Fanling; New Territories, Hong Kong
- Coordinates: 22.5015°N 114.14298°E
- Status: Completed
- Category: Home Ownership Scheme
- Population: 4,061 (2016)
- No. of blocks: 4
- No. of units: 1,350

Construction
- Constructed: 1996; 30 years ago
- Authority: Hong Kong Housing Authority

Wing Fai Centre (Chinese: 榮輝中心) is a Home Ownership Scheme and Private Sector Participation Scheme court in Luen Wo Hui, Fanling, New Territories, Hong Kong next to Wing Fok Centre. It has a total of four residential blocks built in 1996.

== Houses ==
Name	Chinese name	Building type	Completed
Tower 1	第1座	Private Sector Participation Scheme	1996
Tower 2	第2座	Private Sector Participation Scheme	1996
Tower 3	第3座	Private Sector Participation Scheme	1996
Tower 4	第4座	Private Sector Participation Scheme	1996

== Demographics ==
According to the 2016 by-census, Wing Fai Centre had a population of 4,061. The median age was 45.9 and the majority of residents (95.7%) were of Chinese ethnicity. The average household size was 3.1 people. The median monthly household income of all households (i.e. including both economically active and inactive households) was HK$34,210.

== Politics ==
Wing Fai Centre is located in Luen Wo Hui constituency of the North District Council. It is currently represented by Chow Kam-ho, who was elected in the 2019 elections.

== See also ==
- Public housing estates in Fanling
