= Queen's Hill Estate =

Public housing estate in Fanling, Hong Kong

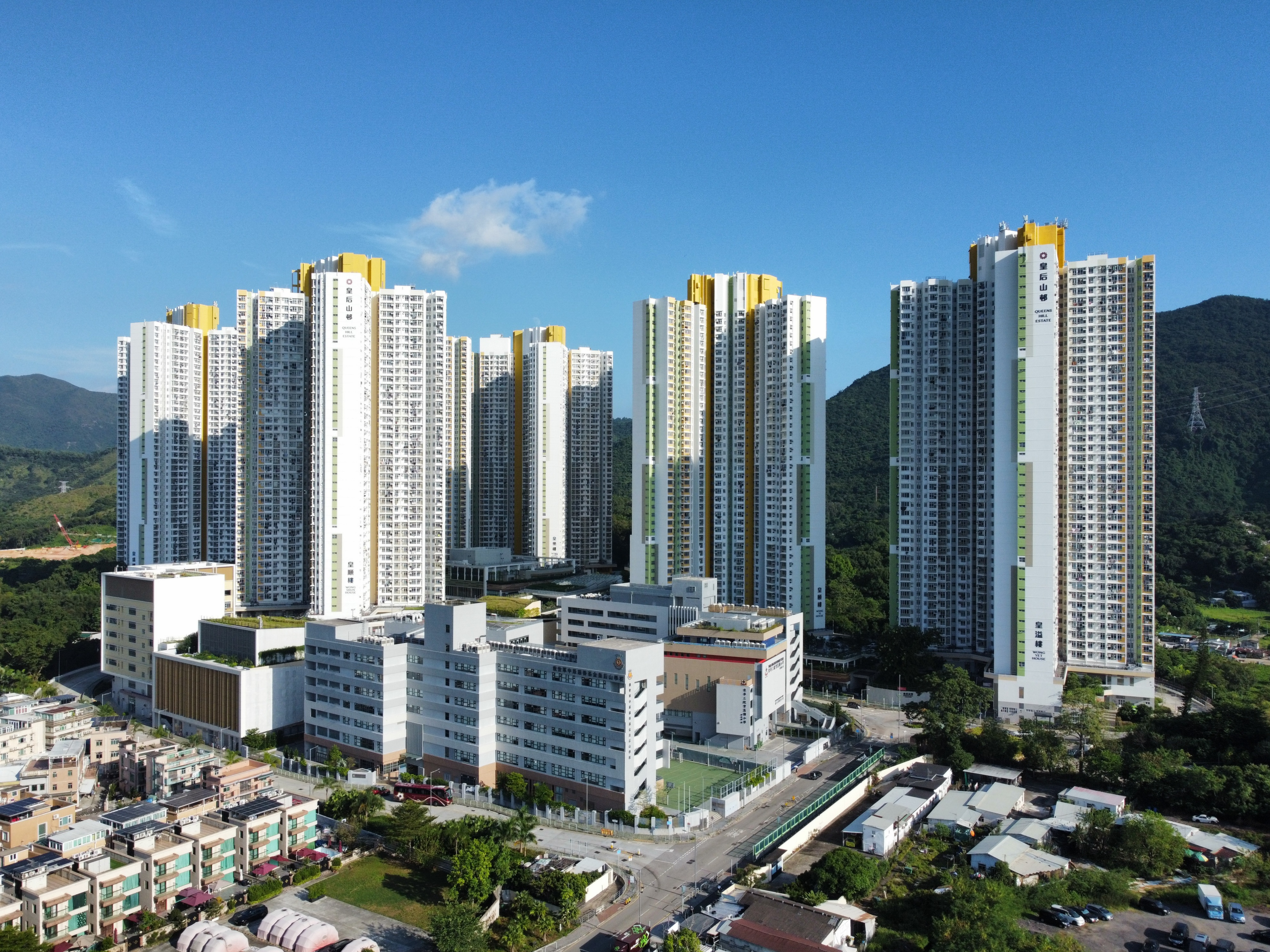
- Queen's Hill Estate
- Interactive map of Queen's Hill Estate

General information
- Location: 66 Lung Ma Road, Kwan Tei; Fanling; New Territories, Hong Kong
- Coordinates: 22.502829°N 114.1562074°E
- Status: Completed
- Category: Public rental housing
- No. of blocks: 7
- No. of units: 8,865

Construction
- Constructed: 2021; 5 years ago
- Authority: Hong Kong Housing Authority

Queen's Hill Estate (Chinese: 皇后山邨) is a public housing estate in Kwan Tei, Fanling, New Territories, Hong Kong. Formerly Queen's Hill Camp for British Forces Overseas Hong Kong, the site was originally planned for a private university, but later used for public housing due to declining numbers of secondary school graduates. It consists of seven residential blocks completed in 2021.

Shan Lai Court (山麗苑) is a Home Ownership Scheme court in Kwan Tei, near Queen's Hill Estate. It consists of six residential blocks completed in 2021.

The site occupies about 13.65 hectares (33.7 acres) and comprises seven Public Rental Housing (PRH) blocks and six Subsidised Sale Flats (SSF) blocks, with the provision of retail facilities, car parks, community and social welfare facilities, educational facilities, bus terminus and ancillary transport facilities. It will provide in stages a total of 8,865 PRH flats and 3,222 SSF flats for a population of around 34,500 people.

== Houses ==
=== Queen's Hill Estate ===
Name	Chinese name	Building type	Completed
Wong Wui House	皇滙樓	Non-standard	2021
Wong Yi House	皇頤樓	Non-standard	2021
Wong Yet House	皇溢樓	Non-standard	2021
Wong Shun House	皇順樓	Non-standard	2021
Wong Sheng House	皇盛樓	Non-standard	2021
Wong Lok House	皇樂樓	Non-standard	2021
Wong Ching House	皇澄樓	Non-standard	2021

=== Shan Lai Court ===
Name	Chinese name	Building type	Completed
Chung Shan House	松山閣	Non-standard	2021
Yung Shan House	榕山閣	Non-standard	2021
Hang Shan House	杏山閣	Non-standard	2021
Lei Shan House	梨山閣	Non-standard	2021
Ying Shan House	楹山閣	Non-standard	2021
Kiu Shan House	橋山閣	Non-standard	2021

== Politics ==
Queen's Hill Estate and Shan Lai Court are located in Queen's Hill constituency of the North District Council. It is currently represented by Law Ting-tak, who was elected in the 2019 elections.

== See also ==
- Public housing estates in Fanling
