= Fai Ming Estate =

Housing estate in Fanling, Hong Kong

Coordinates: 22°28′52″N 114°08′10″E

- Chinese: 暉明邨
- Cantonese Yale: faī mìhng chyūn
Transcriptions
Yue: Cantonese
- Yale Romanization: faī mìhng chyūn
- Jyutping: fai1 ming4 cyun1

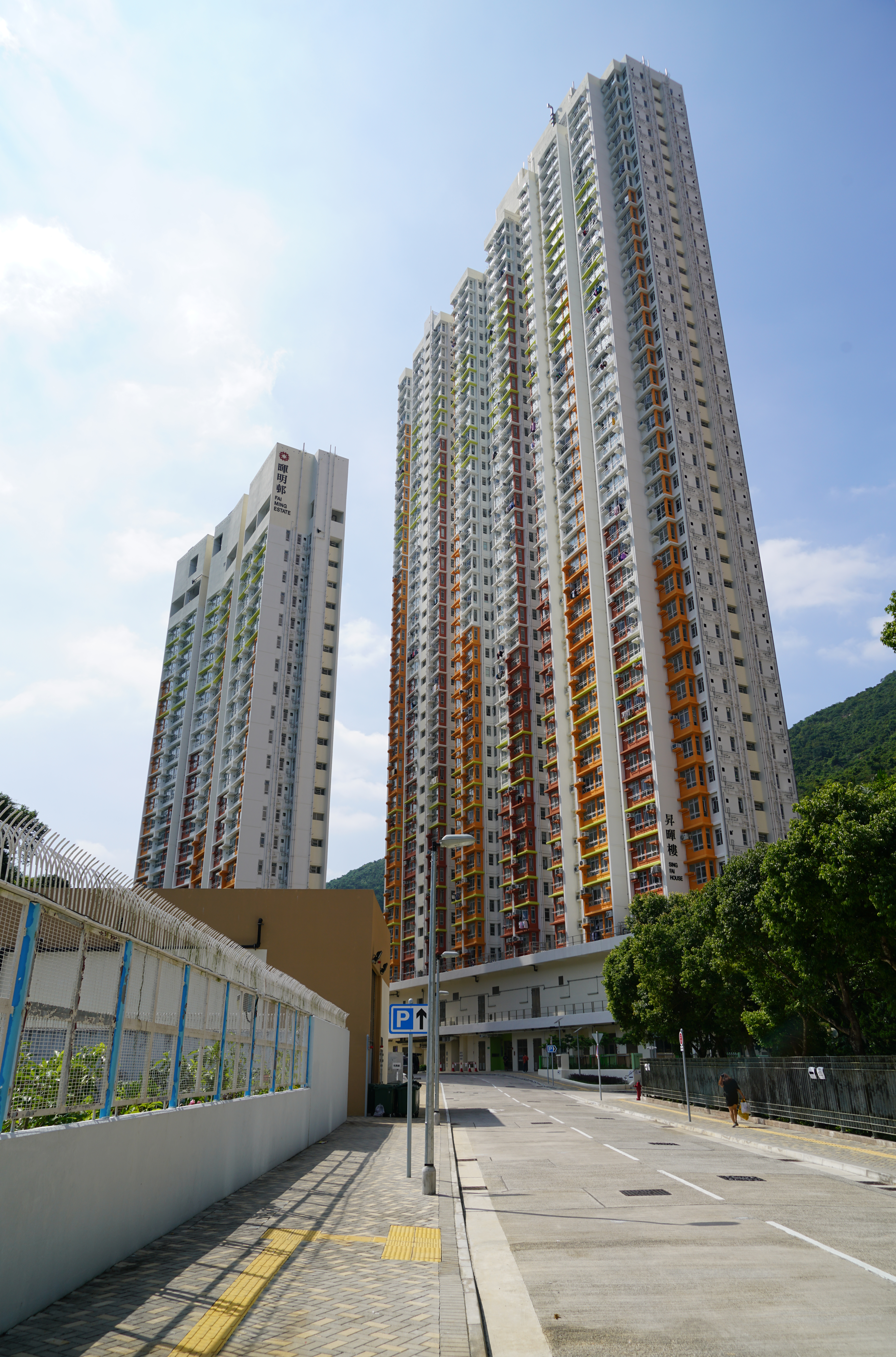
Fai Ming Estate

Fai Ming Estate (Chinese: 暉明邨), former name "Fanling Area 49 Public Housing Development", is a public housing estate on Fai Ming Road in Fanling, New Territories, Hong Kong, next to Yung Shing Court. It was completed in 2019 and comprises two blocks with a total of 952 flats.

During the COVID-19 pandemic, the Hong Kong Government planned to turn Fai Ming Estate into a place to quarantine and observe people who have been in close contact with confirmed cases. This caused the residents of neighbouring estates to protest against the decision.

== Name ==
The housing estate is named after Fai Ming Road (暉明路), where it is located.

== Development ==
Fai Ming Estate is located in a valley between Kei Lak Tsai and Pak Tai To Yan. The plot of land, with an area of 0.82 hectares, was originally zoned for government, institution or community use. It was rezoned as a residential area in response to a demand for additional public housing in the district. The original plan involved the construction of one 34-storey residential block providing around 700 flats, with construction beginning in 2013 and completing in 2017.

A 2013 environmental impact assessment concluded that the land had high environmental value, where uncommon bat species have been discovered. The assessment recommended that mitigation measures must be adopted, including that the western part of the plot can only be used for planting, and foundations cannot be constructed on existing water pathways. The Housing Authority constructed a recreational park in that area. The plan was revised in 2014 following surveying, which revealed that parts of the land plot were unsuitable for laying foundations. The new plan involved the construction of two residential blocks of 41 and 18 storeys respectively, providing around 940 flats. The increase in flats was provided by an increase in plot ratio in response to a new government policy mandating the construction of more public housing units.

Work on the foundations was delayed in 2017 because the original contractor, China State Construction Engineering, faced difficulties with the terrain and had insufficient staff to work on the project. The Housing Authority decided to restart tendering for the construction of foundations for the project. China State Construction Engineering was required to pay contractual damages and was temporarily barred from submitting tenders for construction work of public housing projects in Hong Kong.

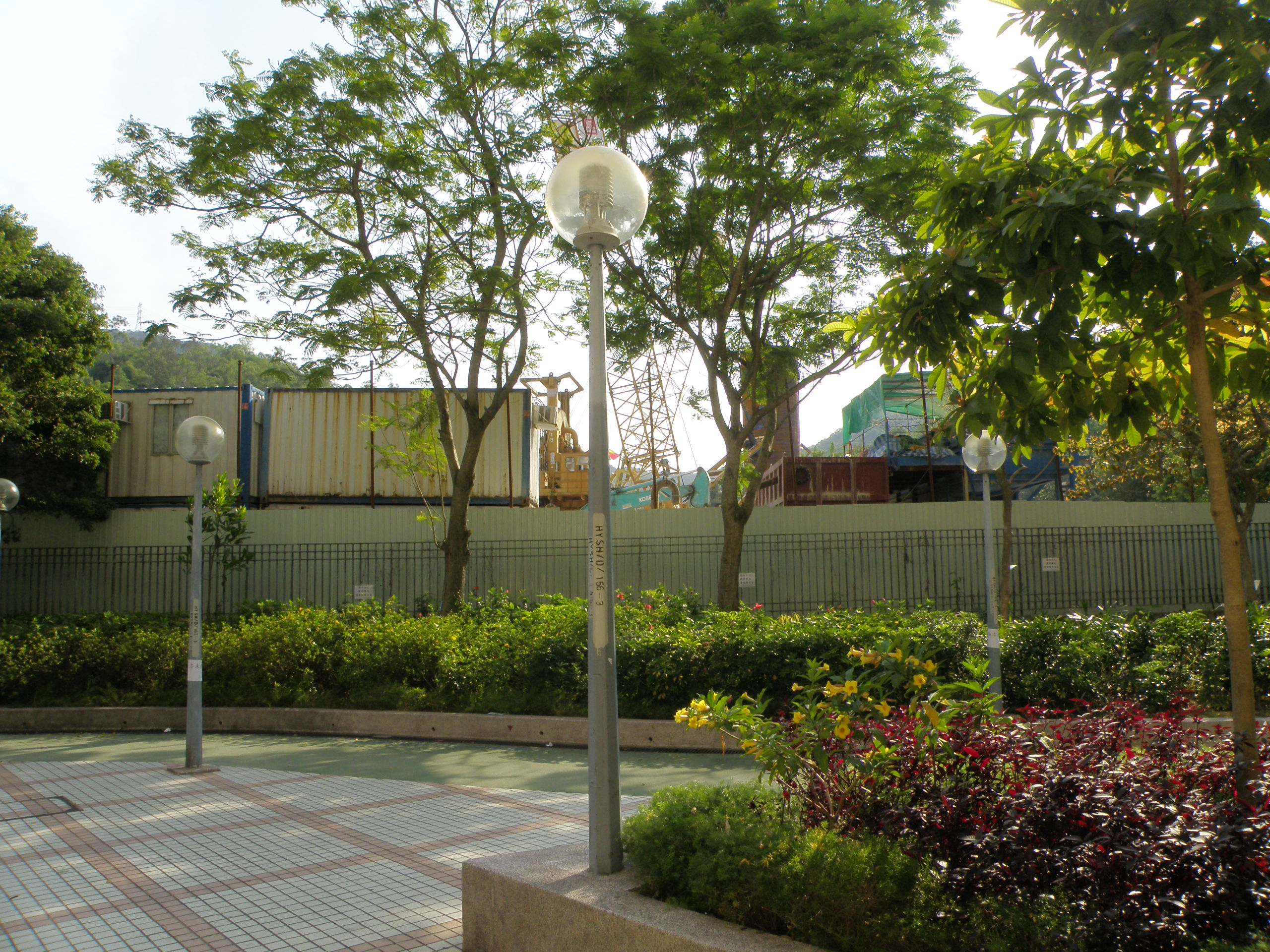
April 2015

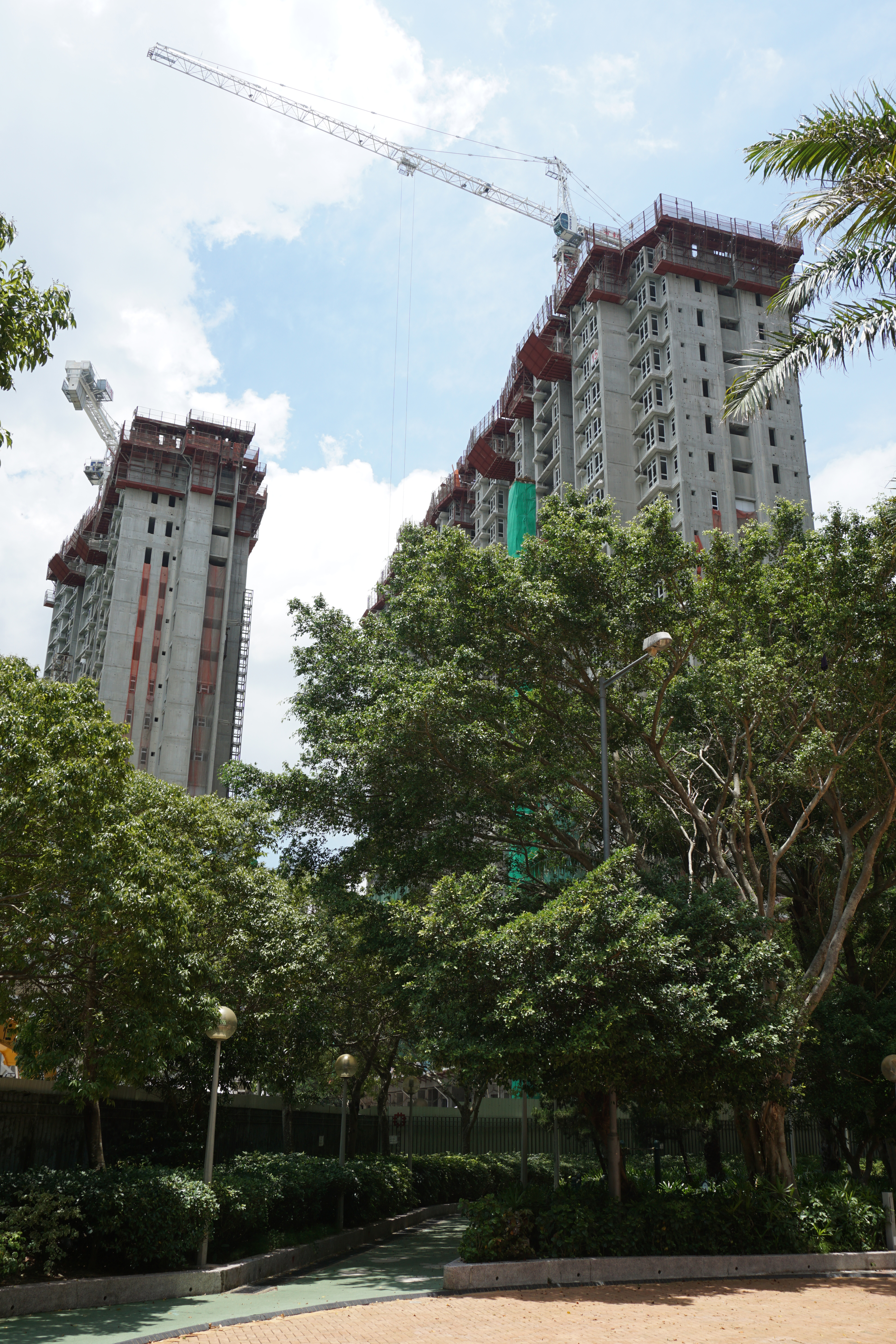
May 2018

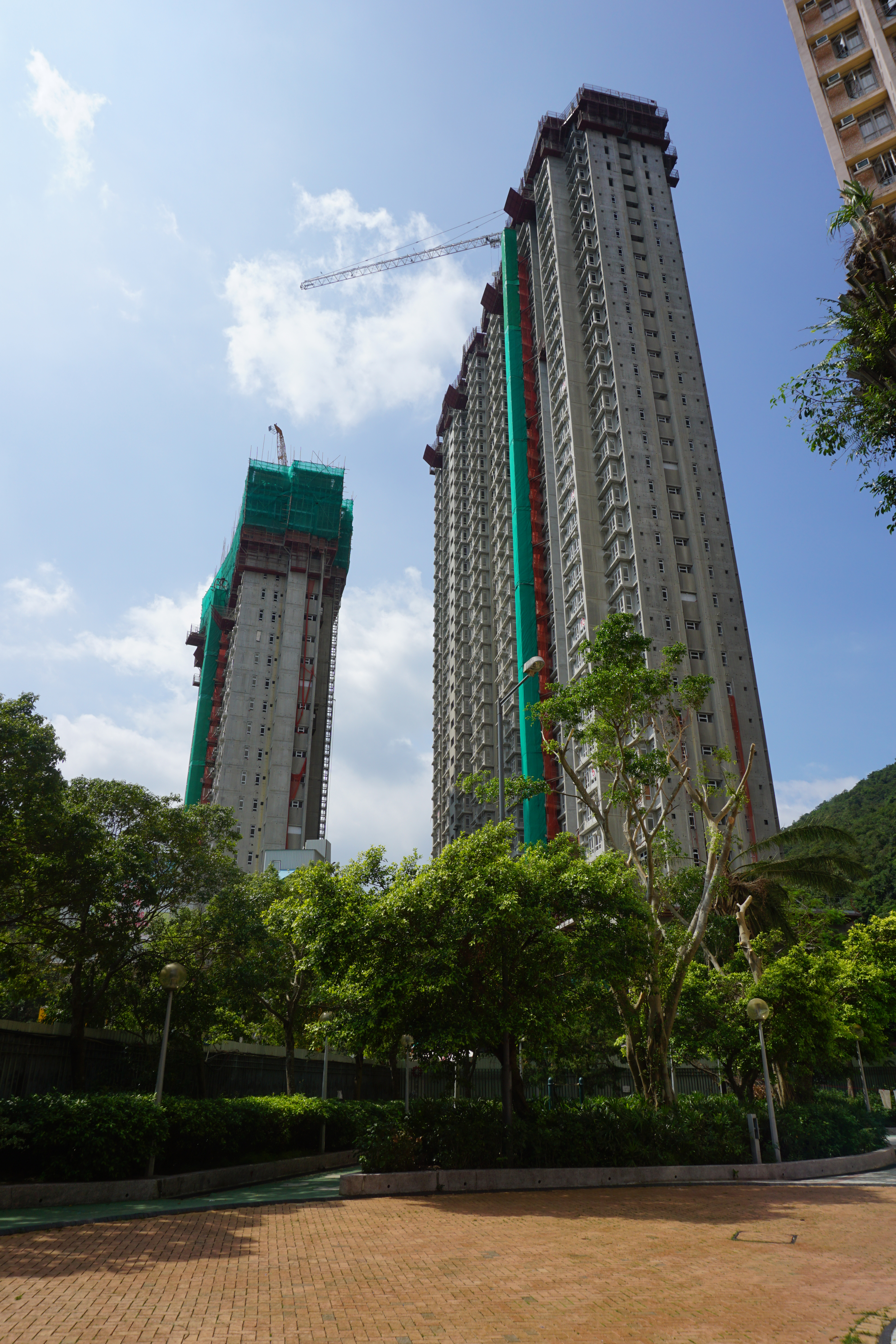
October 2018

== Blocks ==
Name	Type	Completion
Sing Fai House	Non-standard	2019
Tai Fai House	Non-standard	2019

== COVID-19 pandemic and government plan for use as quarantine facility ==
Video of the protest

On 25 January 2020, the Department of Health announced that it planned to use Fai Ming Estate as a quarantine facility to house close contacts of those infected with SARS-CoV-2 and healthcare staff who require accommodation, in response to the COVID-19 pandemic which has led to several confirmed cases in Hong Kong. The announcement was met with harsh criticism from members of the North District Council. Law Ting-tak, chairman of the North District Council, noted Fai Ming Estate's location adjacent to high-density housing estates, undercapacity at North District Hospital leading to its inability to adequately cope with an influx of patients, a lack of infrastructure in the vicinity, and the need to reaccommodate villagers in northeastern New Territories whose houses faced redevelopment. Law started a petition against the plan, which was signed by 16 members of the North District Council.

At 3:00 pm on the next day, more than 100 residents of nearby housing estates constructed makeshift road blocks with portable traffic barriers, bricks and bicycles to obstruct the entrance to Fai Ming Estate, in an attempt to prevent the government from transporting supplies into the housing estate. At 7 pm, district councillors arrived at the scene to calm tensions, but to no avail: the building lobby was set on fire with petrol bombs, the road block was extended to nearby Wah Ming Road, and several traffic lights on Wah Ming Road were damaged. Firefighters arrived at the scene and extinguished the fire an hour later. The protest crossed party lines, with participation from both supporters and opponents of the government.

Riot police searched 30 people, and arrested 11 people aged between 16 and 42 for unlawful assembly and obstruction of police duty. The government announced that it would suspend work on the housing estate until authorities meet with the North District Council on 29 January. However, journalists who entered Sing Fai House, one of the residential blocks, discovered that the flats had already been furnished with basic furniture including a bed and household items, indicating that the flats were already ready for occupation upon the government's announcement.

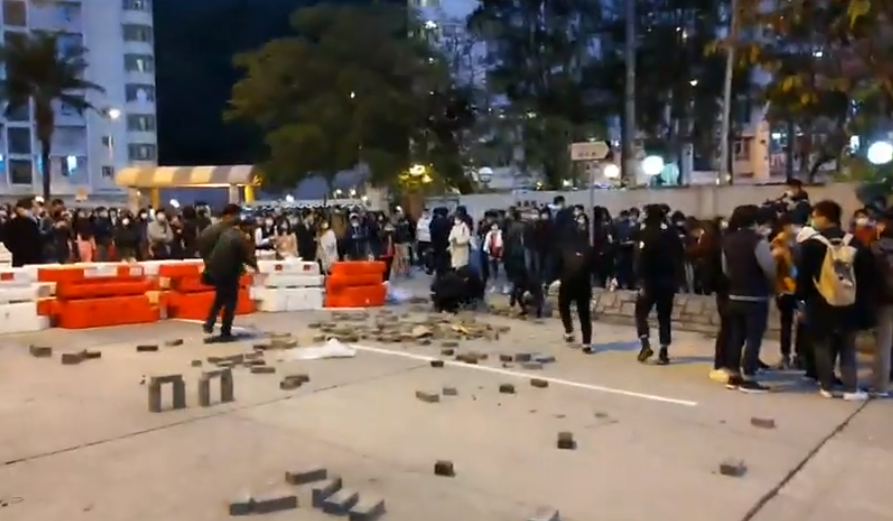
Residents blocking Fai Ming Road with traffic barriers and bricks

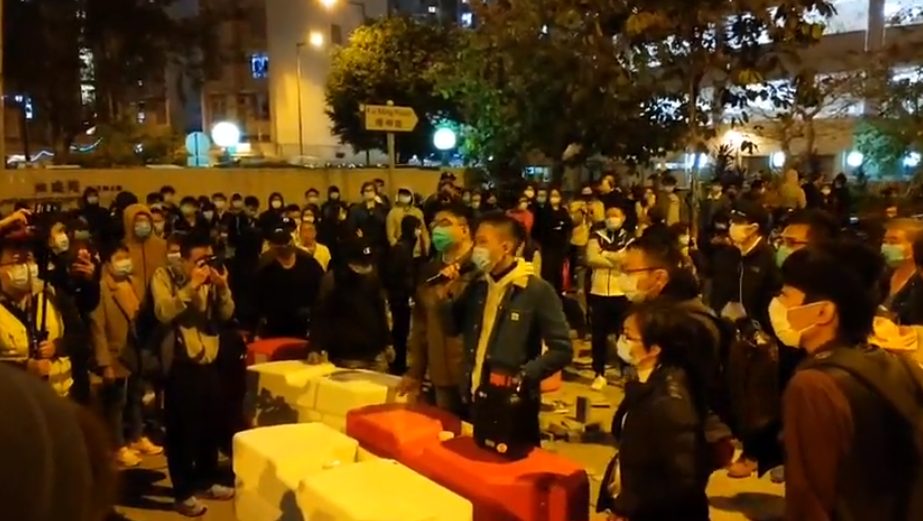
District councillors intervening

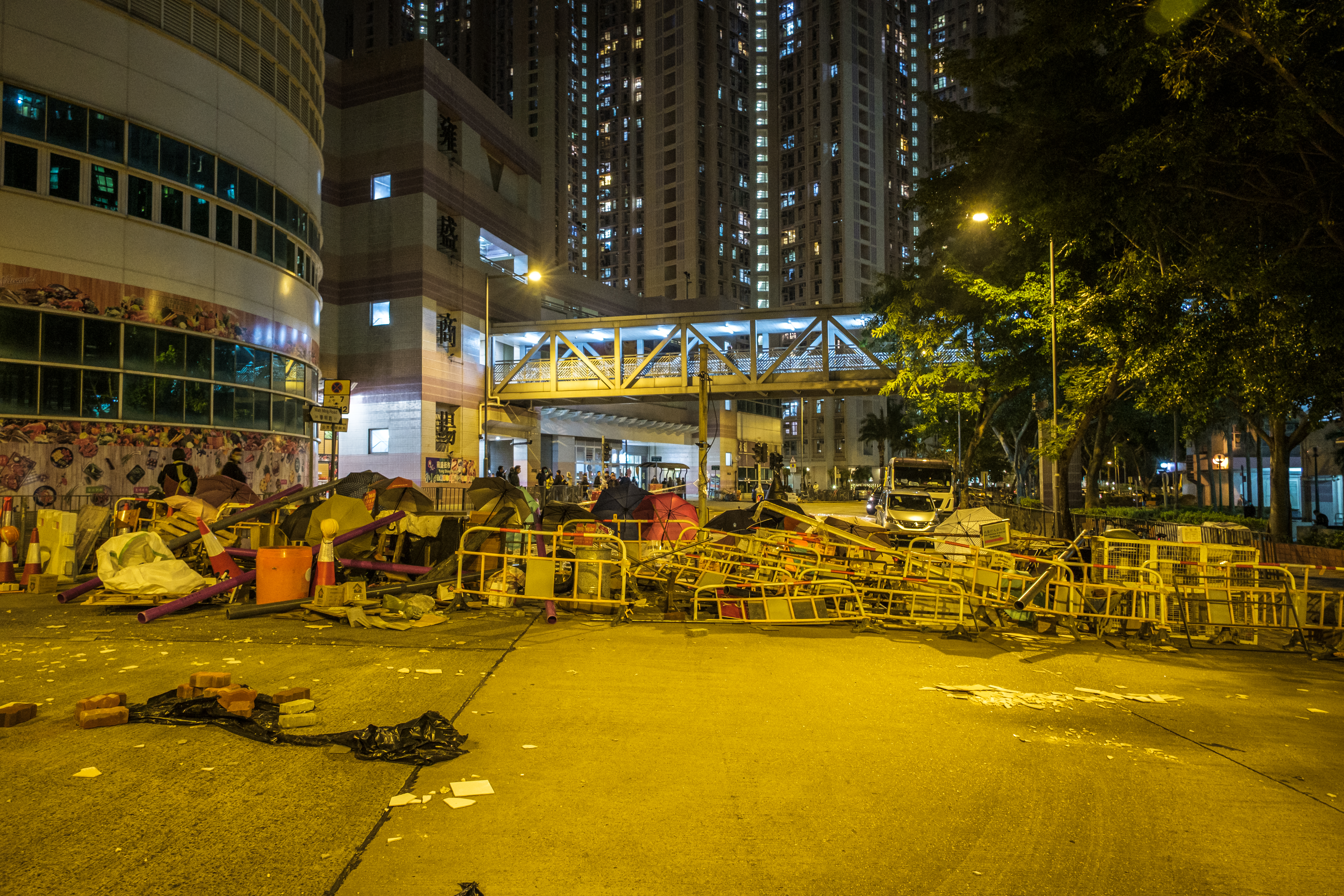
Residents extending the road block to Wah Ming Road

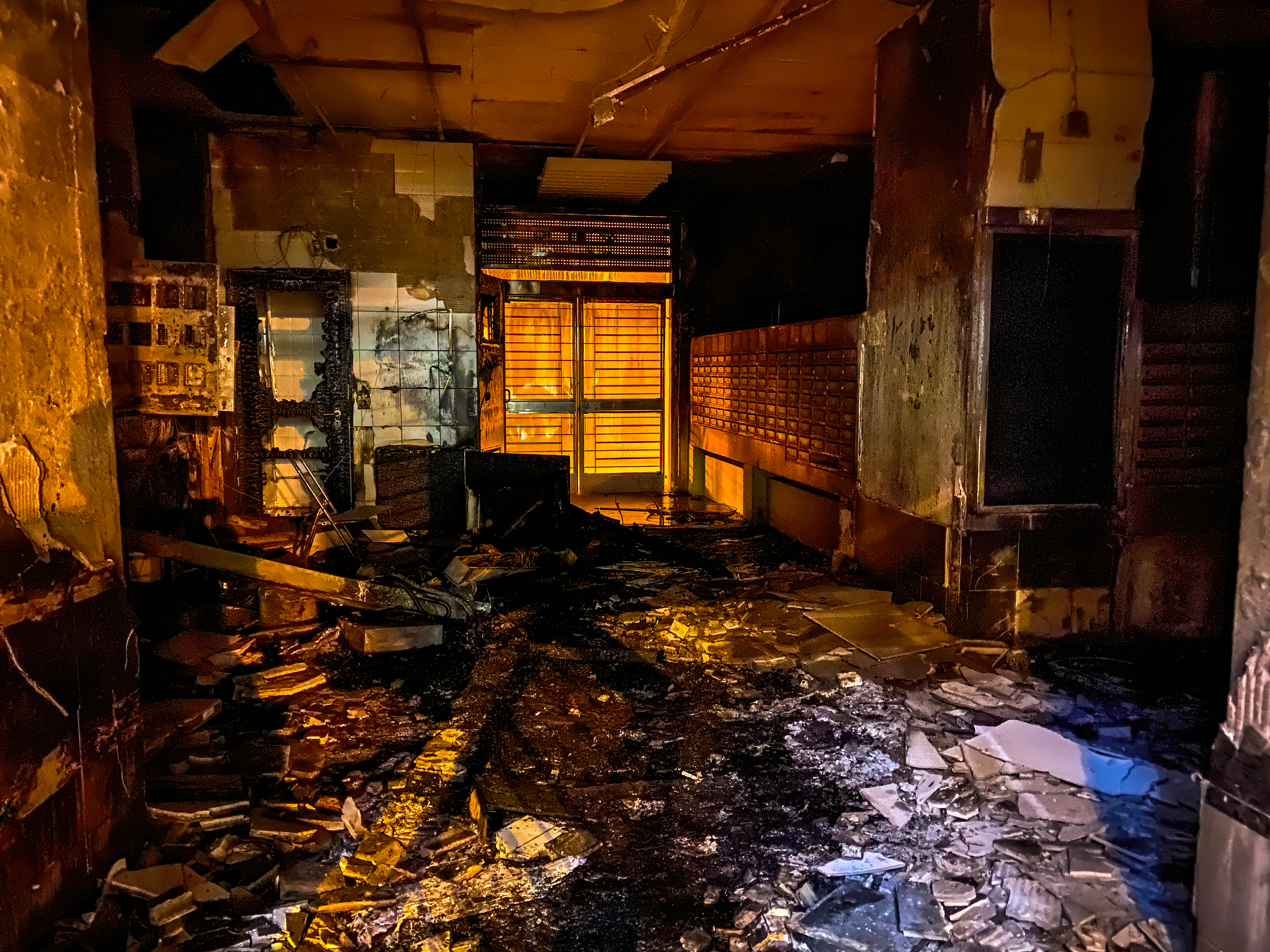
Lobby after the protest

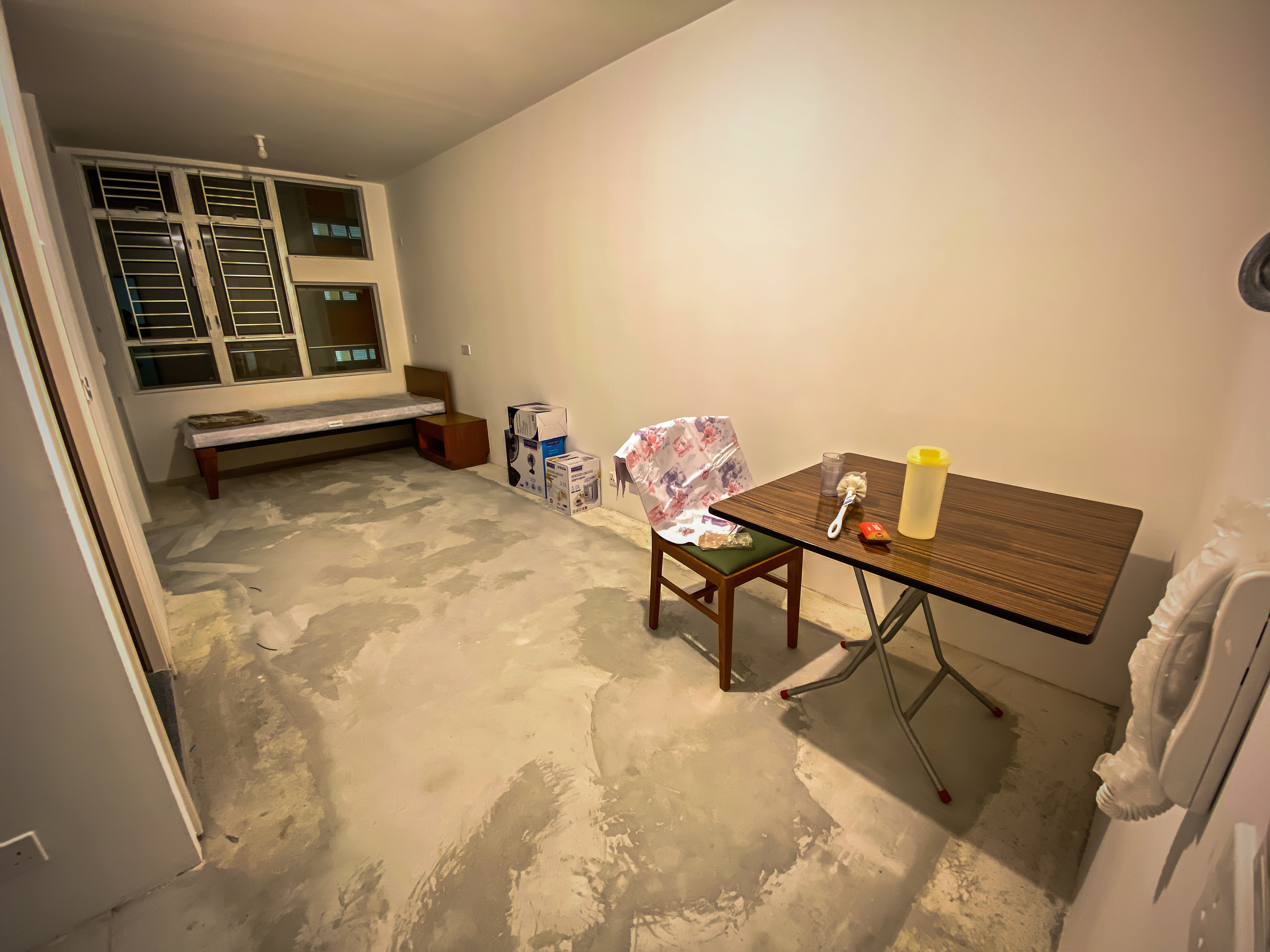
Furnished flats inside the housing estate

On 28 January, pro-Beijing political party Democratic Alliance for the Betterment and Progress of Hong Kong (DAB) met with Chief Executive Carrie Lam and Director of the Chief Executive's Office Eric Chan. DAB lawmaker Lau Kwok-fan quoted Lam as saying that the government pledges not to use Fai Ming Estate or other new housing estates as quarantine camps. In response to the government's decision, Law Ting-tak said on Facebook, "the people of North District, yay!" At a press conference later that day, Lam confirmed that the government is dropping their plans to use unoccupied public housing estates for quarantine purposes following the protests.
