= Luen Wo Hui (constituency) =

- Elected constituency for the North District Council
- Boundary of Luen Wo Hui in North District
- District: North
- Legislative Council constituency: New Territories North
- Population: 20,753 (2019)
- Electorate: 11,132 (2019)

Current constituency
- Created: 1982
- Number of members: One
- Member(s): Chow Kam-ho (Luen Wo United)

Luen Wo Hui is one of the 17 constituencies in the North District, Hong Kong.

The constituency returns one district councillor to the North District Council, with an election every four years. The seat is held by Chow Kam Ho of Luen Wo United as of 2021.

Luen Wo Hui constituency is loosely based on area of Luen Wo Hui, including Grand Regentville, Regentville, Wing Fai Centre, Wing Fok Centre and Fanling Garden in Fanling with estimated population of 20,753.

== Councillors represented ==
Election	Member	Party
1982	Tang Tung	Independent
1988	Pang Cheung-yin	Independent
1990	Pang Cheung-yin	LDF
199?	Pang Cheung-yin	Independent
1999	Chan Fat-hong	DAB
2007	Law Sai-yan	Democratic
2015	Tsang Hing-lung	DAB
2019	Chow Kam-ho	Luen Wo United

== Election results ==
=== 2010s ===
North District Council Election, 2019: Luen Wo Hui
Party	Candidate	Votes	%	±%
Luen Wo United	Chow Kam-ho	4,491	55.97	
DAB	Tsang Hing-lung	3,491	43.51	−8.89
Nonpartisan	Kong Mei-ting	42	0.52	
Majority		1,000	12.46	
Turnout		8,040	72.31	
Luen Wo United gain from DAB		Swing		

North District Council Election, 2015: Luen Wo Hui
Party	Candidate	Votes	%	±%
DAB	Tsang Hing-lung	2,640	52.4	+11.2
Democratic	Law Sai-yan	1,981	39.4	–19.4
Liberal	Andy Liu Ming-kin	413	8.2	
Majority		659	13.0	
Turnout		5,101	50.2	
DAB gain from Democratic		Swing	+15.3	

North District Council Election, 2011: Luen Wo Hui
Party	Candidate	Votes	%	±%
Democratic	Law Sai-yan	2,159	58.8	+10.0
DAB	Tsang Hing-lung	1,512	41.2	−3.9
Democratic hold		Swing		

=== 2000s ===
North District Council Election, 2007: Luen Wo Hui
Party	Candidate	Votes	%	±%
Democratic	Law Sai-yan	1,643	48.8	
DAB	Chan Fat-hong	1,530	45.1	
Independent	Kwan Hon-kwai	207	6.1	
CMPRGU	Yu Kwok-wai	14	0.4	
Democratic gain from DAB		Swing		

North District Council Election, 2003: Luen Wo Hui
Party	Candidate	Votes	%	±%
DAB	Chan Fat-hong	uncontested		
DAB hold		Swing		

=== 1990s ===
North District Council Election, 1999: Luen Wo Hui
Party	Candidate	Votes	%	±%
DAB	Chan Fat-hong	1,467	48.5	
Independent	Chan Hon-lam	956	31.6	
Independent	Tang Chu-tin	568	18.8	
DAB gain from Independent		Swing		

North District Board Election, 1994: Luen Wo Hui
Party	Candidate	Votes	%	±%
Independent	Pang Cheung-yin	1,324	61.6	−2.8
Liberal	Liu Kam-tim	757	35.2	
Independent hold		Swing		

North District Board Election, 1991: Luen Wo Hui
Party	Candidate	Votes	%	±%
LDF	Pang Cheung-yin	851	64.4	−35.6
LDF	Tsui Kam-lun	460	34.8	
LDF hold		Swing		

=== 1980s ===
North District Board Election, 1988: Luen Wo Hui
Party	Candidate	Votes	%	±%
Independent	Pang Cheung-yin	1,253	90.0	
Independent	Tsui Ngai	131	9.4	
Independent hold		Swing		

North District Board Election, 1985: Luen Wo Hui
Party	Candidate	Votes	%	±%
Independent	Tang Tung	609	45.5	−9.1
Independent	Wong Ting	582	43.5	
Independent	Lawrence Tse Lap-fu	140	10.5	
Independent hold		Swing		

North District Board Election, 1985: Luen Wo Hui
Party	Candidate	Votes	%	±%
Independent	Tang Tung	900	54.6	
Independent	Tuen Kin-chung	461	28.0	
Independent	Chan Lok-han	277	16.8	
Independent win (new seat)				
