= Ka Fuk Estate =

Public housing estate in Fanling, Hong Kong

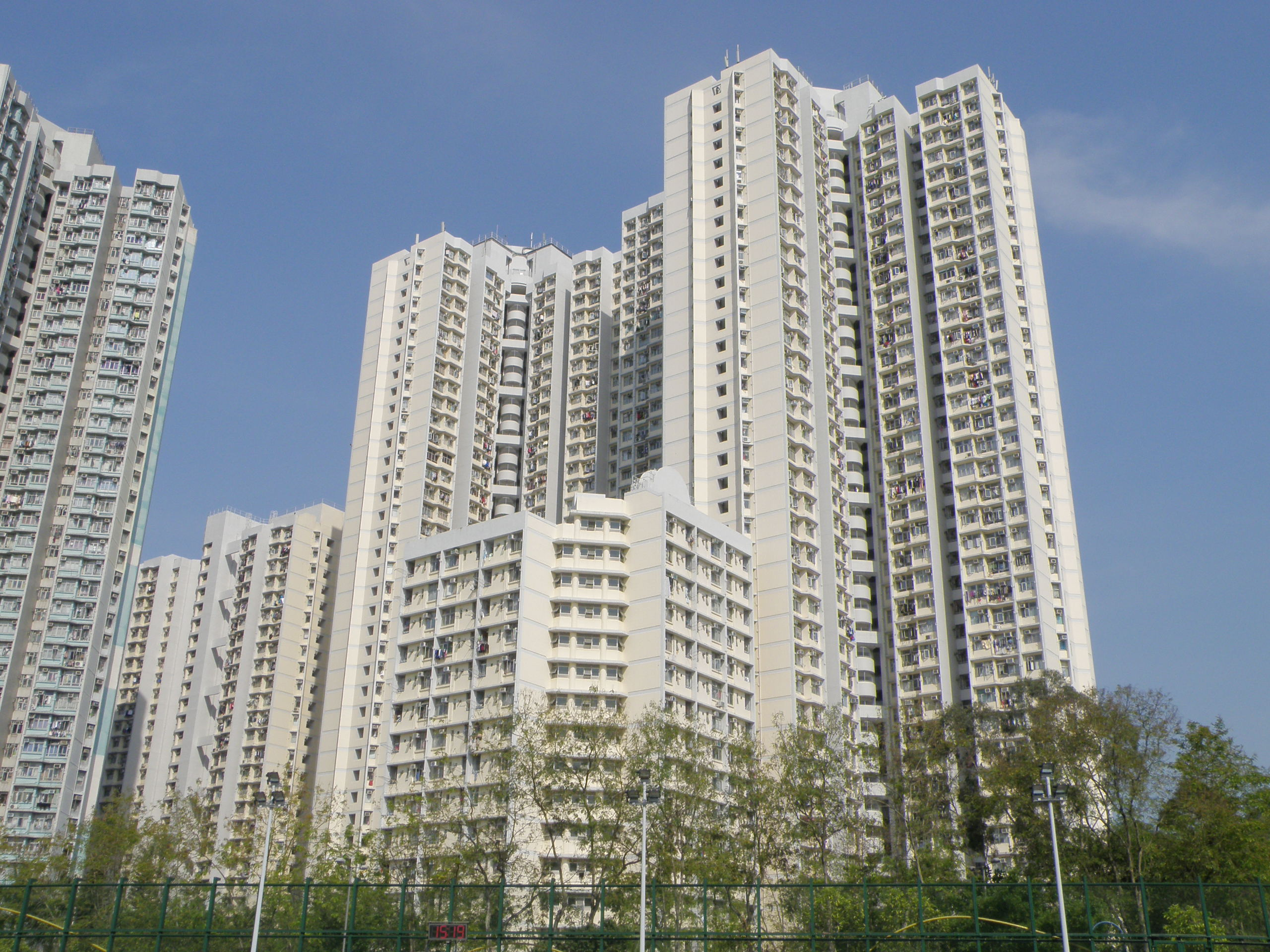
- Ka Fuk Estate
- Interactive map of Ka Fuk Estate

General information
- Location: 8 Chi Ka Lane, Fanling; New Territories, Hong Kong
- Coordinates: 22.4926632°N 114.1345461°E
- Status: Completed
- Category: Public rental housing
- Population: 6,322 (2016)
- No. of blocks: 3
- No. of units: 2,045

Construction
- Constructed: 1994; 32 years ago
- Authority: Hong Kong Housing Authority

Ka Fuk Estate (Chinese: 嘉福邨) is a public housing estate in Fanling, New Territories, Hong Kong, near Fanling Highway. It consists of three residential buildings built in 1994.

Ka Shing Court (嘉盛苑) is a Home Ownership Scheme court in Fanling, near Ka Fuk Estate. It consists of four residential buildings built in 1995.

== Houses ==
=== Ka Fuk Estate ===
Name	Chinese name	Building type	Completed
Fuk Lok House	福樂樓	Harmony 1	1994
Fuk On House	福安樓	Harmony 1 with Harmony Annex 1	1994
Fuk Tai House	福泰樓	Harmony 3	1994

=== Ka Shing Court ===
Name	Chinese name	Building type	Completed
Ka Ming House	嘉明閣	Harmony 1	1995
Ka Fai House	嘉輝閣	Harmony 1	1995
Ka Yiu House	嘉耀閣	Harmony 1	1995
Ka Yeung House	嘉揚閣	Harmony 1	1995

== Demographics ==
According to the 2016 by-census, Ka Fuk Estate had a population of 6,322 while Ka Shing Court had a population of 7,123. Altogether the population amounts to 13,445.

== Politics ==
Ka Fuk Estate and Ka Shing Court are located in Shing Fuk constituency of the North District Council. It is currently represented by Warwick Wan Wo-tat, who was elected in the 2019 elections.

== See also ==
- Public housing estates in Fanling
