= Wah Ming Estate =

Public housing estate in Fanling, Hong Kong

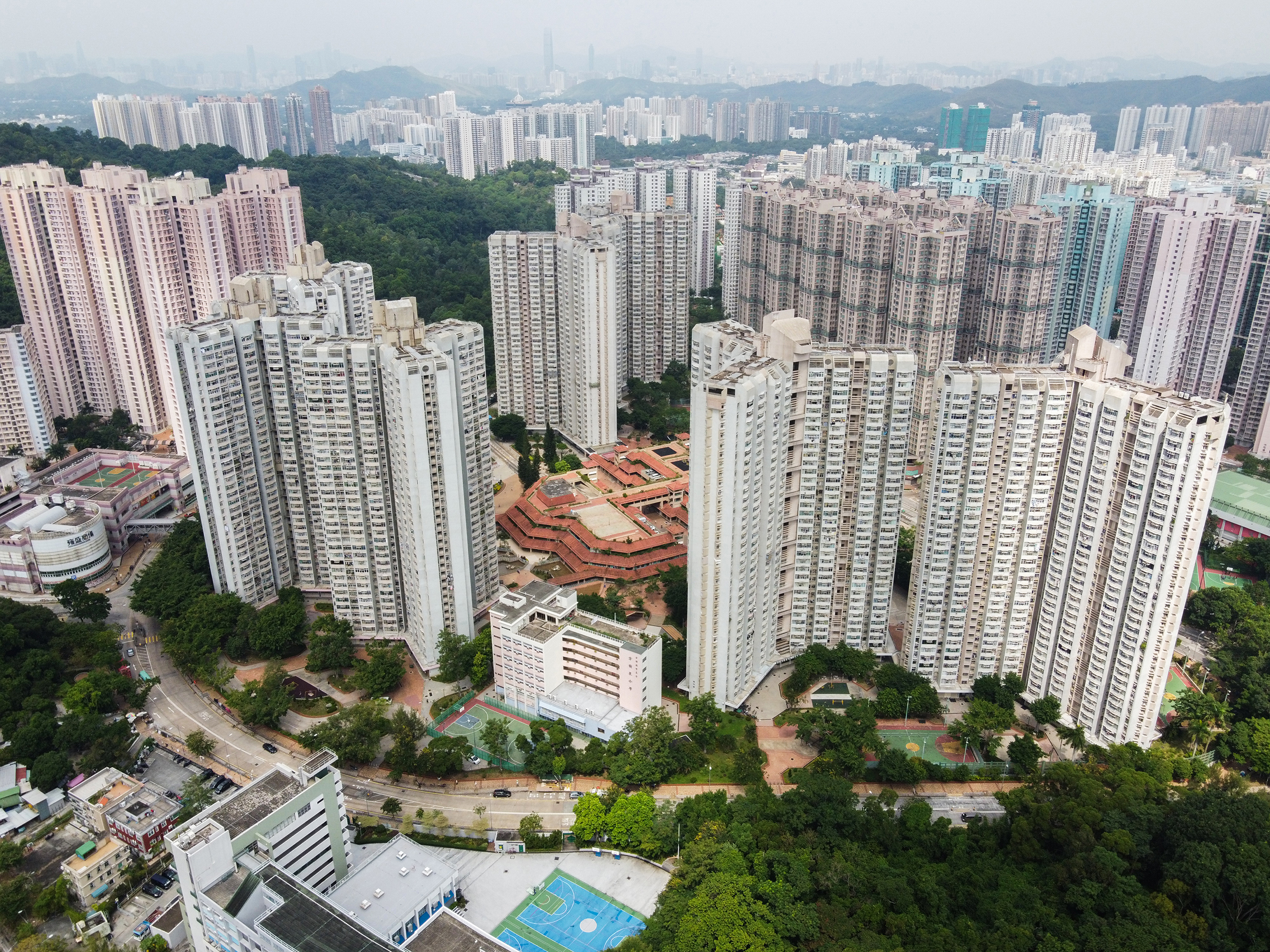
- Wah Ming Estate
- Interactive map of Wah Ming Estate

General information
- Location: 21 Wah Ming Road, Wo Hop Shek; Fanling; New Territories, Hong Kong
- Coordinates: 22.48333°N 114.14043°E
- Status: Completed
- Category: Public rental housing
- Population: 15,611 (2016)
- No. of blocks: 7
- No. of units: 2,476

Construction
- Constructed: 1990; 36 years ago
- Authority: Hong Kong Housing Authority

Wah Ming Estate (Chinese: 華明邨) is a mixed TPS and public housing estate in Wo Hop Shek, Fanling, New Territories, Hong Kong, near Wa Mei Shan and Wo Hing Sports Centre. It consists of seven residential buildings built in 1990. The flats in the estate were sold under Tenants Purchase Scheme Phase 2 in 1999.

Yan Shing Court (欣盛苑) and Cheong Shing Court (昌盛苑) are Home Ownership Scheme courts in Wo Hop Shek near Wah Ming Estate, built in 1993 and 2000 respectively.

Yung Shing Court (雍盛苑 is a mixed public and HOS court in Wo Hop Shek near Wah Ming Estate. It consists of three residential buildings completed in 2000.

== Houses ==
=== Wah Ming Estate ===
Name	Chinese name	Building type	Completed
Lai Ming House	禮明樓	Trident 3	1990
Shun Ming House	信明樓	Trident 3	1990
Tim Ming House	添明樓	Trident 3	1990
Yiu Ming House	耀明樓	Trident 3	1990
Chung Ming House	頌明樓	Trident 4	1990
Fu Ming House	富明樓	Trident 4	1990
Hong Ming House	康明樓	Trident 4	1990

=== Yan Shing Court ===
Name	Chinese name	Building type	Completed
Yan Sau House	欣秀閣	NCB (Ver.1984)	1993
Yan Lai House	欣麗閣	NCB (Ver.1984)	1993
Yan Hei House	欣喜閣	NCB (Ver.1984)	1993
Yan Yuet House	欣悅閣	NCB (Ver.1984)	1993
Yan Yiu House	欣耀閣	NCB (Ver.1984)	1993
Yan Choi House	欣彩閣	NCB (Ver.1984)	1993
Yan Fai House	欣暉閣	NCB (Ver.1984)	1993

=== Cheong Shing Court ===
Name	Chinese name	Building type	Completed
Cheong Ching House	昌靖閣	Concord 1	2000
Cheong Siu House	昌兆閣	Concord 1	2000
Cheong To House	昌濤閣	Concord 1	2000
Cheong Yun House	昌潤閣	Concord 1	2000

=== Yung Shing Court ===
Name	Chinese name	Building type	Usage	Completed
Yung Sui House	雍萃閣	Harmony 1	Rental	2000
Yung Wa House	雍華閣	Harmony 1	Rental	2000
Yung Wui House	雍薈閣	Harmony 1	HOS	2000

== Demographics ==
According to the 2016 by-census, Wah Ming Estate had a population of 15,611, Yan Shing Court had a population of 6,955, Cheong Shing Court had a population of 4,107 while Yung Shing Court had a population of 8,005. Altogether the population amounts to 34,678.

== Politics ==
For the 2019 District Council election, the estate fell within two constituencies. Wah Ming Estate is located in the Wah Ming constituency, which was formerly represented by Chan Wai-tat until July 2021, while Yan Shing Court, Cheong Shing Court and Yung Shing Court fall within the Yan Shing constituency, which was formerly represented by Lam Shuk-ching until May 2021.

== See also ==
- Public housing estates in Fanling
