= Luen Wo Hui =

Area of Hong Kong

Coordinates: 22°29′53″N 114°08′35″E

- Traditional Chinese: 聯和墟
- Simplified Chinese: 联和墟
- Cantonese Yale: Lyùhn Wòh Hēui
Transcriptions
Standard Mandarin
- Hanyu Pinyin: Lián Hé Xū
Hakka
- Romanization: Lien2 Fo2 Hi1
Yue: Cantonese
- Yale Romanization: Lyùhn Wòh Hēui
- Jyutping: Lyun4 Wo4 Heoi1

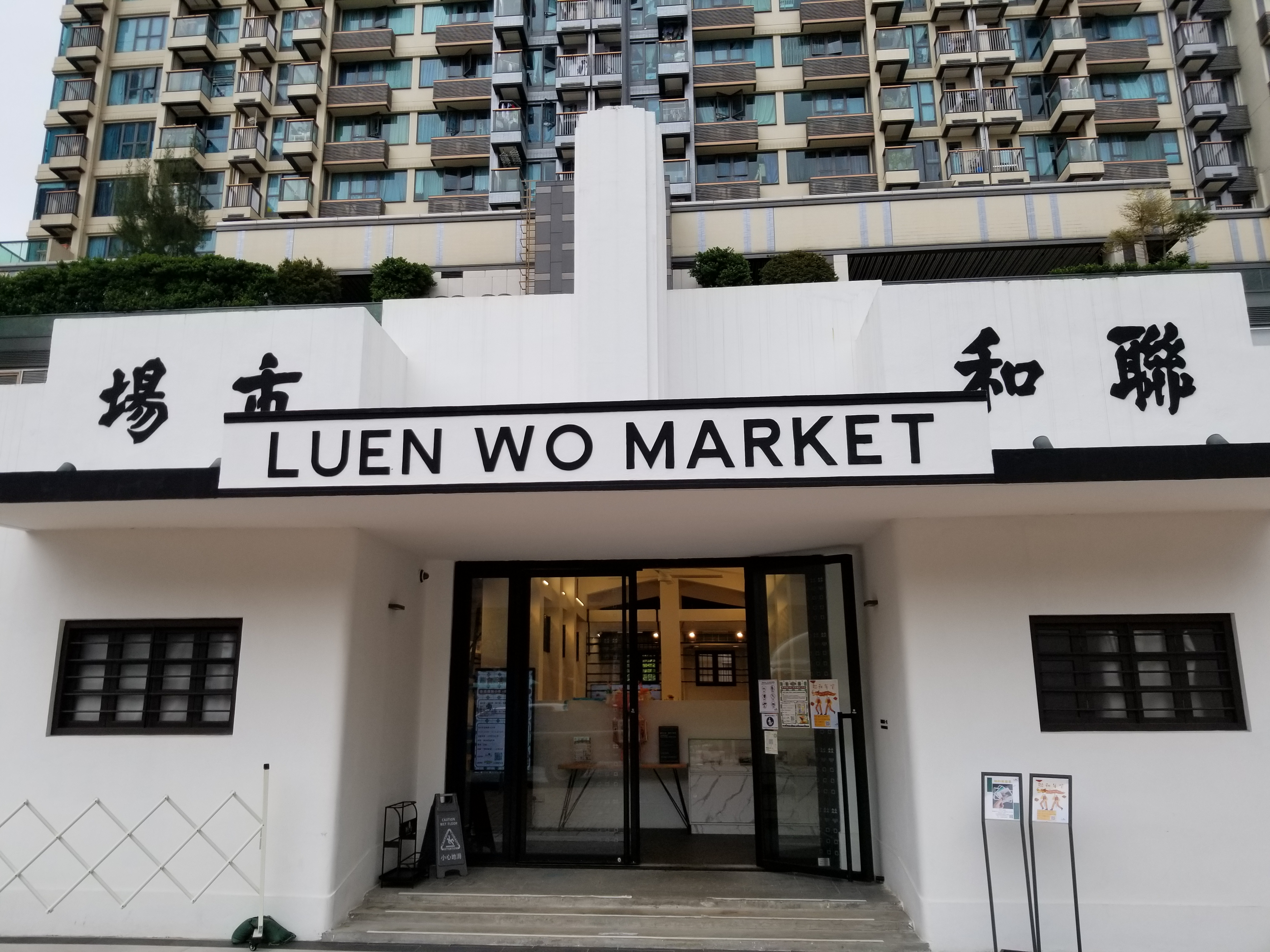
Luen Wo Market building in 2024

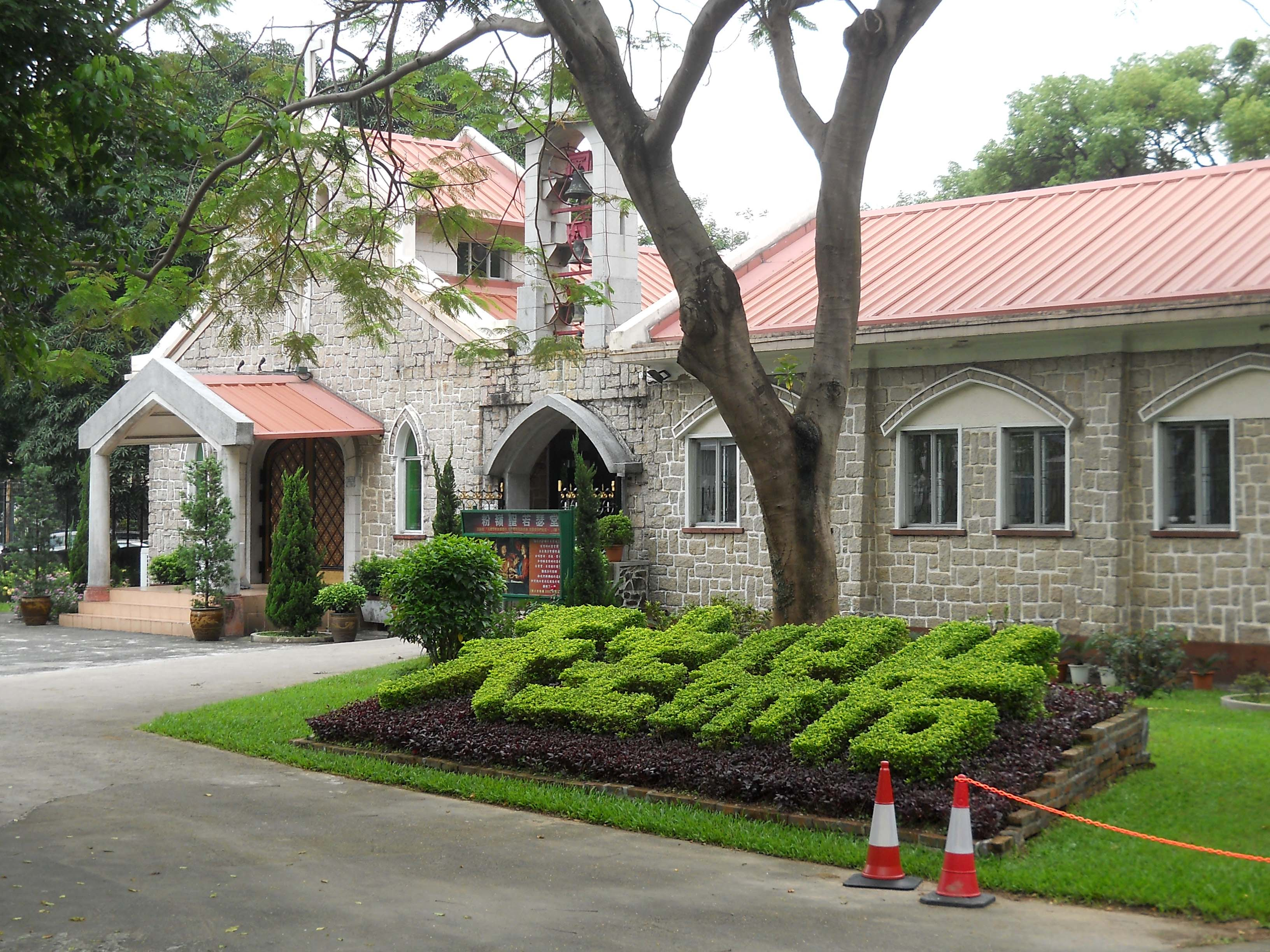
St. Joseph's Church in 2012

Luen Wo Hui or Luen Wo Market is a market town east of Fanling in the New Territories of Hong Kong. It is located northeast of Fanling station.

== Politics ==
For electoral purposes, Luen Wo Hui is part of the Luen Wo Hui constituency of the North District Council. It is currently represented by Chow Kam-ho, who was elected in the local elections.

== History ==
Luen Wo Hui was formerly a market founded by villages in the surrounding area and later became a town. The old market has now ceased to operate and only a few structures are left. A new indoor market to replace the pre-existing market was officially opened in 2002.

New private housing estates have in the last 10 years been built north of the market. Across Sha Tau Kok Road are industrial buildings.

== Market building ==
Luen Wo Market building is listed as a Grade III historic building. Built in 1951, it was part of Batch V of the Revitalising Historic Buildings Through Partnership Scheme.

== See also ==
- Hooked on You, a 2007 film set there. The name of the market building was changed to "Fortune Market" in the film.
