= Pok Oi Hospital =

- Hospital Authority and the board of directors of Pok Oi Hospital

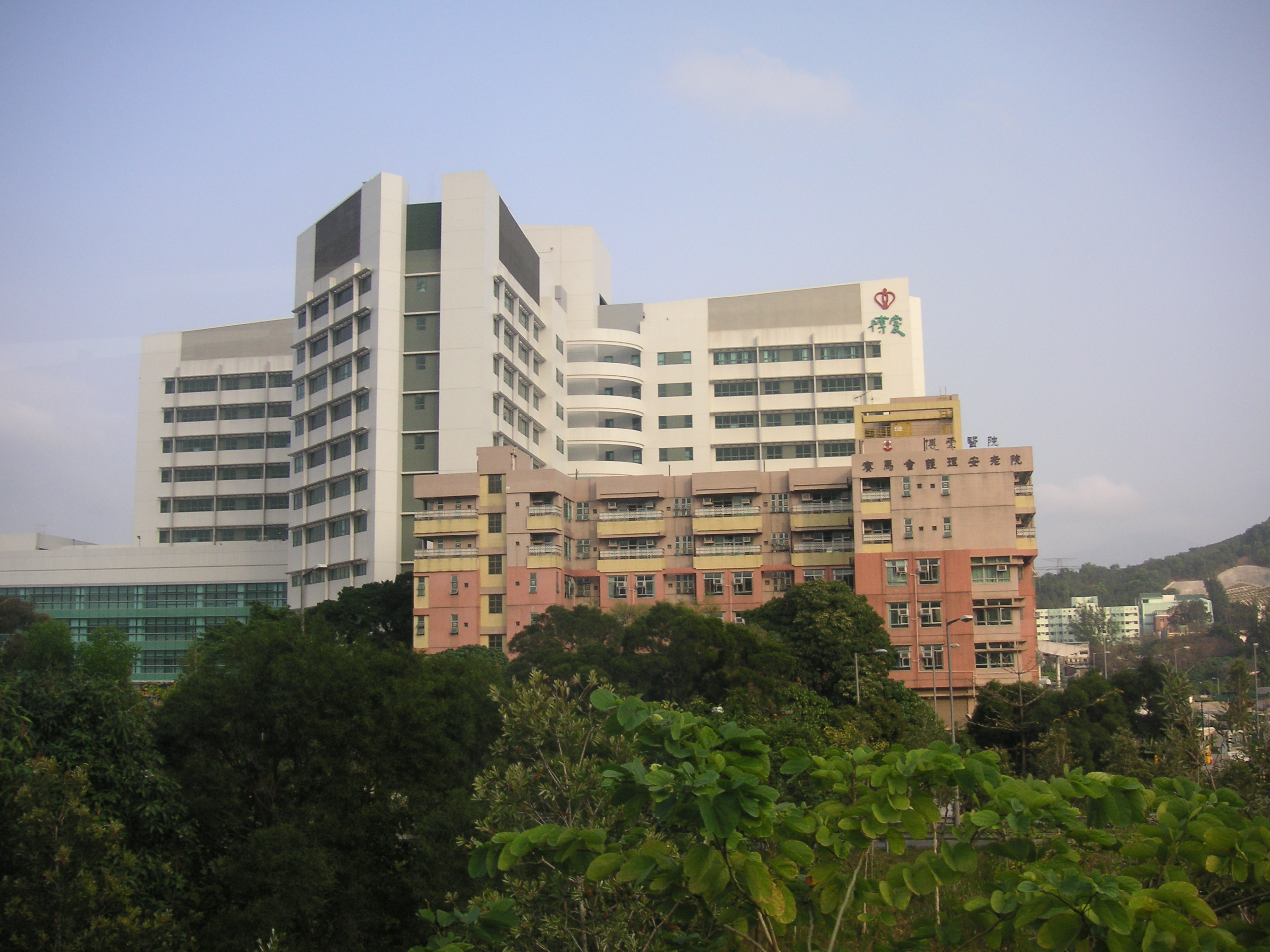
- Pok Oi Hospital in February 2007

- Location within Hong Kong

Geography
- Location: Au Tau, Yuen Long, New Territories, Hong Kong
- Coordinates: 22°26′43″N 114°02′29″E

Organisation
- Care system: Public
- Type: District General
- Network: New Territories West Cluster

Services
- Emergency department: Yes, 24-hour Accident and Emergency
- Beds: 795

Helipads
- Helipad: No

History
- Founded: 1919; 107 years ago

Links
- Website: www3.ha.org.hk/poh/ch/
- Lists: Hospitals in Hong Kong

Pok Oi Hospital (Chinese: 博愛醫院; Cantonese Yale: Bok'oi Yīyún; POH) is a major charitable hospital in Hong Kong, serving the northwest New Territories. Located in Au Tau in Yuen Long, it was founded by residents in 1919 when Yuen Long was a still rural town. The hospital later became a charity organisation, and extended its services to include schools, homes for the elderly, social welfare and other areas.

The hospital is now funded and managed by the charity and Hospital Authority.

== History ==
A local shop owner, Wong Shu-kiu, reportedly conceived the hospital idea in 1913, and a village elder supported it. Pok Oi Hospital was opened in 1919 as a "small dispensary and sick bay". The smallest voluntary hospital, when use of HK$3500 to build, provided free medical services and burials. Pok Oi Hospital was closed during the Japanese occupation. It was reopened by Governor Alexander Grantham on 17 November 1951. By 1954, the hospital offered 30 beds.

On 19 January 1961, Governor Robert Black formally opened a new wing at the hospital. The expansion provided 70 new beds and added the hospital's first operating theatre, a new laboratory, and an x-ray suite. An out-patient department, initially housed in a new two-storey building, was opened on 22 January 1965. Construction of a further expansion, built at a cost of about HK$1.5 million, was begun in 1966. By 1974 the hospital had grown to 162 beds.

Yuen Long was developed into a new town in the late 1970s and 1980s, growing substantially in population during those years. The Pok Oi Hospital accordingly saw a five-phase expansion programme throughout the 1980s. On 27 March 1984 a major part of the second phase of the expansion was completed, with five new storeys added to the central block, contributing 113 more beds (for a total of 331) and another operating theatre. This addition cost HK$21 million. Pok Oi Hospital remained the only charitable hospital in the northern and western New Territories until the delayed opening of Tuen Mun Hospital and North District Hospital in 1990s.

Tin Shui Wai New Town was developed nearby in the 1990s, increasing the burden on Pok Oi Hospital. There was some debate as to whether to expand Pok Oi Hospital or build Tin Shui Wai a hospital of its own. The government announced the redevelopment of Pok Oi Hospital in 1998, enlarging and modernising it. It was substantially rebuilt to a design similar to that of the earlier Tseung Kwan O Hospital. The redevelopment was completed in March 2007. Following strong demand from Tin Shui Wai residents, the Tin Shui Wai Hospital was constructed, and opened in 2017, reducing the burden on Pok Oi Hospital.

To celebrate the centenary of the hospital, Hongkong Post issued a set of commemorative postage stamps on 2 April 2019.

== Facilities ==
As of 31 March 2019, Pok Oi Hospital had 795 beds.

== Transport ==
The hospital is within walking distance of Yuen Long station, on the Tuen Ma line, as well as Yuen Long stop of the light rail system. It is also served by public buses and minibuses.

== See also ==
- Tin Shui Wai Hospital
- Tung Wah Group of Hospitals
