= Joanna Tse =

Hong Kong pulmonologist

Joanna Tse Yuen-Man MBG
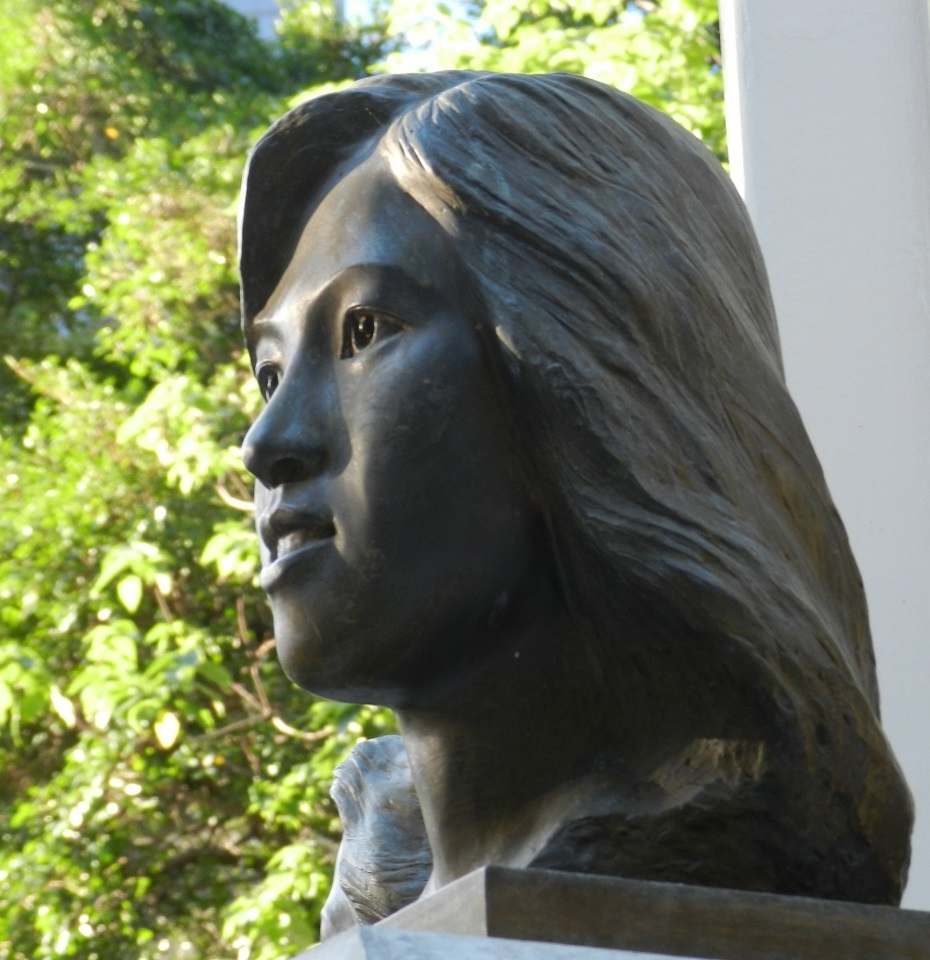
- Bronze statue in the Tai Chi Garden, Hong Kong Park
- Born: March 31, 1968; British Hong Kong
- Died: May 13, 2003 (aged 35); Tuen Mun Hospital, Tuen Mun, Hong Kong
- Cause of death: SARS
- Occupation: Pulmonologist at Tuen Mun Hospital
- Known for: Volunteering to take care of SARS patients, later dying from the disease
- Spouse: Wai-hing Chan

Joanna Tse Yuen-Man (Chinese: 謝婉雯, 31 March 1968 – 13 May 2003) was a Hong Kong pulmonologist who died during the SARS epidemic in Hong Kong after volunteering to save patients with the syndrome.

== Early life ==
Tse was born on March 31, 1968. She grew up in Shek Yam, Kwai Chung, and studied at Salesian Yip Hon Primary School and Tung Wah Group of Hospitals Mrs. Wu York Yu Memorial College, earning eight A-grades in the Certificate of Education Examination in 1985. She enrolled in the Chinese University of Hong Kong Faculty of Medicine and graduated in 1992, working at the Tuen Mun Hospital after graduation.

Tse's husband Chan Wai-Hing, also a doctor, died of blood cancer in May 2002.

On 30 June 2003, Tse was posthumously awarded the Gold Medal for Bravery (MBG) for volunteering to treat SARS patients during the outbreak. Of the six medical personnel who died of SARS, five were awarded the silver medal; Tse was the only gold medal recipient as well as the only woman.

== Anti-SARS action and death ==
In March 2003, SARS broke out in Hong Kong. Tuen Mun Hospital received three SARS patients, but there were not enough pulmonologists in the hospital. Tse volunteered to work in the SARS ward. She and a male nurse, Lau Wing-Kai, had intubated patients with terminal SARS, and were suspected to have been exposed to infected droplets. She was hospitalised on April 3, and was transferred to the intensive care department on April 15. Joseph Sung from the CUHK and Yuen Kwok-yung from HKU had a joint consultation for her, but she died at 4 am (UTC+8) on May 13, 2003.

== After death and memorial ==
On the morning of May 13, the news of Tse's death was first reported on television and radio, which caused the mourning of many Hong Kong citizens. The media successively named Tse "Hong Kong's daughter" (Chinese: 香港的女兒). On May 17, Tse's father wrote a speech to the people of Hong Kong: "I hope that Tse's courage and sacrifice can encourage Hong Kong people to never give up and thanks to all people for their care towards her."

On May 22, Tse's Sabbath was held. Chief Executive Tung Chee-hwa, several government officials and about 2,000 citizens attended. Her body was later buried in Gallant Garden. On the same day, Tung announced that he had previously requested the Finance Committee of the Hong Kong Legislative Council to allocate 200 million HK dollars (US$25.69 million), of which 70 million (US$8.99 million) was to provide assistance to infected medical staff, and 130 million (US$16.7 million) of it was used for training of medical staff. To commemorate Tse, Tung decided to name the fellowship training fund "Dr. Tse Yuen-Man Training Fund" (Chinese: 謝婉雯醫生培訓基金)。

Tse's deeds have been adapted by the Christian organisation The Media Evangelism Ltd. into the television movie "Asian Heroes" and the film "The Miracle Box"; Wong Yin-ping, who attended a school Tse once attended, wrote "A Song to Be Lived" (Chinese: 一首傳世之歌; lit. 'A Song that is to be Kept for Generations') in memory of her. It was composed by Nicholas Tse and sung by Joey Yung.
