= Wo Hop (disambiguation) =

Wo Hop is a restaurant in Chinatown, Manhattan, New York City.

Wo Hop may also refer to:

- Wo Hop Shek, an area in the south of Fanling, Hong Kong
- Wo Hop Shek Public Cemetery
- Wo Hop To, a Hong Kong Triad
