= Fanling station =

MTR station in the New Territories, Hong Kong

Fanling 粉嶺
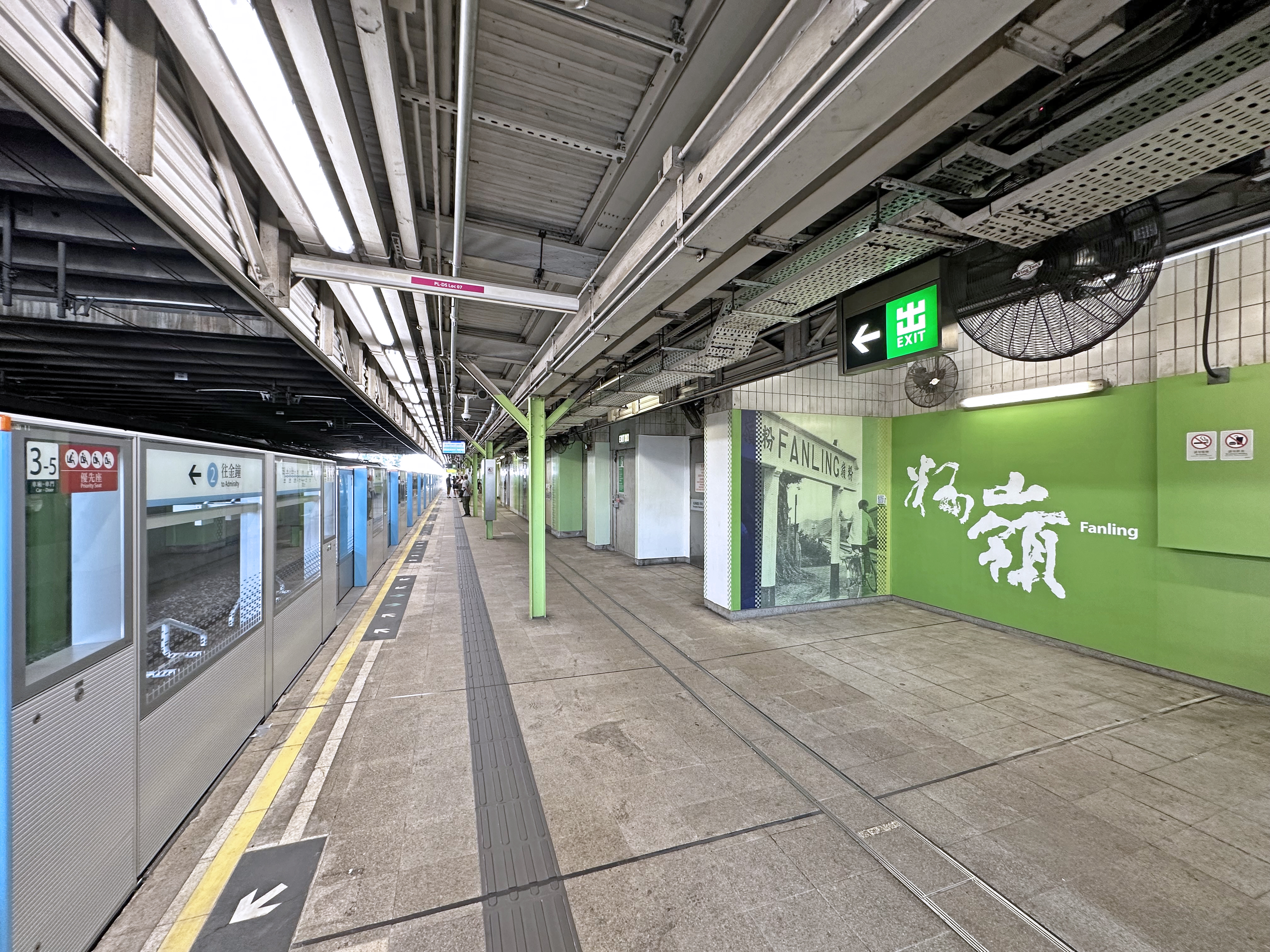
- Fanling Station Platform 2 (May 2024)

Chinese name
- Traditional Chinese: 粉嶺
- Simplified Chinese: 粉岭
- Jyutping: fan^{2} leng^{5}
- Cantonese Yale: Fánléhng
Transcriptions
Standard Mandarin
- Hanyu Pinyin: Fěnlǐng
Yue: Cantonese
- Yale Romanization: Fánléhng
- IPA: [fɐn˧˥lɛŋ˩˧]
- Jyutping: fan^{2} leng^{5}

General information
- Location: Fanling Station Road, Fanling; North District, Hong Kong
- Coordinates: 22°29′32″N 114°08′19″E
- System: MTR rapid transit station
- Owner: KCR Corporation
- Operator: MTR Corporation
- Line: East Rail line
- Platforms: 2 (2 side platforms)
- Tracks: 2
- Connections: Bus, minibus

Construction
- Structure type: At-grade
- Accessible: Yes

Other information
- Station code: FAN

History
- Opened: 1 October 1910; 115 years ago
- Electrified: 15 July 1983; 43 years ago

Services
Preceding station	MTR	Following station
Tai Wo towards Admiralty	East Rail line	Sheung Shui towards Lo Wu or Lok Ma Chau

Former services
Preceding station	KCR	Following station
Tai Po Market towards Kowloon	KCR British section	Sheung Shui towards Lo Wu
Wo Hop Shek Terminus	Wo Hop Shek Branch (1950-1983)	Terminus
Terminus	Sha Tau Kok Branch (1912-1928)	Hung Leng towards Sha Tau Kok
Track layout
Location
- Location within MTR

Fanling (Chinese: 粉嶺; Jyutping: fan^{2} leng^{5}; Cantonese Yale: Fánléhng) is a station on the East Rail line of the Hong Kong MTR. It is next to Fanling Town Centre, and is only a short walk away from Fung Ying Seen Koon, a well-known Taoist temple. The Fanling Highway was built from 1983 to 1987 directly adjacent to the station. The station is located on Fanling Station Road within the Fanling area in North District, New Territories, Hong Kong. Its livery is lime green.

== History ==
Fanling station opened at the same time as the Kowloon–Canton Railway British Section on 1 October 1910.

The station once served as the terminus of the Sha Tau Kok Railway, which ceased operations on 1 April 1928. The Wo Hop Shek branch line was taken out of service in 1983 after electrification along the KCR. Full line electrification was completed on 15 July 1983.

== Station layout ==
U1	Concourse	Exits A, B, customer service centre, shops, automatic teller machine
U1	Footbridge	footbridge to Fanling Town, Pak Wo Road
G
G	side platform, left doors open
G	Platform 1	East Rail line towards Lo Wu or Lok Ma Chau (Sheung Shui) →
G	Platform 2	← East Rail line towards Admiralty (Tai Wo)
G	Side platform, left doors open
G	Fanling Station Road Exit	Exit C, customer service centre, transport interchange

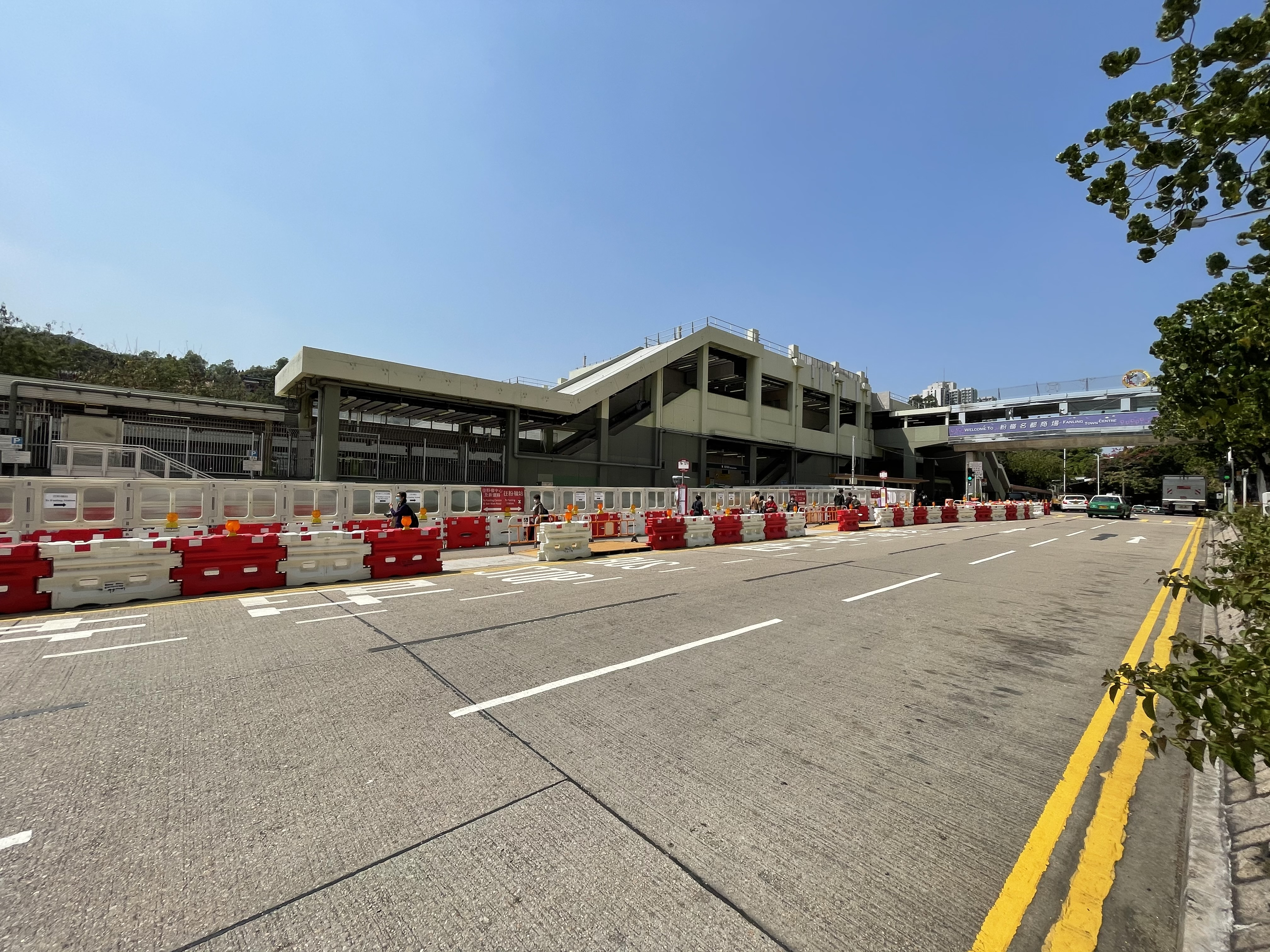
Exterior of Fanling Station

== Exits ==
Concourse

- A: Fanling Town Centre
  - A1: San Wan Road
  - A2: Fanling Station Road
  - A3: Public light bus terminus and taxi stand
- B: Fanling South (Pak Wo Road)

Platform 2

- C: Fanling Town Centre, public light bus terminus and taxi stand, Fanling Public Swimming Pool
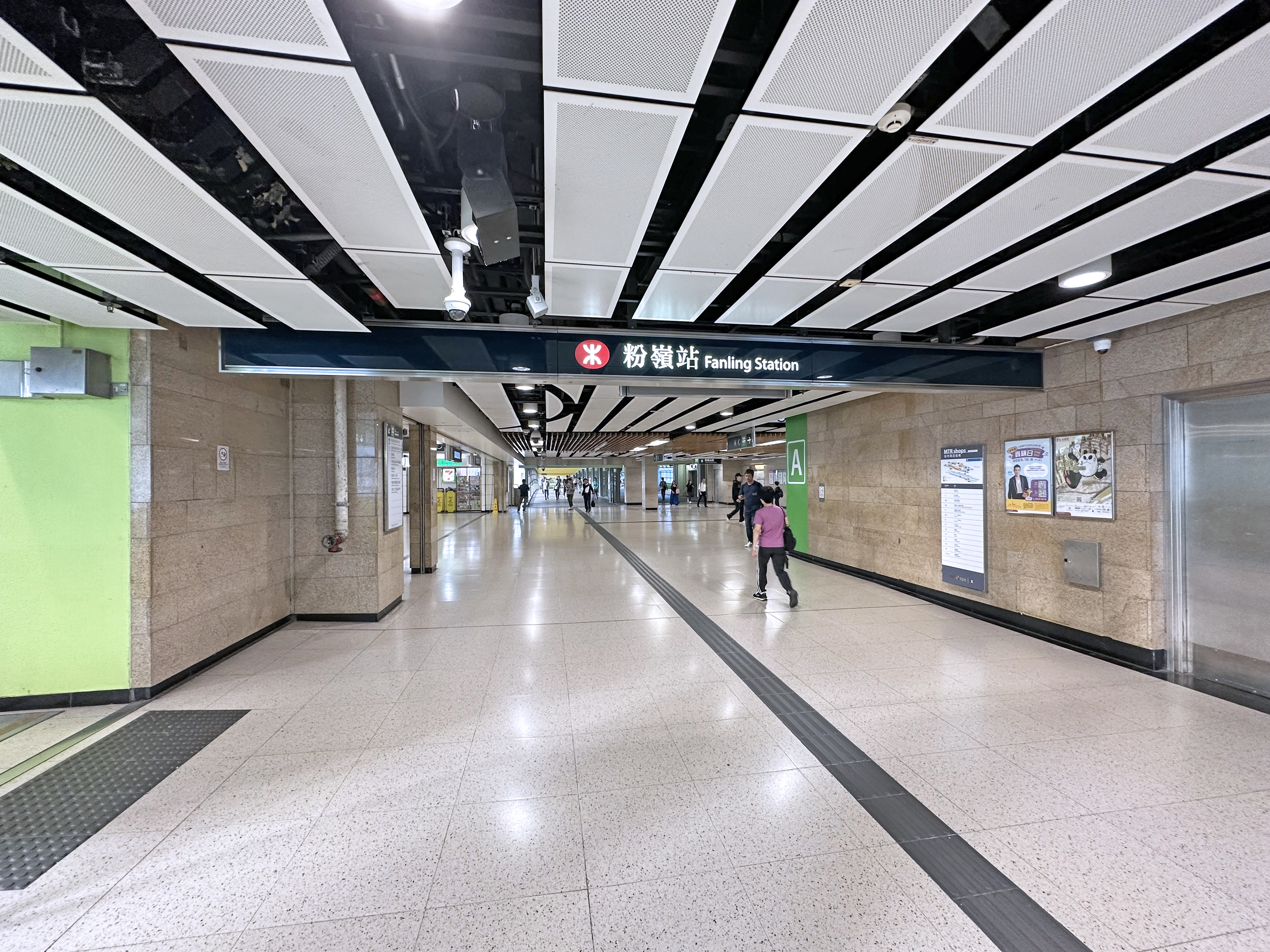
Exit A1

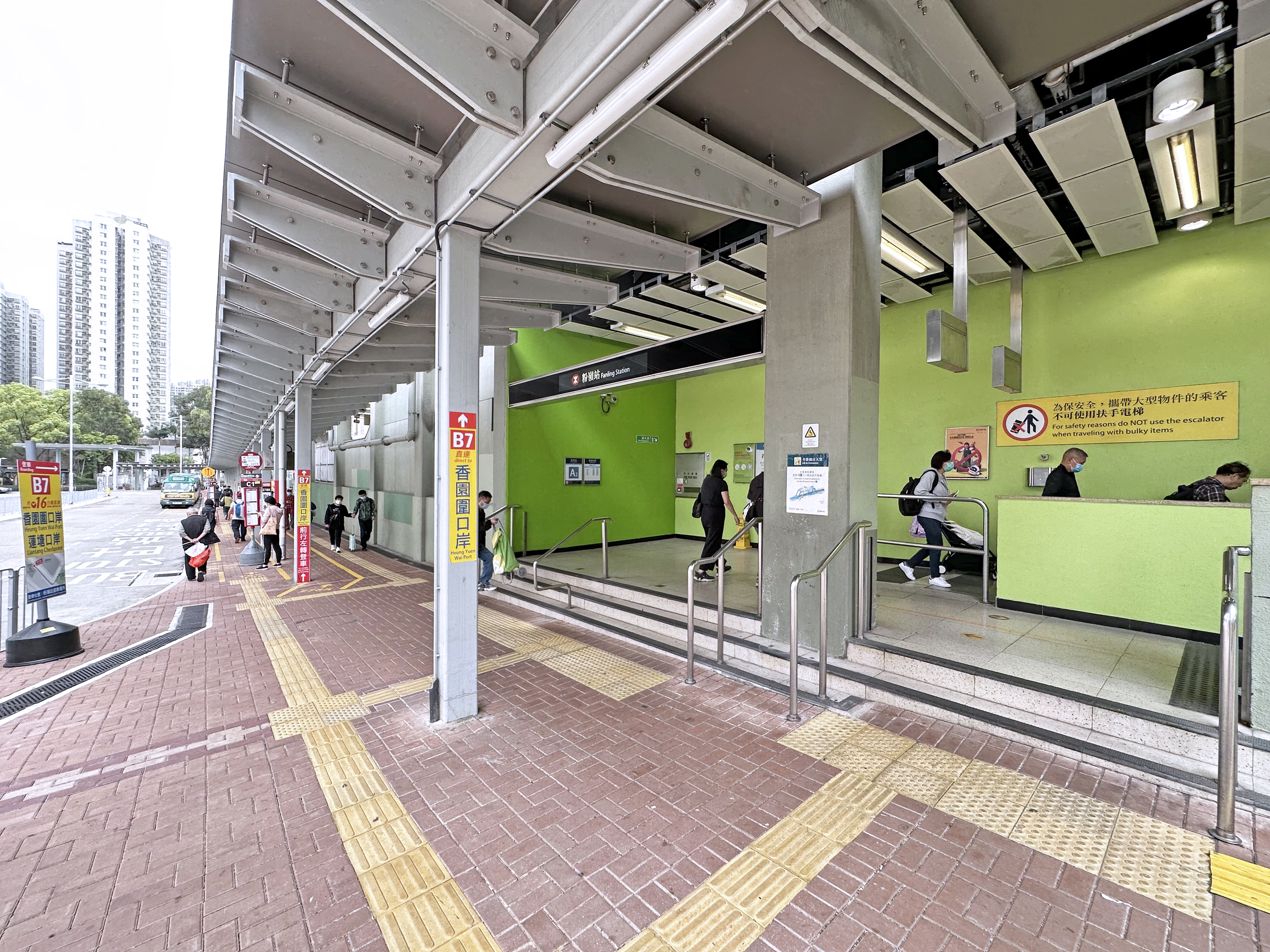
Exit A2

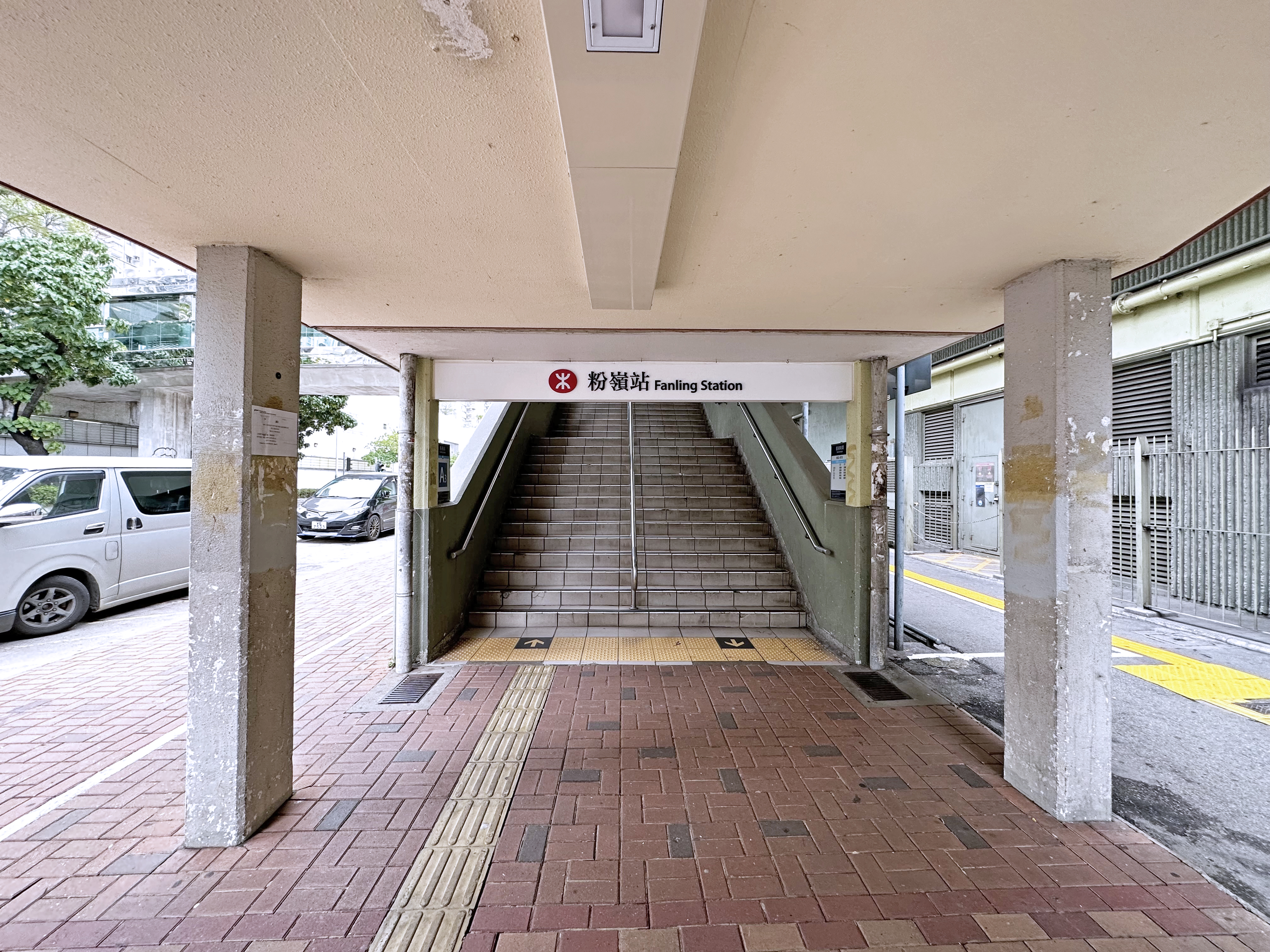
Exit A3

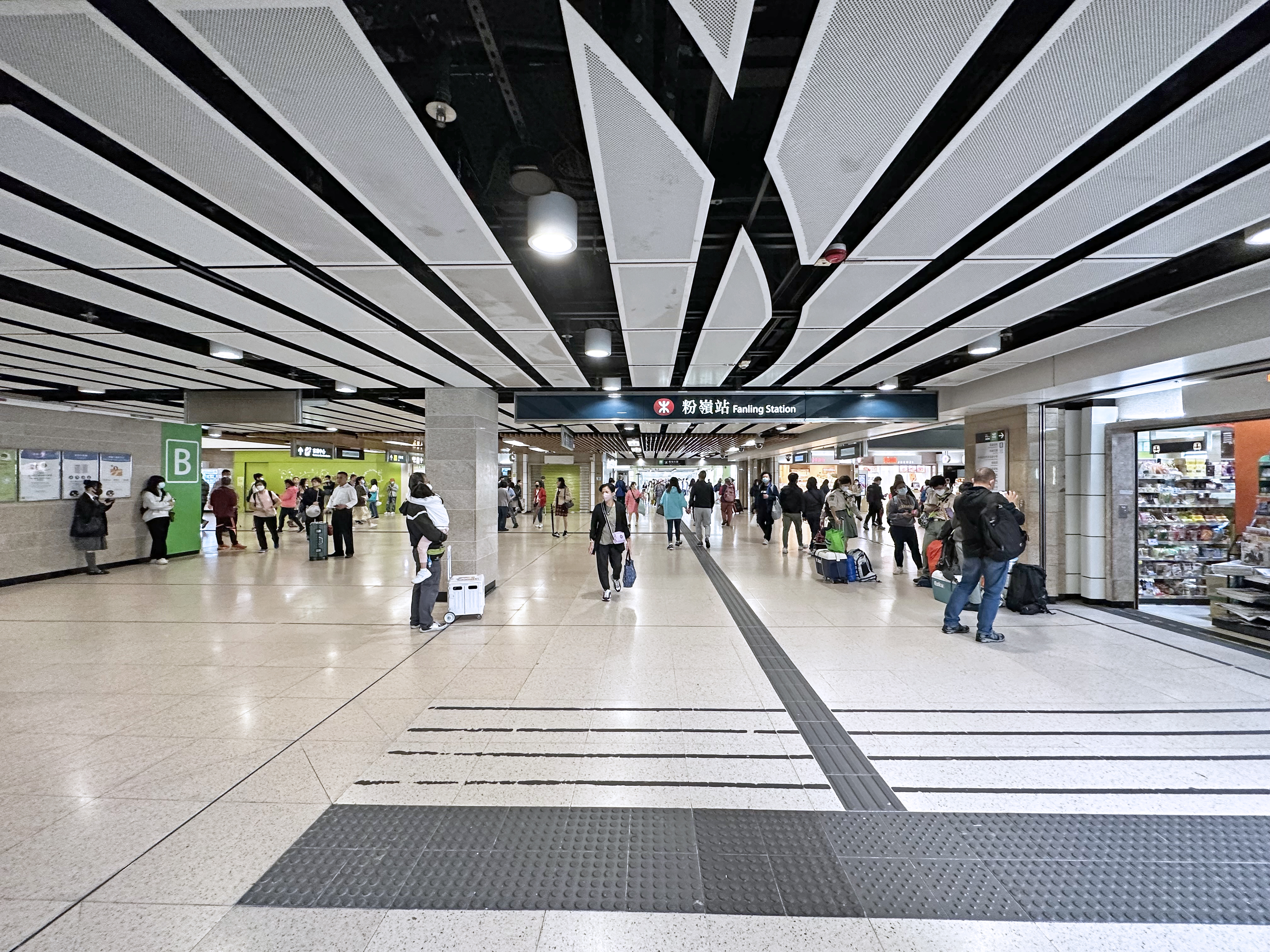
Exit B

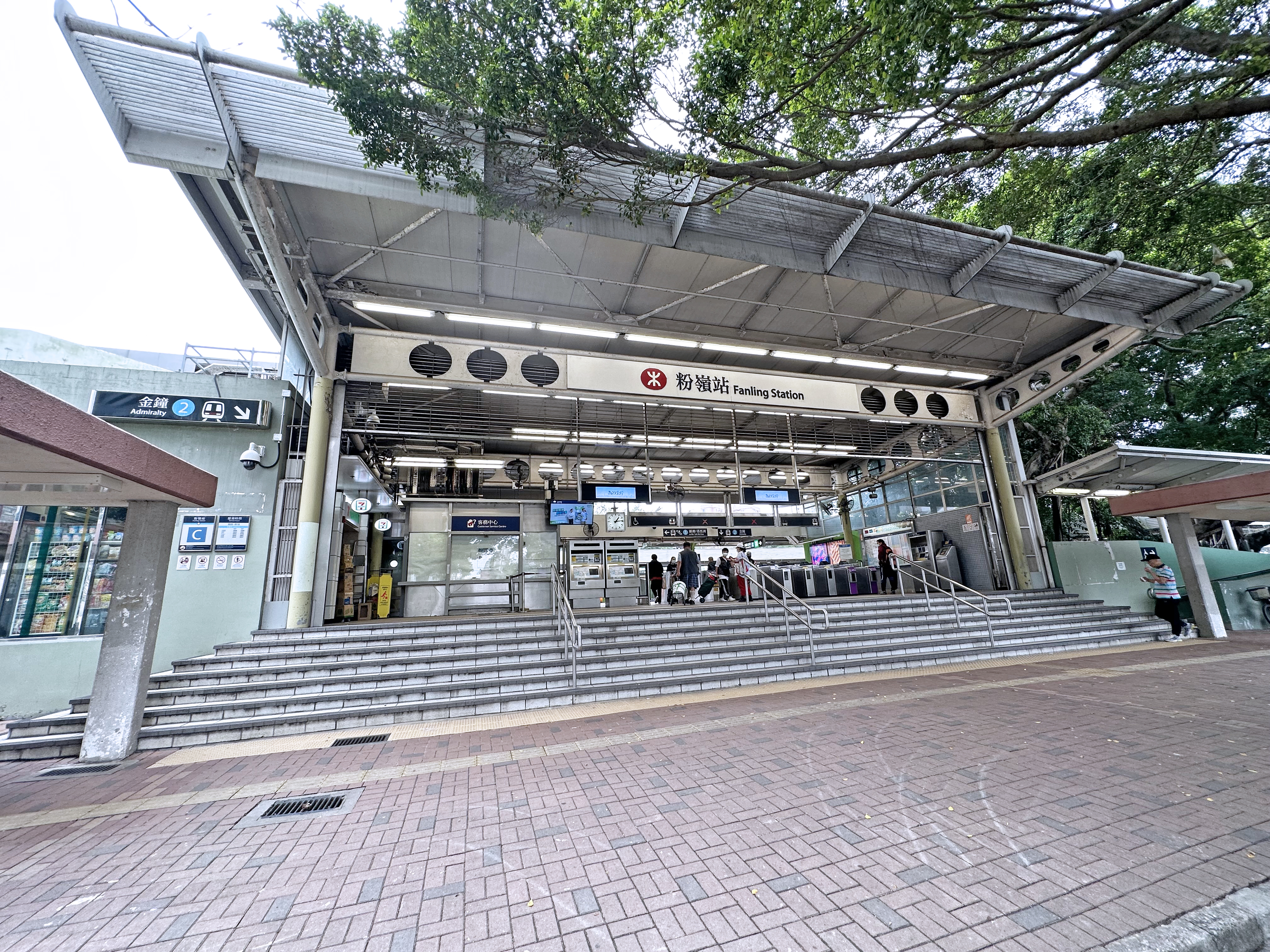
Exit C
