= Tung Wah Group of Hospitals Mrs. Wu York Yu Memorial College =

Coordinates: 22°22′15.672″N 114°8′26.520″E

- 東華三院伍若瑜夫人紀念中學
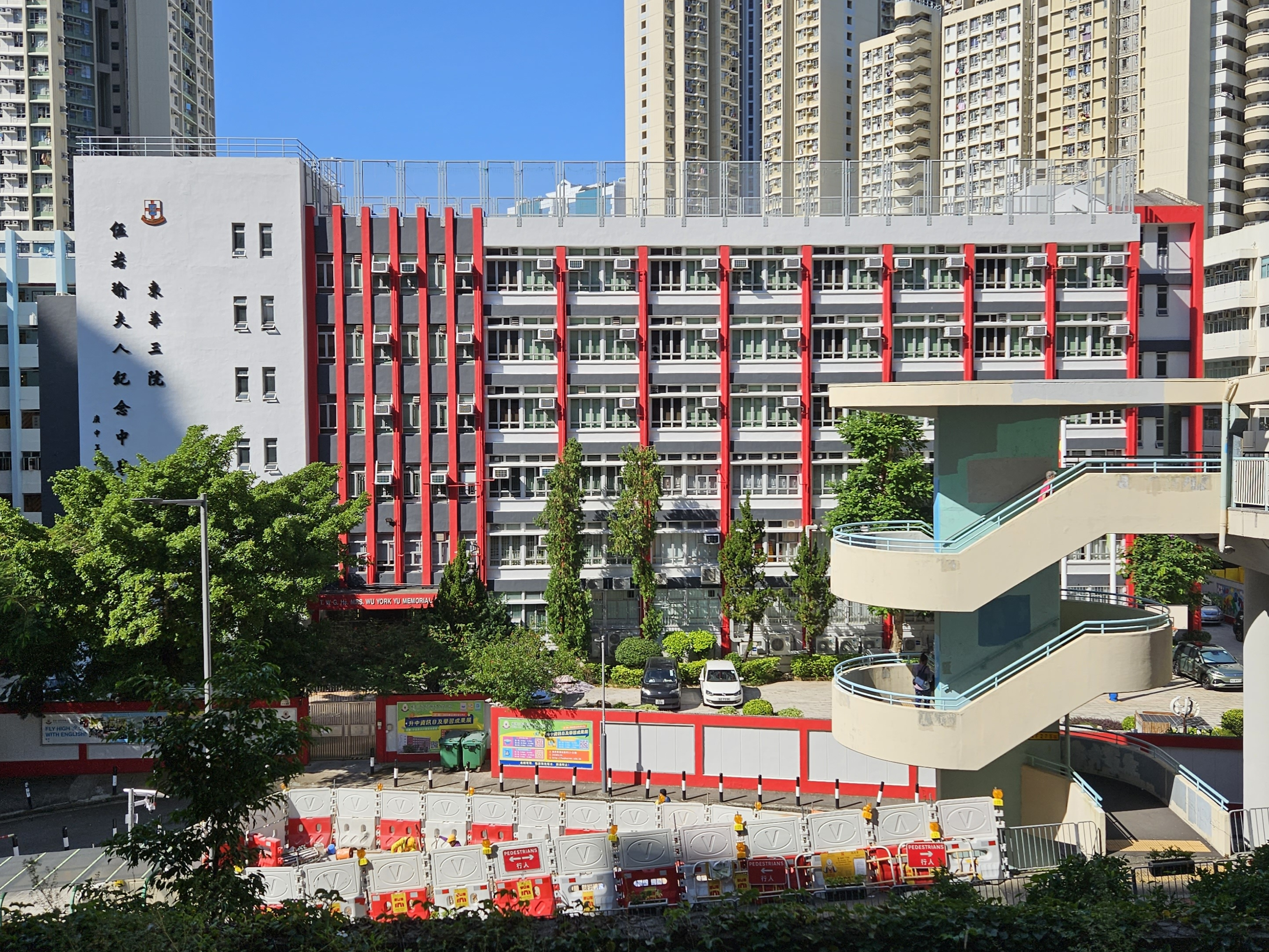

Location
- On Chit Street 13-21; Shek Yam, New Territories; Hong Kong

Information
- Motto: Diligence, Frugality, Loyalty, and Faithfulness
- Established: 1977
- Founder: Wu Yee-sun, Tung Wah Group of Hospitals
- Principal: 黃海軍先生
- Grades: Secondary
- Primary language: English

Tung Wah Group of Hospitals Mrs. Wu York Yu Memorial College (Chinese: 東華三院伍若瑜夫人紀念中學) is a co-educational secondary school established by the Tung Wah Group of Hospitals in 1977. It is located in Shek Yam in the New Territories of Hong Kong. The current principal is Dr. Ye Weiming.

== History ==
The college was founded in 1977 as the sixth Tung Wah Group secondary school established with donations from Wu Yee-sun.

Chinese was the primary language of instruction until 2009, when it changed to English.

== Alumni ==
- Joanna Tse Yuen-Man — a doctor at Tuen Mun Hospital, died of SARS in 2003
- Chan Man-yee — an outstanding female athlete in Hong Kong
- Wang Zhian - Member of the Hong Kong pop music group EO2.
- Yin Li - Miss Friendship of Miss Hong Kong in 1998, former anchor of ATV News Channel.
- Zhang Lisha - Miss Hong Kong No. 2, 2010.
- Tang Baozhen - Miss Hong Kong No. 12 in 2010.
- Luo Yiting - Hong Kong famous basketball player.
- Wu Fuqiao - Hong Kong male singer.
- Guo Yinger - Hong Kong actress and model.
