= Castle Peak Hospital =

- Hospital Authority

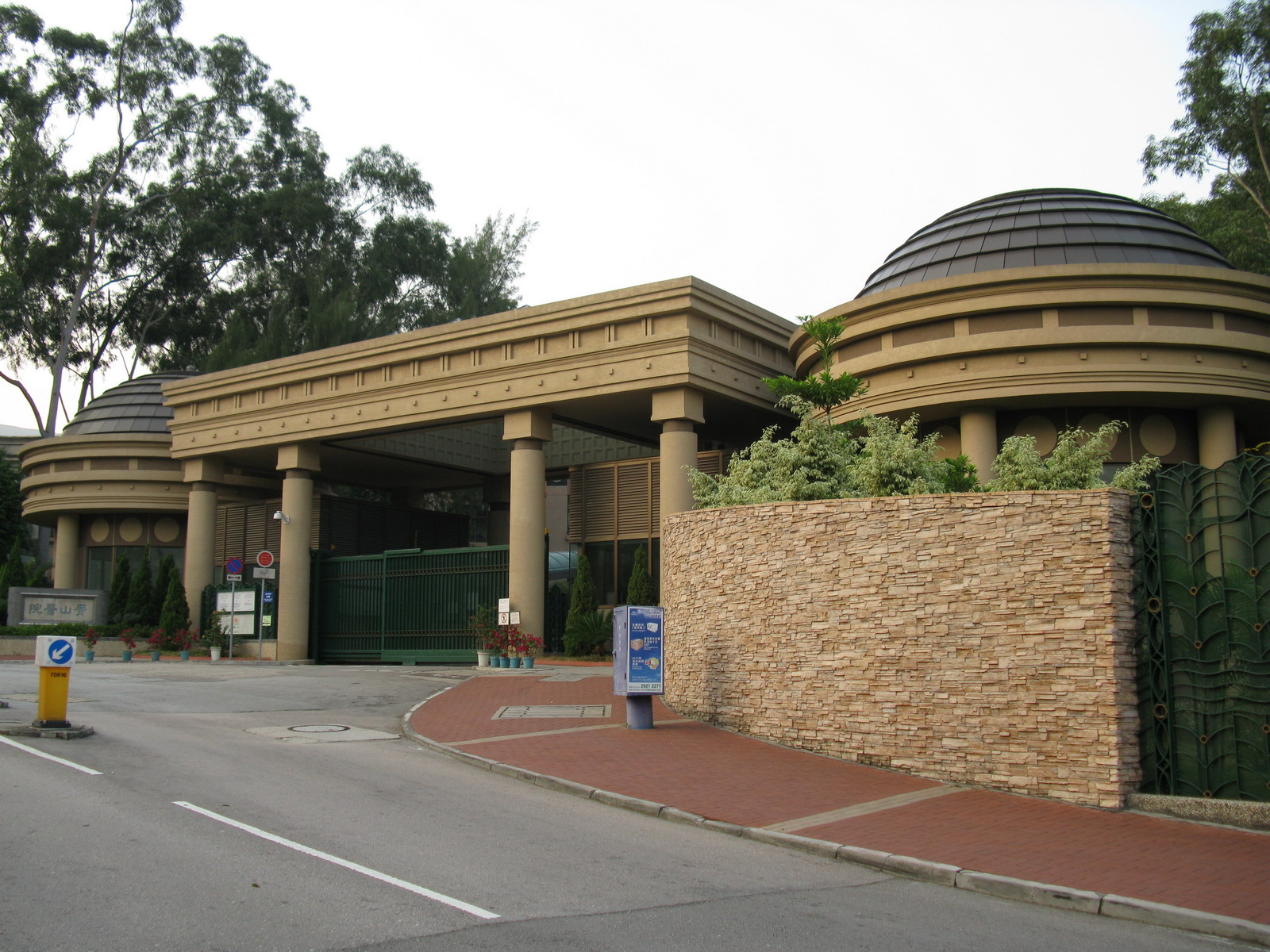
- Main entrance of Castle Peak Hospital

- Location within Hong Kong

Geography
- Location: 15 Tsing Chung Koon Road, Tuen Mun, New Territories, Hong Kong
- Coordinates: 22°24′29″N 113°58′27″E

Organisation
- Type: Specialist
- Affiliated university: Castle Peak Hospital School of Psychiatric Nursing
- Network: New Territories West Cluster

Services
- Emergency department: No Accident & Emergency at Tuen Mun Hospital
- Beds: 1,156
- Speciality: Psychiatric, psychogeriatric services, substance abuse treatments

Helipads
- Helipad: No

History
- Founded: 27 March 1961; 65 years ago

Links
- Website: www3.ha.org.hk/cph/en/Default.asp
- Lists: Hospitals in Hong Kong

Castle Peak Hospital
- Traditional Chinese: 青山醫院
- Cantonese Yale: Chīng sāan yī yún
Transcriptions
Yue: Cantonese
- Yale Romanization: Chīng sāan yī yún
- Jyutping: Cing1 saan1 ji1 jyun2

Castle Peak Hospital (Chinese: 青山醫院; CPH) is the oldest and largest psychiatric hospital in Hong Kong. Located east of Castle Peak in Tuen Mun, the hospital was established in 1961. It has 1,156 beds, providing a wide variety of psychiatric services such as adult psychiatry, forensic psychiatry, psychogeriatric services, child and adolescent psychiatry, consultation-liaison psychiatry and substance abuse treatments. All wards in the hospital are equipped to accommodate both voluntary and involuntary admitted patients.

== History ==
=== Establishment ===
Castle Peak Hospital is the oldest extant psychiatric hospital in Hong Kong. It replaced the older Victoria Mental Hospital on Hong Kong Island as the main public inpatient hospital for the treatment of mental illness. Castle Peak Hospital was opened by the then-Governor Robert Black on 27 March 1961. The 1,000-bed hospital, occupying a 40-acre (16-hectare) site, was spread over 10 buildings. Four two-storey blocks accommodated the patients, who were divided in two sections by gender. The hospital, designed by the Public Works Department to have an "open and pleasant" atmosphere, included teaching and residential facilities for psychiatric nursing students.

=== Redevelopment ===
The hospital completed its redevelopment project in 2006. As the design and construction of the old hospital dated back to the 1950s, after nearly 40 years of heavy utilisation, redevelopment of the whole hospital to upgrade its facilities was necessary in order to keep the hospital functional, and the project commenced in 1992.

The redevelopment of the hospital was carried out in two phases. The Phase I project was funded by a donation of $500 million from the Hong Kong Jockey Club. The Phase II redevelopment, at an estimated cost of $1,470.8 million, was funded by the government. The modernised and improved facilities and environment facilitate treatment and rehabilitation of patients, and their re-integration into the community.

== Description ==
Castle Peak Hospital (CPH) is a psychiatric hospital with about 1,100 beds. It provides general psychiatric admissions for residents of NTW cluster. Forensic inpatient service is provided to the whole of Hong Kong. It also manages a network of psychiatric clinics and a day hospital, providing outpatient and day patient services. Its address is 15 Tsing Chung Koon Road, Tuen Mun, NT.

Most of the wards of the Hospital is "gazetted" (published in HK Government Gazette as a mental hospital under Mental Health Ordinances of HK Law), meaning that the wards of the Hospital admit voluntary and involuntary patients under the Mental Health Ordinance.

== Services ==
The main services provided by Castle Peak Hospital are general psychiatric services, providing care for patients of different age groups and different types of mental illnesses. In addition to General Psychiatry, Castle Peak Hospital provides sub-specialty services in Forensic Psychiatry, Child and Adolescent Psychiatry, Intellectual Disability, Psychogeriatrics, Rehabilitation, Community Psychiatry and Consultation-liaison Psychiatry.

All types of modern psychiatric treatment work are available in hospital, including the use of drugs and other physical methods of treatment, and psychological and social treatment. Multi-disciplinary teamwork is emphasised in the provision of treatment and care for patients. The recent trend is to put emphasis not only on hospital treatment, but also on community psychiatric care. The Hospital is seeking to provide an integrated service, taking hospital care and community care as complementary to one another. Altogether there are 15 male wards and 9 female wards and 2 mixed sex wards. Most patients in the hospital are undergoing intensive rehabilitation in preparation for discharge and some of them are permitted to go out of the hospital in the day time to work during the final stage of their rehabilitation.

CPH is a recognised training centre for trainees in medical, nursing, occupational therapy and other relevant professional fields. Its training program for psychiatric trainees is recognised by the respective Colleges of Psychiatrists in Hong Kong, United Kingdom, Australia and New Zealand.

== In popular culture ==
In Hong Kong Cantonese, due to its historic nature, the name of the hospital (青山; cing1 saan1), and hence Castle Peak (青山), is used both to refer to mental illness and as a slang for "psycho".

== See also ==
- List of hospitals in Hong Kong
