= Siu Lam Hospital =

- Hospital Authority

- Location within Hong Kong

Geography
- Location: 15 Tsing Chung Koon Road, Tuen Mun, Hong Kong
- Coordinates: 22°24′35″N 113°58′29″E

Organisation
- Type: Specialist
- Network: New Territories West Cluster

Services
- Emergency department: No. Accident & Emergency at Tuen Mun Hospital
- Beds: 500
- Speciality: Psychiatry

Helipads
- Helipad: No

History
- Founded: 28 June 1972; 54 years ago

Links
- Lists: Hospitals in Hong Kong

Siu Lam Hospital
- Traditional Chinese: 小欖醫院
- Simplified Chinese: 小榄医院
Transcriptions
Standard Mandarin
- Hanyu Pinyin: Xiǎolǎn Yīyuàn
Yue: Cantonese
- Yale Romanization: Síuláahm Yīyún
- Jyutping: siu2 laam5*2 ji1 jyun6*2

Siu Lam Hospital (Chinese: 小欖醫院; SLH), located in Tuen Mun, is the only hospital in Hong Kong providing comprehensive rehabilitation and infirmary services exclusively for patients with severe intellectual disability aged 16 or above.

== History ==
Siu Lam Hospital was opened on 28 June 1972 by the Executive Councillor, Kenneth Fung Ping-fan. Originally located in Tai Lam Valley, with 200 beds, it was the first hospital to serve patients with severe intellectual disabilities in Hong Kong. It was built with a grant of HK$5.7 million from the Royal Hong Kong Jockey Club.

== Services ==
As of March 2013, the hospital has 500 beds and around 411 members of staff.
