= Death of Lam Yuen-yee =

Lam Yuen-yee MBG (Chinese: 林婉儀; 1984-2021) was a Chief Inspector of the Hong Kong Police Force Marine Region Small Boat Division. Lam died in action on the 25th of September, 2021 near Sha Chau Island in the northwest waters of Hong Kong after a smuggling speedboat slammed into her police interceptor, causing it to capsize causing Lam and three other police officers on board to fall into the sea. While the three officers were rescued shortly after, Lam was reported missing and her body was recovered two days after near the coast of Yi O on Lantau Island.

A ceremony with the highest honours and a funeral procession was held for Lam on 2nd of November, 2021, Lam was laid to rest in the Gallant Garden, at Wo Hop Shek Public Cemetery (an area reserved for civil servants who have died on duty). Many government officials including the then Chief Executive Carrie Lam Cheng Yuet-ngor attended the ceremony. A weekly press meeting with the Chief Executive and the meeting of the Executive Council was cancelled to make way for Lam’s funeral.

On 15 November 2021, Lam was posthumously awarded the Medal for Bravery (Gold) by the Carrie Lam in recognition of her gallantry and selflessness displayed during the operation.

== Career and Legacy in the Marine Region ==
Lam joined the Hong Kong Police Force in 2007, starting her career as a police constable in Tuen Mun Police District. Lam was promoted to an inspector in 2010. Lam joined the Marine Region (colloquially known as the Marine Police) in 2015 and later became the first female supervisor of the Small Boat Division in 2020, leading the maritime unit of the Marine Region. During her tenure, Lam earned her the moniker “Kryptonite of Smuggling” (also translated as the "Smuggling Slayer", where she busted numerous smuggling cases over the years. Earning a record of having intercepted more than 70 speedboats and arrested more than 100 people. In a major anti-smuggling operation led by Lam in August 2020, Lam seized HK$37 million worth of animals and smuggled goods.

During her career, Lam earned two Regional Commanders' Commendations, one Police Commissioner's Commendation (unit), and the "Trailblazer Operation" medal.

== Death and aftermath ==
On 25 September 2021 at around 8 a.m., Lam was leading her team of four on a marine multi-mission interceptor to conduct a regular anti-smuggling operation in northwest waters of Hong Kong, near Chek Lap Kok International Airport. Lam noticed a number of suspected smuggling speedboats around Sha Chau Island and decided to chase one of them. During the pursuit, a speedboat ignored repeated police warnings and crashed to the right stern of Lam’s boat, causing the interceptor to sink and the four officers, including Lam, to fall into the sea. The officers were trapped underneath the speedboat after the collision. Rescuers later found the three other officers but Lam was missing. On the 27th of September, 2021, the body of Lam was recovered near the shore of Yi O on Lantau Island, two days after she fell into the sea. An initial autopsy confirmed that Lam drowned to death.

Her death triggered both the Hong Kong and Guangdong Police’s crackdown on smuggling operations across the border with mainland China. The Police Commissioner of Hong Kong Police Raymond Siu vowed to make the best endeavours to track down the culprit and ramp up crackdowns on smugglers. Until 11 October 2021, a joint operation - among Police, Customs and Excise Department, Food and Environmental Health Department, Health Department, Lands Department and the Government Flying Service, had so far led to the arrests of 365 people, in which 35 were believed to be part of the triad smuggling ring.

On 1 and 2 October 2021 the Guangdong authorities arrested two mainland Chinese men who are believed to have been on the speedboat that rammed the Hong Kong marine police vessel, causing the death of Lam. The two suspects could be tried in the mainland as they were arrested there, and Hong Kong police said the crash took place in mainland waters about 300 to 500 meters away from Hong Kong's waters.

Lam's death also triggered derision from some members of the public. Speaking in a Legislative Council meeting, Secretary of Security Chris Tang Ping-keung said there were eight members from the Hong Kong Disciplined Services who have been being suspended from their duties after they had mocked the death of Lam. Tang said taunts at Lam were cold-blooded and no one should make sarcastic remarks or gloat over casualties, regardless of their political stance. On 12 November 2021, a former Hong Kong police officer was arrested and charged with seditious intent over the online comments he allegedly made about Lam.
