= Tsui Po-ko =

Hong Kong police officer and mass murderer

- Police Portrait of Tsui Po-ko, from the East Kowloon Regional Police Mobile Unit
- Born: 17 May 1970; Shaowu, Fujian, China
- Died: 17 March 2006 (aged 35); Yau Tsim Mong District, Hong Kong
- Cause of death: Gunshot wounds
- Occupation: Police constable
- Spouse: Lee Po-ling (1997–2006; his death)
- Children: 1 daughter
- Call sign: PC53533
- Criminal charges: Bank Robbery, Murder

Tsui Po-ko
- Chinese: 徐步高
Transcriptions
Standard Mandarin
- Hanyu Pinyin: Xú Bùgāo
Yue: Cantonese
- Jyutping: ceoi4 bou6 gou1

Tsui Po-ko (Chinese: 徐步高) (17 May 1970 – 17 March 2006) was a police constable of the Hong Kong Police Force, bank robber and serial killer. He is one of Hong Kong's most well known serial killers.

He was killed during an ambush on two police constables in a Tsim Sha Tsui subway which led to a shootout. The inquest into the events leading up to his death aroused great interest in Hong Kong, as it unravelled a string of intriguing events, and revealed the secret life of a policeman with a delusional state of mind. On 25 April 2007, the five-person jury in the coroner's court unanimously decided that Tsui was responsible for injuring one and killing two fellow police officers and a bank security guard, on three occasions. The jury returned a verdict that he had been "lawfully killed" by fellow officer Tsang Kwok-hang in a shootout. The inquest lasted 36 days, one of the longest ever inquests in Hong Kong.

Assistant Police Commissioner John Lee said that this was "an exceptional case", while the case's coroner called it "the most difficult" inquest for a jury he had ever encountered.

== Biography ==
Tsui was the elder of two children born in Shaowu, Fujian, and arrived in British Hong Kong in 1978 with his mother. His father and brother arrived a year later. He attended the Kwun Tong Government Secondary Technical School (now Kwun Tong Kung Lok Government Secondary School). After graduation, he had several jobs, including a stint with the Royal Hong Kong Regiment.

Tsui joined the Royal Hong Kong Police in 1993; he regarded it as a well-paid job with good benefits, and was a police constable for 13 years until his death in 2006. He was an outstanding cadet at the Hong Kong Police College, having won the "silver whistle".

Tsui was an excellent marksman, scoring full marks in target shooting and simulated bank robbery shooting in 1993. From 2001 to 2005, in the tests held three times a year, he scored a perfect 48 points. According to shooting range records, Tsui was a left-handed shooter but had also claimed that he was ambidextrous to a superior.

From 1996 to 2001, Tsui made four attempts at the 'Police Constable/Senior Police Constable to Sergeant Promotion Qualifying Examination', He scored 68 marks in his 2000 attempt which earned him an interview, but his stubbornness and difficulty in communication meant that he was never promoted, and had given up applying for promotion by 1999. From then on until 2003, Tsui applied three times to join the Airport Security Unit, but failed in every attempt. He failed a personality assessment during the first attempt, and subsequently failed because of insufficient fitness. Between 2002 and 2005, he was attached to the Tsing Yi district.

Tsui's wife, Lee Po-ling, worked at the Social Welfare Department as a social security assistant. The couple met when she worked as a sales assistant at the airport, and Tsui was also stationed there. They married in 1997 and had a daughter in 2000.

In October 2001, Tsui and his wife appeared together in a couples version of Who Wants to Be a Millionaire? on ATV and won HK$60,000 and stated that they would donate some of the money to charity.

Tsui was an avid sportsman and Oxfam Trailwalker, and was known to participate in marathons and paragliding. Unbeknownst to his wife, he would also frequent massage parlours, karaoke bars, and prostitutes in Mong Kok and Shenzhen. Tsui was a habitual heavy gambler and was known to have made a HK$75,000 wager on Japan to win the 2004 Asian Cup final at odds of 2.8:1 on 7 August 2004.

=== Murder of police constable ===
In March 2001, Tsui murdered constable Leung Shing-yan (Chinese: 梁成恩) and stole his revolver. The 24-year-old Leung had been on the force for five years.

At 12:05 on 14 March 2001, Lei Muk Shue Police Station received a call regarding a noise complaint from a flat at Shek Wai Kok Estate. Leung responded to the call alone as his partner was still having lunch. His final radio call was received at 12:25 when he reported that he had arrived at the flat and nobody was responding to his knocks. He was subsequently attacked, struggling with his assailant to prevent his revolver being snatched, but was shot five times at close range. Leung took three bullets in the head and two in the back at Flat 552, Shek To House Block B. Under police guard, paramedics wearing bulletproof vests rushed Leung to Yan Chai Hospital where he was declared deceased upon arrival. His revolver, a fully loaded Smith & Wesson Model 10 4 Inch heavy barrel type revolver, a speedloader, loaded with six .38 Special bullets were missing.

The noise complaint was likely bogus and was made from a burner phone. The police suspected that the officer was lured to the scene for his firearm. Heavily armed police locked down the building and mounted a search. Some 3,000 people, of which 2,000 were police officers, were interviewed by the police but the perpetrator escaped detection. Later, forensic tests found that the DNA on a mask left at the crime scene matched Tsui's.

Leung is survived by his parents and a younger brother and sister. He was engaged and his wedding was scheduled for May. His funeral was attended by top government officials including Chief Executive Tung Chee-hwa and Police Commissioner Tsang Yam-pui. Leung was buried at Gallant Garden. In 2002, he was posthumously awarded the Medal for Bravery (Silver) in recognition of his courage and "gallantry of an extremely high order".

=== Bank robbery ===
On 5 December 2001, Tsui carried out an armed bank robbery of the Hang Seng Bank branch at Belvedere Garden in Tsuen Wan.

At 12:10, masked and alone, he burst into the bank. Security Guard Zafar Iqbal Khan, aged 31, struggled with the man. Khan was shot three times in the head, body and wrist. Khan cocked his Remington shotgun during the robbery after being shot twice, but did not manage to fire before his death. Tsui fled the bank with HK$490,000 and US$1,000, entering Castle Peak Road and then into the Belvedere Garden shopping arcade before escaping through another exit. Police entered the shopping arcade and launched a manhunt but failed to catch the suspect.

The police located several domestic helpers who witnessed the robber removing his balaclava following the robbery and produced a facial composite image of the suspect.

The perpetrator was described as a man with short hair and about 1.8 m tall, whom Assistant Police Commissioner Yam described as a "calm, cold-blooded and brutal robber". A HK$2 million reward was issued. Immediately following the robbery the police noted that the murder weapon appeared to be a police service revolver. It was later discovered that Tsui matched the description of the perpetrator as captured on closed-circuit television; key pieces of evidence were a red T-shirt, Mizuno brand shoes and the fact that footage showed the killer to be a left-handed gunman. He was placed near the scene by the police; Tsui boarded a bus from Cheung Shun in Kwai Chung at 11:11 using an Octopus card issued to his wife; and boarded a minibus bound for Tsung Kwan at 11:53. A red T-shirt carrying a similar distinctive logo as captured on CCTV was found at Tsui's home after his death. The T-shirt, bearing the logo of the Yinchuan International Motor-cycle Travel Festival was a gift to Tsui by the club secretary during his visit to the show in 2000. An expert witness identified the T-shirt as having been worn inside-out during the robbery. Forensic ballistics later identified the gun used in the robbery as the police service revolver taken from police officer Leung Shing-yan in 2001.

Zafar Iqbal Khan is survived by four children and wife, who lived in Pakistan at the time of his death. A ceremony attended by his relatives, friends and bank chairman Vincent Cheng was held at the Kowloon Masjid and Islamic Centre on 7 December before his body was returned to Pakistan later in the day. Khan was posthumously awarded the Medal for Bravery (Gold) for "selfless bravery of the highest order", which was accepted on his behalf by his wife.

=== Financial irregularities ===
An investigation by the Criminal Intelligence Bureau into Tsui's financial status from January 2000 to March 2006 revealed he had a total of 19 personal banking and investment accounts hidden from his wife, the total assets of which amounted to a total of HK$2,977,513. Seven personal and 12 investment accounts were opened under his name around mid-February in 2002 using a friend's address. Between February 2002 and October 2004, Tsui deposited HK$557,718 into the 19 accounts. All transactions were in cash. It was reported that Tsui was active in foreign exchange market, commodities, securities, funds, and margin trading, and had lost a total of HK$371,982 in those investments.

Tsui and his wife bought one flat in August 1997 and paid HK$574,800 in cash. Two years later, he bought a flat at Tung Chung Crescent with a HK$396,173 down payment, paying monthly installments of HK$17,778 for a first and a second mortgage. The mortgages were paid off in just five years, with HK$388,151 in 2001 and HK$500,000 in 2004.

The police alleged that the transactions were inconsistent with a constable's salary and that the HK$500,000 in unexplained cash would be consistent with the amount stolen during the heist in 2001.

=== Ambush of police constables ===
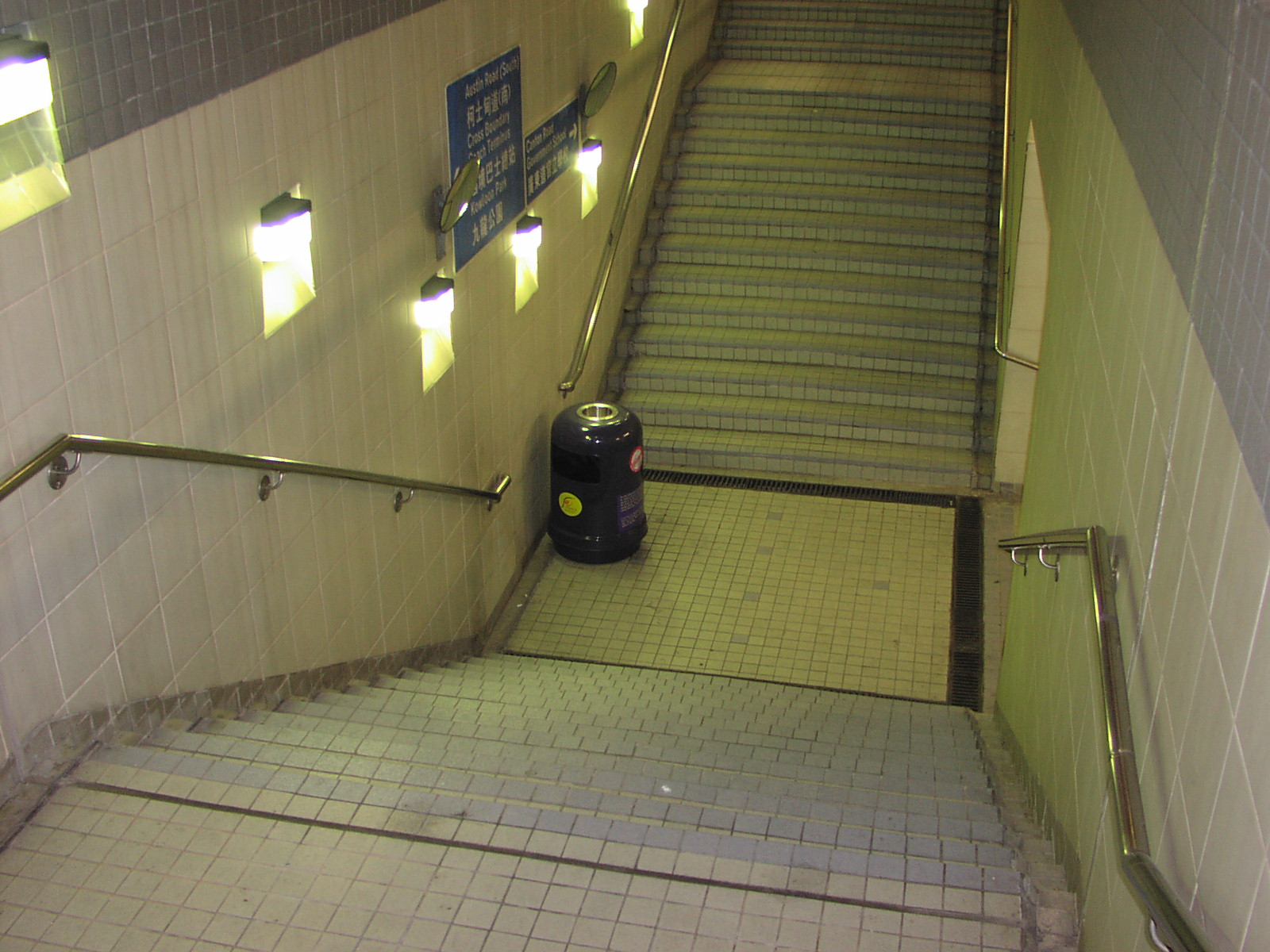
The pedestrian subway where the ambush and shootout took place

Near 1am on 17 March 2006, two police constables – 28-year-old Wilson Sin Ka-keung (冼家強) and 33-year-old Tsang Kwok-hang (曾國恒) – were ambushed by Tsui while on patrol in a pedestrian subway in Tsim Sha Tsui and Kwun Chung. Sin reported seeing Tsui lurking on the northern stairs of the subway and attempted to approach him. Tsui subsequently fired upon both officers, striking Sin in the head and left leg, and Tsang in the head. The constables returned fire, with Tsui was hit by five shots to the torso and head. Tsang and Tsui succumbed to their wounds and were pronounced dead at Queen Elizabeth Hospital, while Sin would survive the incident. The revolver used by Tsui in the shootout was confirmed to be the service revolver taken from Leung and used in the heist in 2001.

The police force held a funeral service for Tsang on 4 April 2006, and his body was buried at Wyant Garden. Sin was awarded the Medal for Bravery (Gold) for his actions and wrote a book about his experience.

== Mental state ==
As the inquiry continued, Tsui was found to be an ambitious officer who often topped his class and did well in assessments. However, he was often denied promotions or opportunities to join elite units such as the Airport Security Unit.

He was not media shy, as shown demonstrated by his appearance on Who Wants to Be a Millionaire? and was happily photographed when he won the chance to buy his flat in a draw and during the 1 July March in 2004 where he was dressed in traditional Chinese funeral style clothing ("披麻戴孝").

An associate professor of social science at the City University of Hong Kong suggested that Tsui, like many criminals, did not know how to face frustration, and chose instead to take an illegal path in obtaining socially approved goals, such as money, prestige or recognition. It was suggested that the police force should pay more attention to talented officers who fail to gain promotion, and recommended that there should be independent and confidential psychological counselling services for such troubled or frustrated officers.

A Federal Bureau of Investigation criminal profiler believed that Tsui's behaviour fit into most of the definitions of schizotypal personality disorder, while an expert from the Queensland University of Technology said Tsui's personality profile matched that of a serial killer who believed he was destined to change the world, attempting to rise above his self-perceived unremarkable life and playing God by taking lives.

== Legacy ==
The Tsui Po-ko case has inspired some film and television productions, including:

Documentaries

- Anatomy of a Crime: "HK's Rogue Cop"

Fiction

- Mad Detective, a 2007 film
- A Great Way to Care 《仁心解碼》, a 2009 TVB series
- The Men of Justice, a 2010 ATV series
- Shades of Rogue, a 2014 short film
