= NTWC =

NTWC may refer to:

- National Tsunami Warning Center, tsunami waring center in the United States
- New Territories West Cluster, hospital cluster under the Hospital Authority in Hong Kong
