= Gallant Garden =

Cemetery in People's Republic of China

Coordinates: 22.478399°N 114.136432°E

浩園
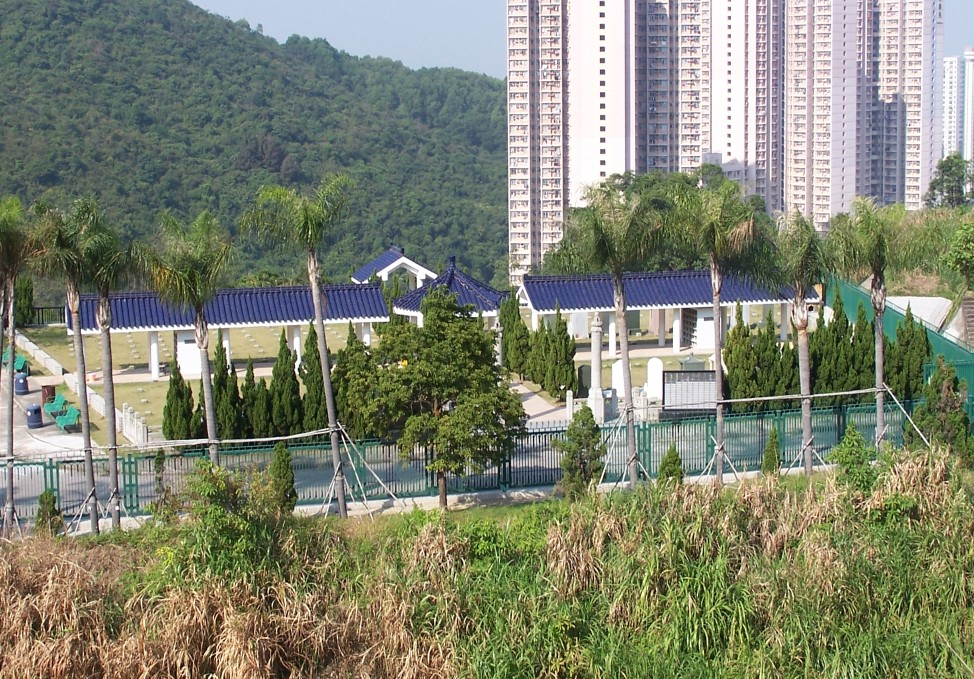
- Gallant Garden
- Interactive map of 浩園

Details
- Established: 1996
- Location: Wo Hop Shek
- Country: Hong Kong
- Type: Restricted
- Size: 1,600 square metres (0.40 acres)
- No. of graves: 110 +285 urn spaces/niches

Gallant Garden (Chinese: 浩園), in Wo Hop Shek Public Cemetery at Wo Hop Shek, Hong Kong, was established in November 1996 for civil servants who lost their lives on duty. In 2000, permanent earth burial was extended to both civil servants and non-civil servants who died with exceptional bravery while on duty. It has an area of 1,600 m^{2} (17,200 ft²) and is currently maintained by Food and Environmental Hygiene Department. It has 110 land burial spaces, 165 urn spaces, and a columbarium of 120 niches. There is also a large Buddhist-Taoist monastery built near the cemetery.

The majority of those interred are police officers and firefighters fallen on duties, but several medical personnel who contracted and died from SARS while treating sufferers from the disease are also buried in the cemetery.

== Interments at Gallant Garden ==
1. 1983 關耀煇 (died at 27): Royal Hong Kong Police Force traffic police officer killed in a traffic accident while on duty
2. 1987 陳潤良 (died at 30): Hong Kong Fire Services firefighter captain who fell during a blaze in Tsuen Wan
3. 1989 陳政瑜 : Hong Kong Fire Services firefighter captain killed by a blaze in Mongkok Sun Hing Building
4. 1990 岑凱傑 (died at 25): Royal Hong Kong Police Force officer killed by a suspect in Mei Foo Sun Chuen
5. 1996 廖熾鴻 (died at 41): Hong Kong Fire Services firefighter who died during a fire in the Garley Building
6. 1997 吳禮光 (died at 35): Hong Kong Fire Services firefighter who died during training
7. 1998 王永基 (died at 39): Hong Kong Police Chief Inspector who died during annual physical training examination
8. 1998 陳阿文 (died at 50): A staff member from the Marine Department who died from an accidental fall during work at Stonecutters Island
9. 1998 黃英才 (died at 39): Acting senior Customs officer who died from an accidental fall while inspecting a container truck at Lok Ma Chau on 12 April 1998
10. 1998 蔡孝濂 (died at 33): Hong Kong Fire Services medic who died while on duty in a traffic accident on Lamma Island
11. 1998 林錦榮 (died at 35): A Water Supplies Department staff member who died in a traffic accident
12. 1999 江榮發 (died at 39): Hong Kong Police marine police officer stationed at the Sai Kung marine police east headquarters who was killed when a truck tipped over
13. 1999 黃生根 (died at 45): A worker of the Regional Council who died from a traffic accident while on duty
14. 2000 梁錦光 (died at 43): An Immigration Department senior officer who died from a fire started by an arsonist at Immigration Tower. He was the first civil servant permitted to be buried permanently in Gallant Garden .
15. 2000 吳栢明 (died at 25): Hong Kong Police traffic police officer hit by a vehicle while on duty
16. 2001 梁成恩 (died at 25): Hong Kong Police constable killed by off-duty constable Tsui Po-ko in Tsuen Wan Shek Wai Kok Estate (Tsui later killed another constable in Tsim Sha Tsui in 2006, at which time he was himself shot dead)
17. 2001 趙順安 (died at 28): An off-duty Hong Kong Fire Services firefighter who drowned while attempting to rescue a distressed teenager out in the sea in Sai Kung District
18. 2002 馬樂民 (died at 28): Hong Kong Police Constable who died during annual physical training examination
19. 2003 劉永佳 (died at 38): A nurse contracted the SARS virus from a patient he was taking care of at Tuen Mun Hospital. He died as a result of SARS (non-civil servant)
20. 2003 梁寶明 (died at 47): An on-duty Hong Kong Police senior inspector of police who drowned attempting to save a person during a flood at Ta Kwu Ling
21. 2003 謝婉雯 (died at 35): A doctor who died from contracting SARS at Tuen Mun Hospital on 13 May 2003 (non-civil servant)
22. 2003 鄧香美 (died at 36): A hospital assistant who died from contracting SARS at Union Hospital (non-civil servant)
23. 2003 劉錦蓉 (died at 48): A hospital assistant who died from contracting SARS at Union Hospital (non-civil servant)
24. 2003 王庚娣 (died at 53): A Prince of Wales Hospital assistant who died from contracting SARS
25. 2003 鄭夏恩 (died at 30): A doctor from Tai Po Hospital died from contracting SARS (non-civil servant)
26. 2003 陳文狄 (died at 32): An officer from the Government Flying Service who died during the B-HRX crash at Pak Kung Au
27. 2003 黃傑康 (died at 24): A Hong Kong Police traffic police officer who died from a traffic accident while on duty
28. 2003 彭富國 (died at 35): A pilot from the Government Flying Service who died in the B-HRX crash at Pak Kung Au
29. 2003 吳峻山 (died at 31): A Hong Kong Police police constable who died while in training
30. 2004 陳業升 (died at 28): A Hong Kong Police traffic police officer who died from a traffic accident at Gascoigne Road flyover while he was responding to a traffic accident report
31. 2004 張振威 (died at 40): A Hong Kong Fire Services firefighter captain who lost his life while on a mission to rescue people trapped in a plaza's manhole at Shau Kei Wan
32. 2006 曾國恒 (died at 33): A Hong Kong Police constable killed by off-duty constable Tsui Po-ko in Tsim Sha Tsui. He was buried on 4 April 2006 (Tsui previously killed another constable in Tsuen Wan Shek Wai Kok Estate in 2001)
33. 2006 黃少鵬 (died at 44): A Hong Kong Police police sergeant who died from previous gunshot wounds he suffered at Aberdeen while on duty
34. 2007 黃家熙 (died at 27): Hong Kong Fire Services firefighter killed by a flashover in Texaco Road, Tsuen Wan. He was buried on 15 June 2007. - Hong Kong Fire Services
35. 2008 蘇志豪 (died at 31): A Hong Kong Police traffic police officer was driving a police motorcycle to escort VIPs to Sheung Yue River for 2008 Olympic Equestrian events and died en route when he encountered a traffic accident.
36. 2008 陳兆龍 (died at 25): A Hong Kong Fire Services firefighter killed in Cornwall Court Fire. Along with 蕭永方(Siu Wing-fong), they found two survivors trapped on the top of the building. Both gave their oxygen breathing apparatus to those survivors even when they continue to battle the blaze. Both died due to smoke inhalation - Hong Kong Fire Services
37. 2008 蕭永方 (died at 46): A Hong Kong Fire Services firefighter killed in Cornwall Court Fire. Along with 陳兆龍(Chan Siu-lung), they found two survivors trapped on the top of the building. Both gave their oxygen breathing apparatus to those survivors even when they continue to battle the blaze. Both died due to smoke inhalation - Hong Kong Fire Services
38. 2009 陳家偉 (died at 51): A Hong Kong Police Station Sergeant killed while on duty in a traffic accident at Argyle Street.
39. 2018 林海雲 (died at 51): A Hong Kong Police police senior constable killed while preparing to pack up after handling an earlier traffic accident was hit by an incoming truck.
40. 2021 林婉儀 (died at 37): A Hong Kong Police Marine Small Boat Division Inspector died in the line of duty during an anti-smuggling operation near Sha Chau Island after a smuggling speedboat slammed into her police interceptor, causing it to capsize.
41. 2025 何偉豪 (died at 37): A Hong Kong Fire Services senior firefighter who lost his life as one of the first responders in the 2025 Wang Fuk Court Fire. He was buried on 19 December 2025.
42. 2025 黃子滔 (died at 31): A Hong Kong Police senior inspector who lost his life week after losing consciousness during diving test for elite tactical squad. He was buried on 16 January 2026.

=== Breakdown of burials by disciplines or departments ===
Disciplinary Services

- Police Force: 16
- Fire Services Department: 10
- Government Flying Services: 2
- Immigration Department: 1
- Customs and Excise Department: 1

Other

- Marine Department: 1
- Water Supplies Department: 1
- Medical (doctors, nurses, other medical staff): 6
- Regco: 1

== See also ==
- List of cemeteries in Hong Kong
