= Kwun Tong Kung Lok Government Secondary School =

- 觀塘功樂官立中學
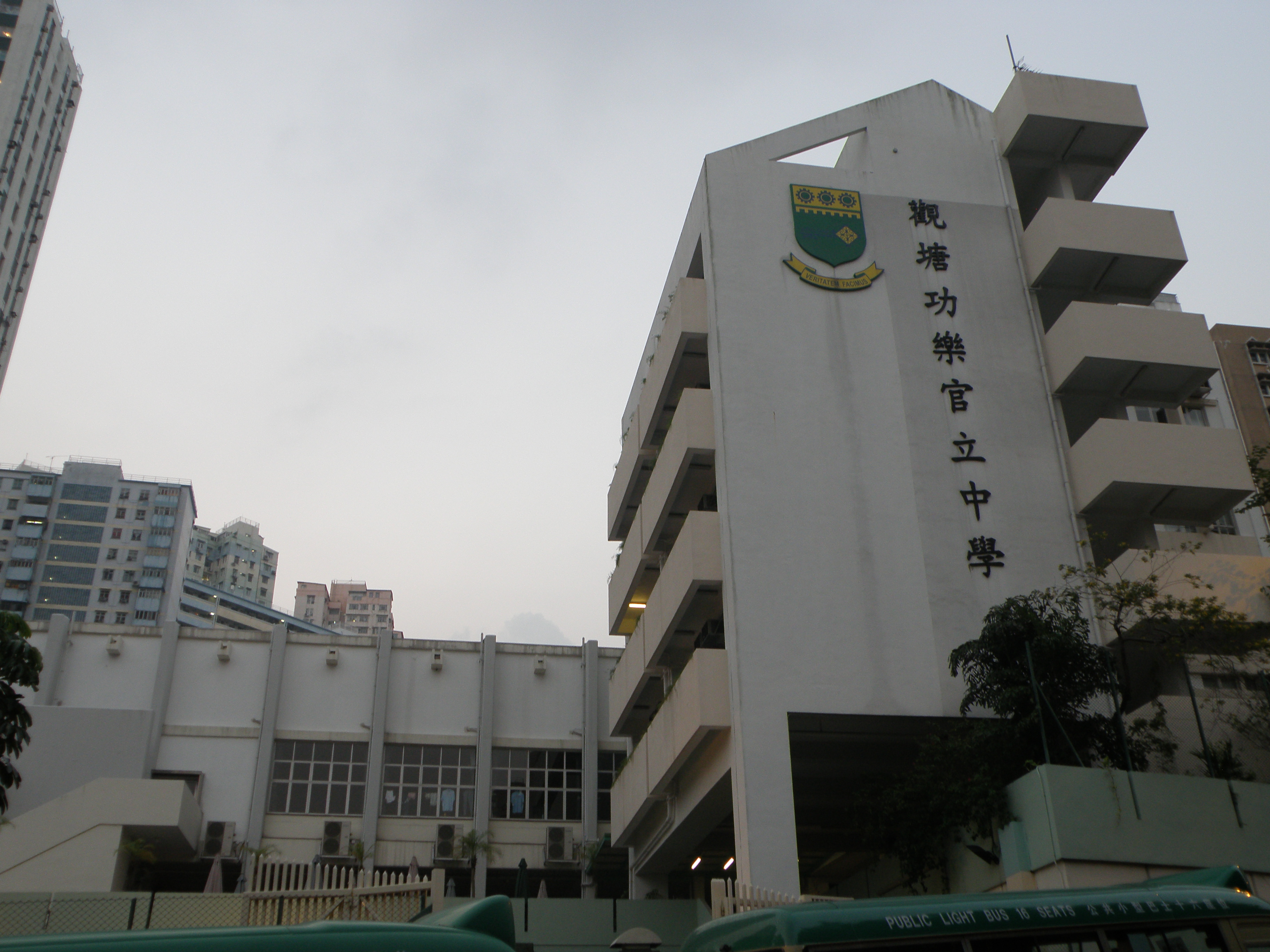

Location
- No. 90 Kung Lok Road; Kwun Tong, Kowloon; Hong Kong
- Coordinates: 22°19′06″N 114°13′20″E

Information
- Type: Government school
- Motto: VERITATEM FACIMUS
- Established: 1970; 56 years ago
- Founder: Education Bureau
- School district: Kwun Tong
- Chairman: Ms. HO Mo Ki, Mandy
- Principal: Ms. YIM Suk Ching, Suzanne
- Teaching staff: 57
- Gender: Boys
- Website: www.ktklgss.edu.hk

Kwun Tong Kung Lok Government Secondary School
- Traditional Chinese: 觀塘功樂官立中學
- Simplified Chinese: 观塘功乐官立中学
Transcriptions
Standard Mandarin
- Hanyu Pinyin: Guàntáng Gōng Lè Guān Lì Zhōngxué
Yue: Cantonese
- Jyutping: gun1 tong4 gung1 lok6 gun1 laap6 zung1 hok6

Kwun Tong Kung Lok Government Secondary School (Chinese: 觀塘功樂官立中學; often abbreviated as KTKLGSS) is a secondary boys' school founded in 1970. It is located at 90 Kung Lok Road, Kwun Tong, Kowloon, Hong Kong, and occupies an area of 86,080 square feet (7,997 m^{2}).

== History ==
In 1970, the Education Department founded Kwun Tong Government Secondary Technical School. Because of the changes in Hong Kong's education policy, the school name was changed from Traditional Technical schools to the same as Traditional Grammar schools, Kwun Tong Kung Lok Government Secondary School (Kung Lok refers to Kung Lok Road).

In 1990, the school began setting up the student union.

In 1993, Kwun Tong Government Secondary Technical School Alumni Association was set up.

In September 1999, the alumni association’s name changed to Kwun Tong Kung Lok Government Secondary School Alumni Association.

The school's basketball team has had an outstanding performance, up from D1 level to D3 level in just four short years.

The school implements The Hong Kong Award for Young People.

In 2000, the alumni association designed the poster for the new wing and donated a banyan to commemorate the 30th anniversary.

In mid-April 2010, the school made headlines across Hong Kong newspapers due to bullying problems and alleged inaction by teachers.

== Purpose ==
Kwun Tong Kung Lok Government Secondary School aims to provide holistic education to students, instructing them towards a balanced development. The school also provides maturity learning facilities, assists the students in comprehensive education, help them create a positive outlook on life, and encourage them to think globally while serving the community.

== Alma Mater ==
Many thoughts our minds employ, every day throughout our lives,

Hopes of health and ease and joy, 'tis for these we often strive,

These two truths at school we learn, the truth of what is just and fine,

Next to know ourselves in turn, and seek improvement all the time.

== Subjects Offered ==
S.1 – S.3:

Chinese, English, Mathematics*, Integrated Science* (S1-S2), Geography*, Chinese History, Computer Literacy*, Music*, Physical Education*, Visual Arts*, Putonghua, Life and Society*, Liberal Studies* (S3), Business & Economics Foundation (S3), Design & Technology

S.4 – S.6:

Chinese, English, Mathematics, Liberal Studies, Combined Science (Chemistry, Biology)(S5-S6), Physics, Chemistry, Biology, Economics, Geography, Chinese History, Information & Communication Technology, Design & Applied Technology, 'Business, Accounting and Financial Studies', Visual Arts, Tourism & Hospitality, Film & Video Studies, Music, Physical Education, Applied Learning (Mode 1), English extended learning activities.

== Notable alumni ==
- Tsui Po-ko, a Hong Kong police office who was implicated in a number of crimes.
- Ian Hung Kin Wah, a Hong Kong singer.

== See also ==
- Education in Hong Kong
- List of secondary schools in Hong Kong
