= Wah Sum Estate =

Public housing estate in Fanling, Hong Kong

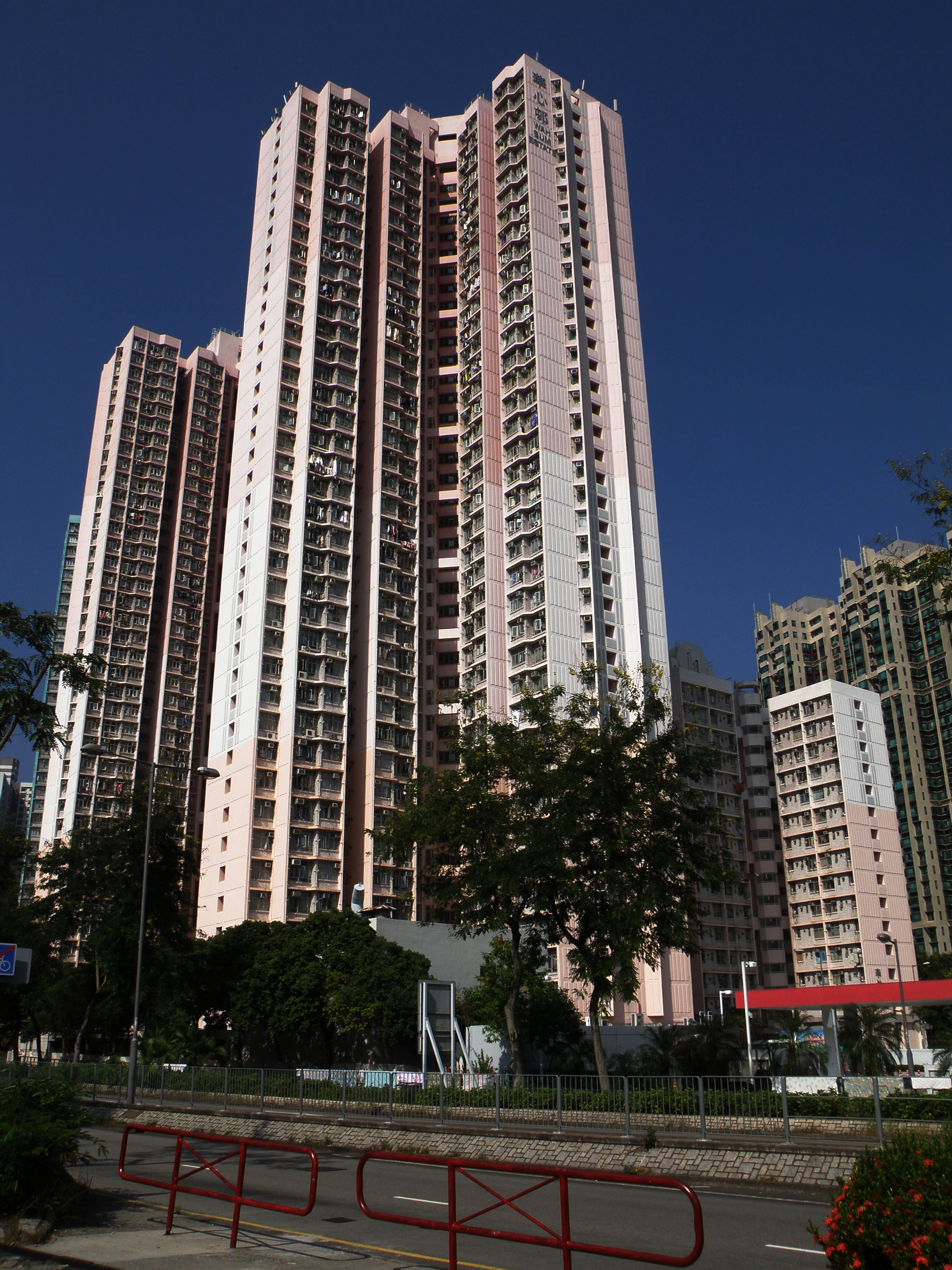
- Wah Sum Estate
- Interactive map of Wah Sum Estate

General information
- Location: 18 Yat Ming Road, Wo Hop Shek; Fanling; New Territories, Hong Kong
- Coordinates: 22.48595°N 114.14286°E
- Status: Completed
- Category: Public rental housing
- Population: 4,588 (2016)
- No. of blocks: 2
- No. of units: 1,481

Construction
- Constructed: 1995; 31 years ago
- Authority: Hong Kong Housing Authority

Wah Sum Estate (Chinese: 華心邨) is a public housing estate in Wo Hop Shek, Fanling, New Territories, Hong Kong, near Flora Plaza and Wo Hing Sports Centre. It consists of two residential buildings built in 1995.

King Shing Court (景盛苑) is a Home Ownership Scheme court in Wo Hop Shek, near Flora Plaza and Wah Sum Estate. It consists of four residential buildings built in 1995.

== Houses ==
=== Wah Sum Estate ===
Name	Chinese name	Building type	Completed
Wah Koon House	華冠樓	Harmony 1	1995
Wah Min House	華勉樓	Harmony 1 with Harmony Annex 1	1995

=== King Shing Court ===
Name	Chinese name	Building type	Completed
Foon King House	歡景閣	Harmony 1	1995
Chun King House	俊景閣	Harmony 1	1995
Yan King House	欣景閣	Harmony 1	1995
Yin King House	賢景閣	Harmony 1	1995

== Demographics ==
According to the 2016 by-census, Wah Sum Estate had a population of 4,588 while King Shing Court had a population of 6,804. Altogether the population amounts to 11,392.

== Politics ==
Wah Sum Estate and King Shing Court are located in Wah Do constituency of the North District Council. It is currently represented by Cheung Chun-wai, who was elected in the 2019 elections.

== See also ==
- Public housing estates in Fanling
