= Wo Hop Shek Branch =

Former branch railway line in Hong Kong

Wo Hop Shek Station

The Wo Hop Shek Branch was a railway line, built in the town of Wo Hop Shek and opened on 15 October 1949, to service the Wo Hop Shek Cemetery, Hong Kong's largest cemetery. The line was 950 metres (0.59 mi) long and had special trains that held coffins. The trains also had passenger cars for people to pay respects to their ancestors buried at the cemetery.

By 1958, crowd control measures were implemented into the station.

The route of the Wo Hop Shek Branch Line

The line was closed in April 1983 after the electrification of the British section of the KCR because of lowered demand.
