= Wah Do (constituency) =

- Elected constituency for the North District Council
- Boundary of Wah Do in North District
- District: North
- Legislative Council constituency: New Territories North
- Population: 18,412 (2019)
- Electorate: 12,135 (2019)

Current constituency
- Created: 2003
- Number of members: One
- Member: Cheung Chun-wai (NDB)

Wah Do (Chinese: 華都) is one of the 18 constituencies in the North District of Hong Kong which was first created in 2003.

The constituency loosely covers King Shing Court, Flora Plaza and Wah Sum Estate in Fanling with an estimated population of 18,412.

== Councillors represented ==
Election	Member	Party
2003	Poon Chun-yuen	Democratic
2011	Yiu Ming	DAB
2019	Cheung Chun-wai	North District Blueprint

== Election results ==
=== 2010s ===
North District Council Election, 2019: Wah Do
Party	Candidate	Votes	%	±%
NDB	Colin Cheung Chun-wai	5,288	58.68	
DAB	Yiu Ming	3,724	41.32	
Majority		1,564	17.36	
Turnout		9,046	74.58	
NDB gain from DAB		Swing		

North District Council Election, 2015: Wah Do
Party	Candidate	Votes	%	±%
DAB	Yiu Ming	Uncontested		
DAB hold		Swing		

North District Council Election, 2011: Wah Do
Party	Candidate	Votes	%	±%
DAB	Yiu Ming	3,062	59.2	
Democratic	Wilson Li Wing-shing	1,956	37.8	
People Power	Li Kai-hang	158	3.1	
Majority		1,106	21.4	
Turnout		5,176	49.5	
DAB gain from Democratic		Swing		

=== 2000s ===
North District Council Election, 2007: Wah Do
Party	Candidate	Votes	%	±%
Democratic	Poon Chung-yuen	2,547	59.4	
DAB	Yiu Ming	1,739	40.6	
Majority		808	18.8	
Democratic hold		Swing		

North District Council Election, 2003: Wah Do
Party	Candidate	Votes	%	±%
Democratic	Poon Chung-yuen	3,059	82.9	
Independent	Lai Sum	629	17.1	
Majority		2,430	65.8	
Democratic hold		Swing		
