= Tin Shui Wai Hospital =

- Hospital Authority

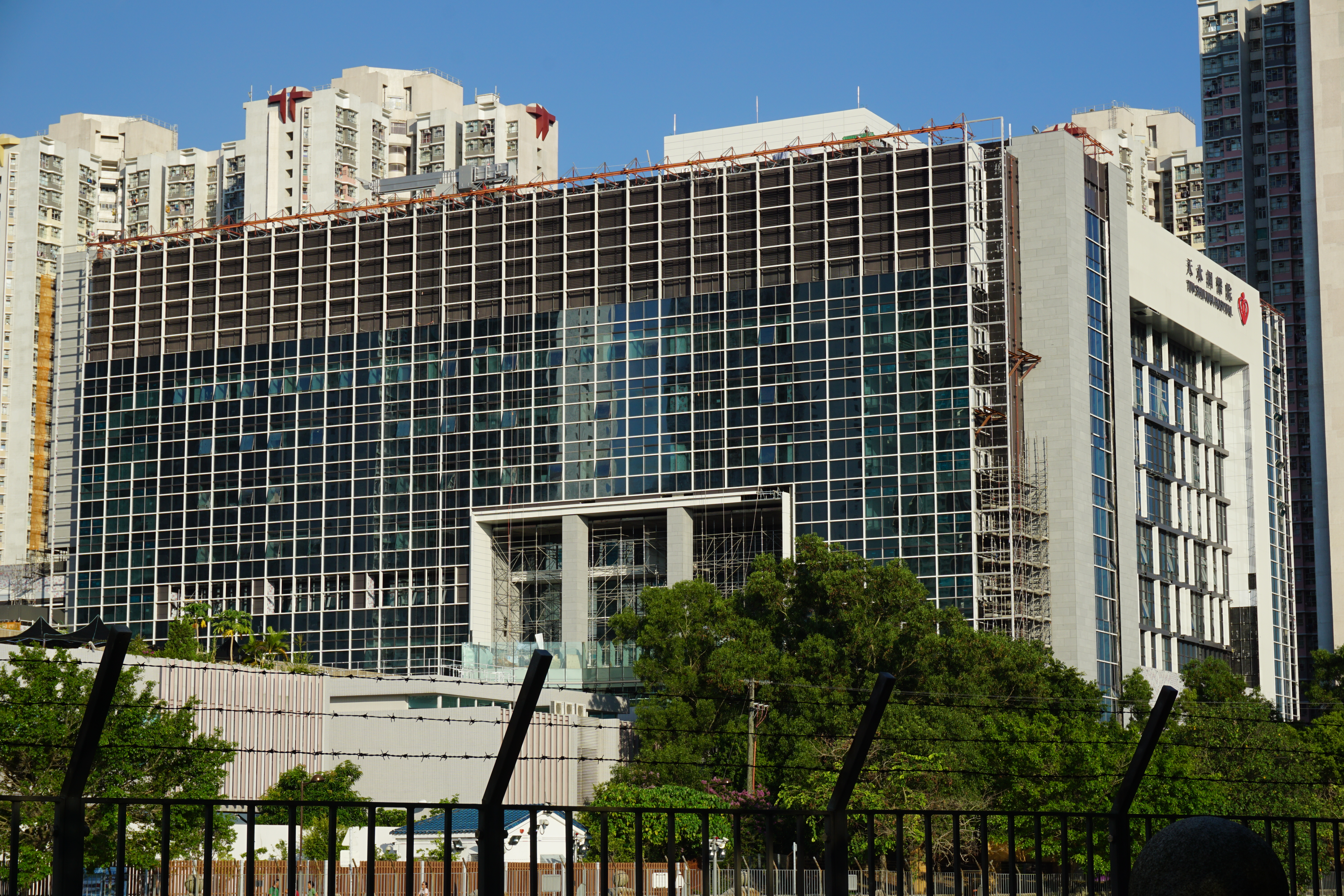
- View of the hospital in July 2016

- Location within Hong Kong

Geography
- Location: 11 Tin Tan Street, Tin Shui Wai, New Territories, Hong Kong
- Coordinates: 22°27′31″N 113°59′44″E

Organisation
- Care system: Hospital Authority
- Type: District
- Network: New Territories West Cluster

Services
- Emergency department: Yes, Accident and Emergency
- Beds: 300

Helipads
- Helipad: No

History
- Founded: 9 January 2017; 9 years ago

Links
- Website: www3.ha.org.hk/tswh/en/Default.asp
- Lists: Hospitals in Hong Kong

Tin Shui Wai Hospital
- Traditional Chinese: 天水圍醫院
Transcriptions
Yue: Cantonese
- Jyutping: tin1 seoi2 wai4 ji1 jyun2

Tin Shui Wai Hospital (Chinese: 天水圍醫院; Cantonese Yale: Tīnséuiwàih Yīyún; TSWH) is a 300-bed rural general hospital in Tin Shui Wai, Hong Kong. It is part of the New Territories West Cluster serving the population of Yuen Long and Tuen Mun districts, particularly those in the Tin Shui Wai New Town. It opened in 2017.

== History ==
As the population of Tin Shui Wai continued to grow, the need for a hospital in the area became apparent. Hospital Authority had initially rejected the proposal of constructing a hospital in the area due to limited resources. This led to demonstrations on 25 November 2007, 14 February 2008, and 27 April 2008. In response to the request, Donald Tsang, the Chief Executive of Hong Kong, announced a plan in his policy address to build a hospital in Tin Shui Wai and expected it to be completed by 2015.

Design and construction was carried out by a joint venture between Leighton Holdings and Able Engineering. Construction commenced in February 2013 and was completed in September 2016. It cost HK$3.91 billion.

Initial services, including the specialist out-patient clinic, renal dialysis, allied health, diagnostic radiology, pharmacy and community nursing, began operation on 9 January 2017.

The accident and emergency department began operating from 8:00 am to 4:00 pm from 15 March 2017. On 21 March 2018 the A&E services were extended to 12 hours per day (from 8:00 am to 8:00 pm).

The hospital plans to begin providing 24-hour accident and emergency services, as well as inpatient emergency services, from November 2018. It plans to offer 32 inpatient emergency beds upon commencement.

== Services ==
The hospital provides the following services.

- Accident and emergency (24 hours)
- Allied health
- Clinical pathology laboratories
- Community nursing services
- Diagnostic radiology
- Pharmacy
- Radiology
- Renal dialysis
- Specialist out-patient clinic
  - Family medicine
  - Orthopaedics and traumatology

== Transport ==
The hospital is an approximately 350-metre walk from Chung Fu stop of the Light Rail. It is also accessible by bus and minibus.
