= Medal for Bravery (Gold) =

The Medal for Bravery (Gold) 金英勇勳章
- Image of the medal
- Awarded for: acts of gallantry of the greatest possible heroism or of the most conspicuous courage in circumstances of extreme danger
- Presented by: Hong Kong
- Post-nominals: MBG
- Established: 1998
- First award: 1998

Precedence
- Next (higher): Gold Bauhinia Star
- Next (lower): Silver Bauhinia Star

Medal for Bravery (Gold) (simplified Chinese: 英勇勋章; traditional Chinese: 金英勇勳章; pinyin: Yīngyǒng Xūnzhāng, MBG) is the first Medal for Bravery rank of the Hong Kong honours system. It is awarded for acts of gallantry of the greatest possible heroism or of the most conspicuous courage in circumstances of extreme danger. It was created in 1997 to replace the British honours system after the transfer of sovereignty to People's Republic of China and the establishment of Hong Kong Special Administrative Region (HKSAR).

== List of recipients ==
=== 1998 ===
- Mr. LEE Ying-kwong, MBG (posthumous)
- Mr. Thomas Frederick Crosier LARMOUR, MBG (posthumous)

=== 1999 ===
- Mr. KWOK Kam-ming, MBG
- Mr. TAM Chung-keung, Joemy, MBG

=== 2000 ===
- Mr. LEUNG Kam-kwong, Donald, MBG (posthumous)
- Mr. LOO Chun-ho, MBG (posthumous)

=== 2001 ===
- Mr. CHIU Shun-on, MBG (posthumous)
- Mr. LAI Yiu-chung, MBG (posthumous)

=== 2002 ===
- Mr. Zafar Iqbal KHAN, MBG (posthumous)

=== 2003 ===
- Dr. TSE Yuen-man, MBG (posthumous)

=== 2004 ===
- Mr. CHEUNG Chun-wai, MBG (posthumous)

=== 2005 ===
- Mr. WONG Sai-kit, MBG

=== 2006 ===
- Mr. CHU Chun-kwok, MBG
- Mr. SIN Ka-keung, Wilson, MBG
- Mr. TSANG Kwok-hang, MBG (posthumous)

=== 2007 ===
- Mr. WONG Ka-hei, MBG (posthumous)
- Mr. CHIN Kwok-ming, MBG

=== 2008 ===
- Mr. CHAN Siu-lung, MBG (posthumous)
- Mr. SIU Wing-fong, MBG (posthumous)

=== 2010 ===
- Mr. WONG Fuk-wing, MBG (posthumous)
- Mr. YEUNG Chun-kit, MBG (posthumous)

=== 2011 ===
- Mr. LEUNG Kam-wing, Ken, MBG (posthumous)
- Mr. FU Cheuk-yan, MBG (posthumous)
- Mr. TSE Ting-chunn, Masa, MBG (posthumous)

=== 2015 ===
- Mr. LEUNG Kwok-kei, MBG (posthumous)

=== 2016 ===
- Mr. CHEUNG Thomas Y. F., MBG (posthumous)
- Mr. HUI Chi-kit, Samuel, MBG (posthumous)

=== 2017 ===
- Mr. YAU Siu-ming, MBG (posthumous)

=== 2020 ===
- Ms. NG Wing-man, Iris, MBG (posthumous)
- Mr. WONG Cheuk-bond, MBG (posthumous)
- Mr. CHENG Chak-yin, MBG
- Mr. LAI Chi-hang, Ben, MBG (posthumous)

=== 2021 ===
- Ms. LAM Yuen-yee, MBG (posthumous)

=== 2026 ===
- Mr. Ho Wai-Ho, MBG (posthumous)
