= Wo Hop Shek =

Area of Fanling, Hong Kong

- Chinese: 和合石
Transcriptions
Standard Mandarin
- Hanyu Pinyin: Héhéshí
Hakka
- Romanization: Fo2 hap6 sak6
Yue: Cantonese
- Yale Romanization: Wòh hahp sehk
- Jyutping: Wo4 hap6 sek6
- IPA: [wɔ˩.hɐp̚˨.sɛk̚˨]

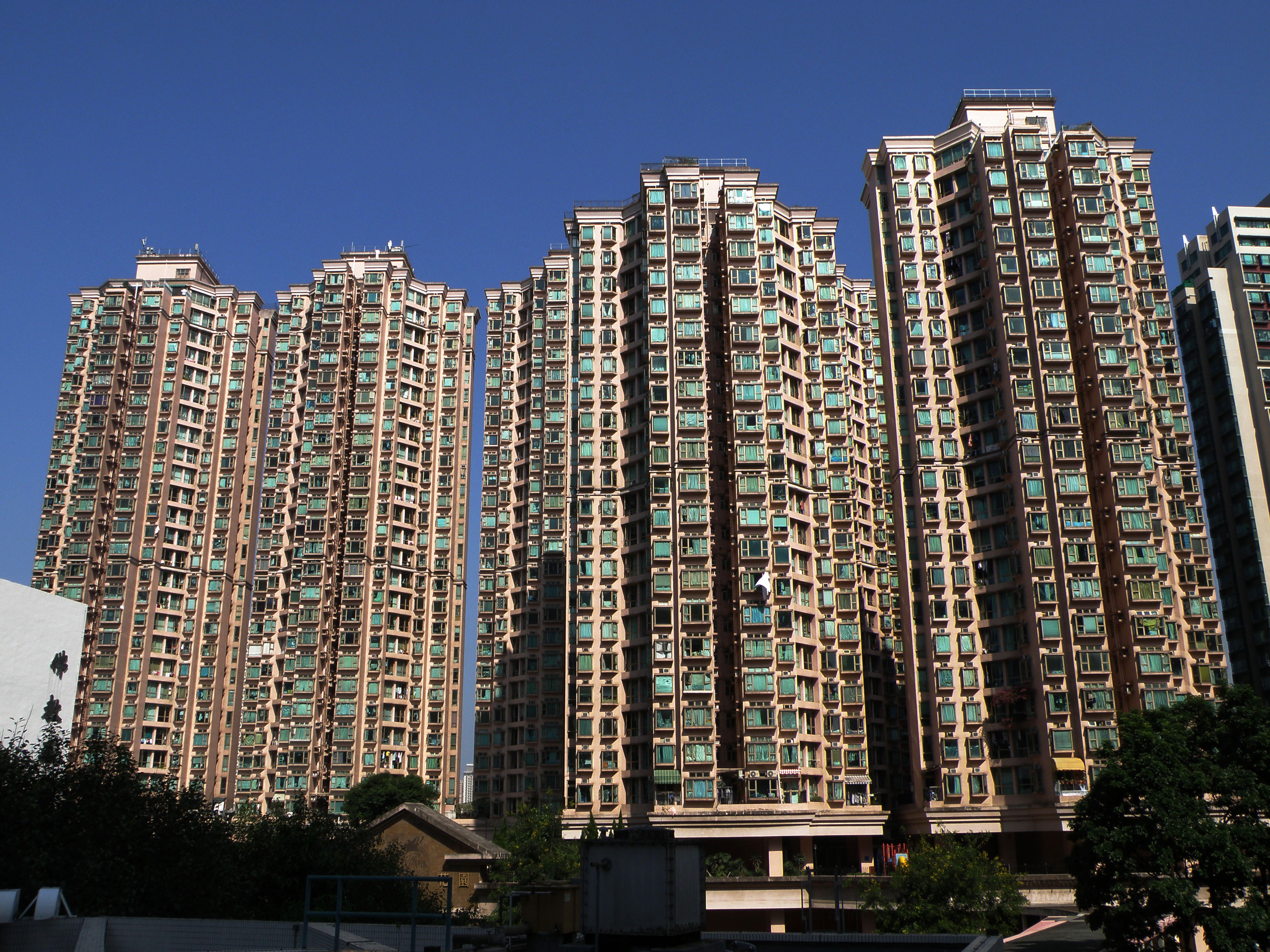
Avon Park, a private housing estate in Wo Hop Shek

Wo Hop Shek (Chinese: 和合石) is an area in the south of Fanling, Hong Kong. It consists of villages and recently developed housing estates. The area is famous for its large public cemetery, Wo Hop Shek Public Cemetery, on the nearby hillside. Every year, during the Ching Ming Festival and Chung Yeung Festival, many people come to visit their ancestors.

== Railway ==
Preceding station	KCR	Following station
Terminus	Wo Hop Shek Branch (1950-1983)	Fanling Terminus

In 1950–1951, the Wo Hop Shek Branch (made of a long siding) of the Kowloon–Canton Railway was built to transport bodies of civilians killed in World War II, and later to cater to the visitors in the Ching Ming Festival and Chung Yeung Festival. The whole single track branch was built upon an embankment. It branched off south of Fanling station, at the start of the curve. The station at Wo Hop Shek was the most modern of all stations in Hong Kong at the time it was built, and instead of being a brick built structure as other stations were, it was built of cement and steel. Special trains were built to carry the bodies. The branch was abandoned after the railway was electrified in 1983. No traces can be found now of the line, but the site of the station survives as a roundabout. The start of the branch is now marked by a red gate visible on the Fanling side of the Jockey Club Road bridge, which used to be a level crossing.

== Gallant Garden ==
In 1996, Gallant Garden (or Ho Yuen, in Cantonese), in Wo Hop Shek Public Cemetery, was established for the civil servants who die of injuries during their duty. In 2000, permanent earth burial was extended to both civil servants and non-civil servants who died of exceptional bravery on duty. There is also a big Buddhist-Taoist monastery built near the cemetery. There are many shops in the villages which make stone graves.

== Housing estates ==
These are mostly public housing estates built after 1983, as reflected on the fact that part of the original trackbed of the railway branch is occupied by two of the estates.

- Avon Park
- Cheong Shing Court
- Dawning Views
- King Shing Court
- Wah Ming Estate
- Wah Sum Estate
- Yan Shing Court
- Yung Shing Court

== Villages ==
- Ho Ka Yuen
- Wo Hing Tsuen
- Wo Hop Shek New Village (和合石新村)
- Wo Hop Shek Village (和合石村)

=== Wo Hop Shek Village ===
Wo Hop Shek is a recognized village under the New Territories Small House Policy.

At the time of the 1911 census, the population of Wo Hop Shek Village was 48. The number of males was 21.
