= New Territories West Cluster =

Health care in Hong Kong

- 新界西醫院聯網
- Logo of the New Territories West Cluster
- Formation: 1 October 2002
- Region served: HK
- Services: Health care
- Cluster Chief Executive: Dr. Deacons Yeung Tai-kong
- Parent organisation: Hospital Authority
- Staff: 8,309
- Website: www.ha.org.hk/ntwc/

New Territories West Cluster (Chinese: 新界西醫院聯網; NTWC) is one of the six hospital clusters managed by Hospital Authority in Hong Kong. It consists of 5 public hospitals and 8 family medicine clinics (FMC) (formerly known as general outpatient clinics (GOPC) (Note: GOPCs have been officially renamed to FMCs in Oct 2025, see this press release)) to provide public healthcare services for the population of Tuen Mun and Yuen Long districts. In mid-2012, the population was 1,085,300. Its cluster chief executive as of June 2026 is Dr. Deacons Yeung Tai-kong.

== Services ==
New Territories West Cluster operates the following four hospitals of various capabilities to provide a range of acute, convalescent, rehabilitation, and infirmary inpatient and ambulatory care services to the public in the areas of Tuen Mun and Yuen Long districts. In mid-2012, the population of the areas was 1,085,300.

- Tin Shui Wai Hospital (TSWH)
- Castle Peak Hospital (CPH)
- Pok Oi Hospital (POH)
- Siu Lam Hospital (SLH)
- Tuen Mun Hospital (TMH)

As of March 2013, the cluster has 3,967 in-patient beds.
