= Wo Hop Shek Public Cemetery =

Cemetery in Fanling, New Territories, Hong Kong

Coordinates: 22.4750°N 114.1379°E

- Traditional Chinese: 和合石墳場
- Simplified Chinese: 和合石坟场
Transcriptions
Standard Mandarin
- Hanyu Pinyin: Héhéshí Fénchǎng
Yue: Cantonese
- Jyutping: wo4 hap6 sek6 fan4 coeng4

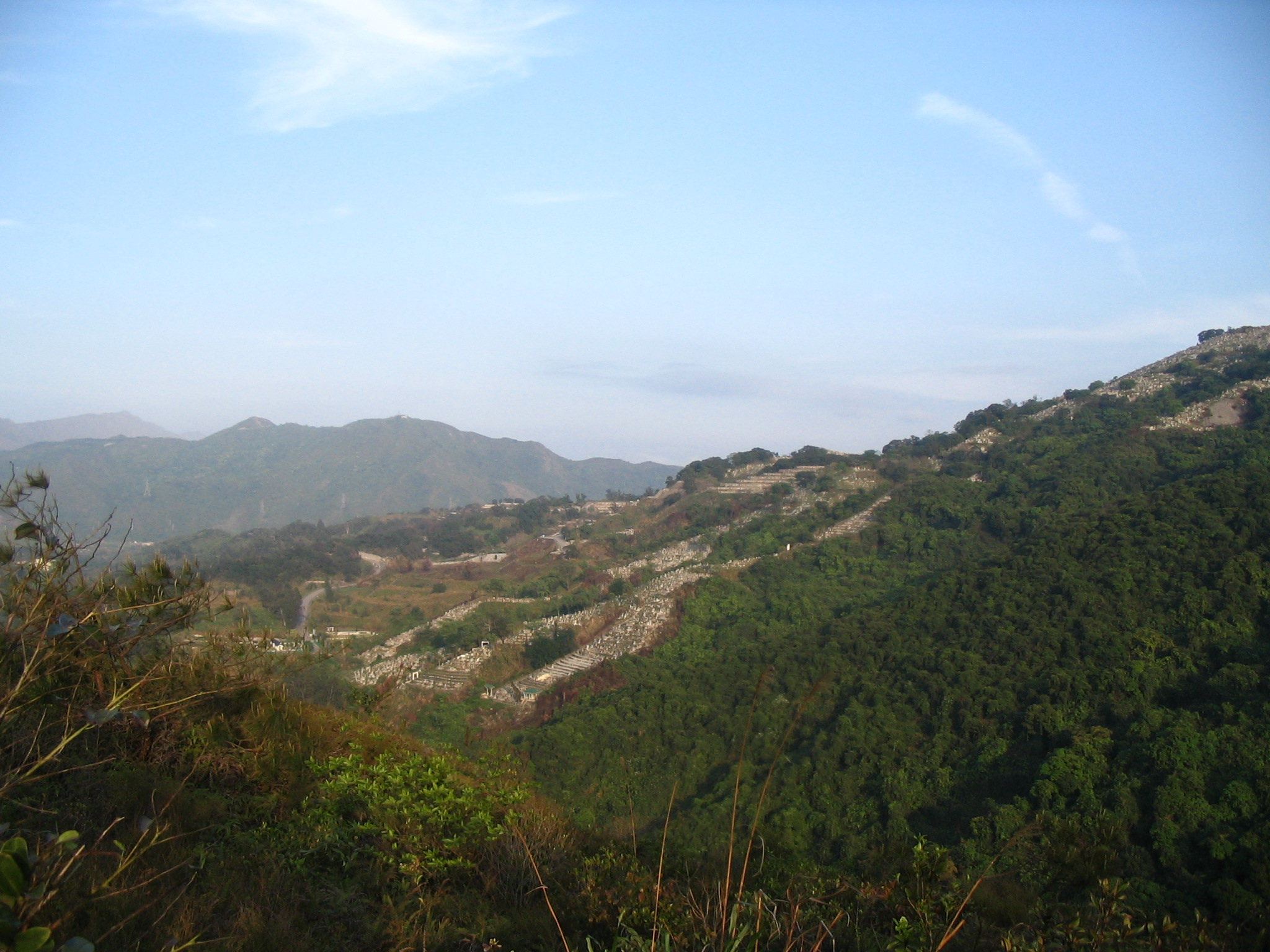
Wo Hop Shek Public Cemetery in April 2008

Wo Hop Shek Public Cemetery (Chinese: 和合石墳場), in Wo Hop Shek near Fanling in Hong Kong, is the largest public cemetery in Hong Kong. The cemetery opened in 1950 in the New Territories as cemeteries began to reach capacity on Hong Kong Island. Wo Hop Shek covers 222.4 hectares with space for full and cremated remains. The cemetery is located in a hilly area ranging from 100 to over 300 metres.

Within the cemetery is Gallant Garden, a burial site for public servants killed on duty, opened in 1996 and is located to the northwest corner of the cemetery.

Wo Hop Shek Public Cemetery is a public cemetery managed by the Food and Environmental Hygiene Department.

Lam Tsuen Country Park is located the southwest of Wo Hop Shek.

== Interments ==
- Ip Man, martial artist

== See also ==
- List of cemeteries in Hong Kong
