= Tuen Mun Hospital =

- Hospital Authority
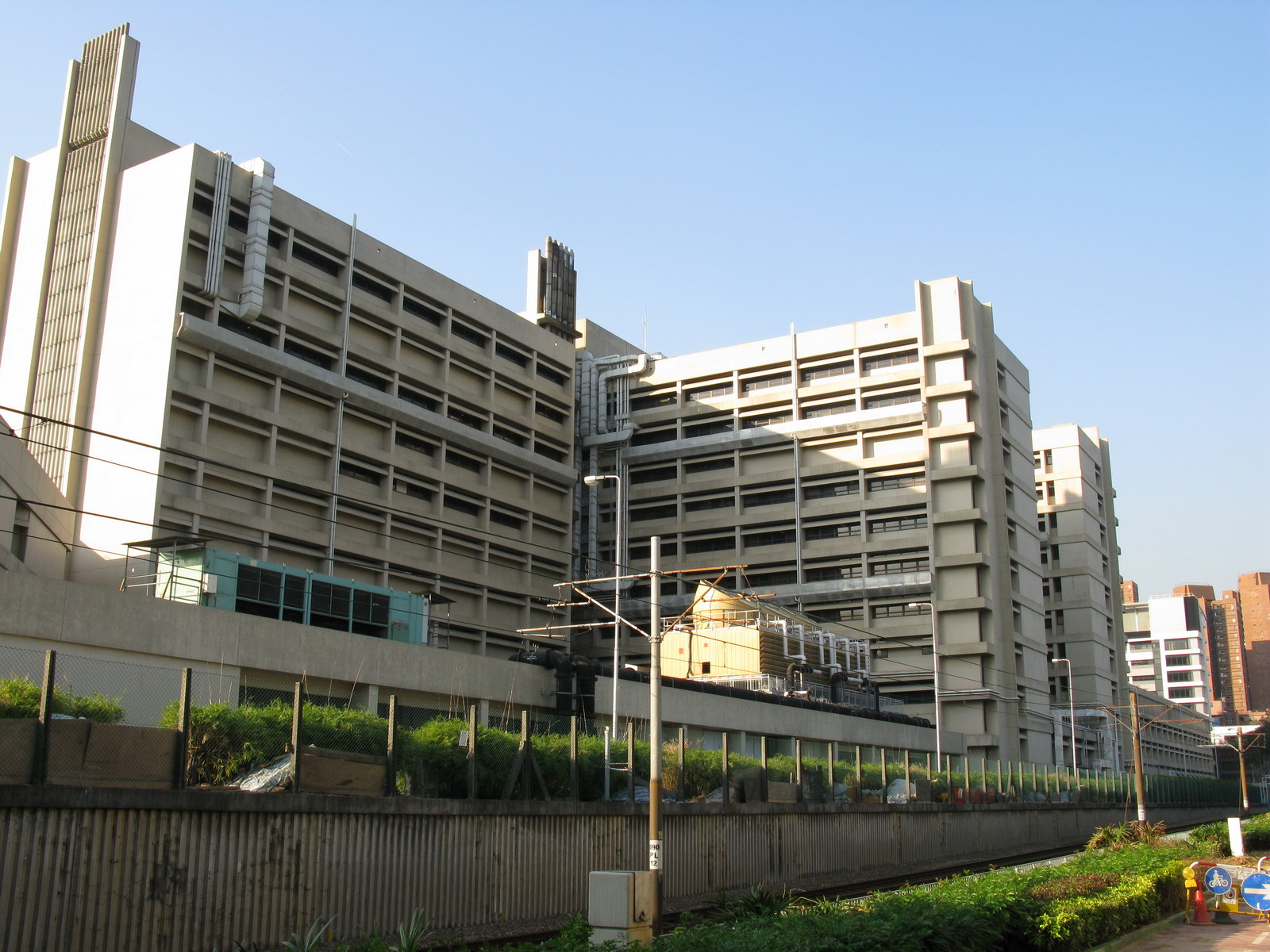
- Tuen Mun Hospital Main Block

- Location within Hong Kong

Geography
- Location: 23 Tsing Chung Koon Road, Tuen Mun, New Territories, Hong Kong, Tuen Mun, Hong Kong
- Coordinates: 22.40768°N 113.97600°E

Organisation
- Care system: Public
- Type: District General
- Affiliated university: Tuen Mun Hospital School of General Nursing
- Network: New Territories West Cluster

Services
- Emergency department: Yes, accident and emergency and trauma centre
- Beds: 2,000

Helipads
- Helipad: Yes

History
- Founded: 8 March 1990; 36 years ago

Links
- Website: www3.ha.org.hk/tmh/en/
- Lists: Hospitals in Hong Kong

Tuen Mun Hospital
- Traditional Chinese: 屯門醫院
- Simplified Chinese: 屯门医院
- Cantonese Yale: Tyùhn mùhn yī yuhn
Transcriptions
Standard Mandarin
- Hanyu Pinyin: Tún Mén Yīyuàn
Yue: Cantonese
- Yale Romanization: Tyùhn mùhn yī yuhn
- Jyutping: Tyun4 mun4 ji1 jyun6*2

Tuen Mun Hospital (Chinese: 屯門醫院; TMH) is a district general hospital in Tuen Mun, New Territories, Hong Kong. It construction began in 1979, and it was inaugurated on 8 March 1990. It is governed by the Hospital Authority, and it is main public hospital in West and North of New Territories, It is main part of New Territories West Cluster.

== History ==
Tuen Mun Hospital was designed by the Architectural Services Department. It was constructed by Aoki Corporation, a Japanese civil engineering and construction services firm. The hospital was topped out in a ceremony hosted by Sir David Akers-Jones on 28 August 1986, at which time it was the largest hospital under construction in the world.

The hospital commenced services on 8 March 1990 and cost HK$1.2 billion. The accident and emergency department opened on 30 July that year.

== Management ==
=== Hospital Governing Committee ===
This is a list of the current and former chairmen of the committee:

- William Chan Fu-keung

=== Hospital Chief executive ===
Appointed by the Hospital Authority, the Hospital Chief executive is in charge of managing the hospital and reports to the Hospital Governing Committee.

Dr Simon Tang Yiu-hang (1 April 2018 – present)

=== Medical Superintendents ===
- Cheng Pak-wing
- Liu Shao-haei

== Services ==
As of 31 March 2017, the hospital had 1,935 beds and around 6,487 members of staff. For the year ended 31 March 2017, it treated 174,586 inpatients and day-patients, 776,713 specialist outpatients, and 851,943 general outpatients.

=== Specialties ===
- Accident and emergency department
- Anaesthesiology
- Clinical Oncology
- Clinical Pathology
- Dentistry
- Dermatology
- Radiology
- Mentally Handicapped
- Neurosurgery
- Nuclear Medicine
- Obstetrics & Gynaecology
- Ophthalmology
- Orthopaedics & Traumatology
- Paediatrics & Adolescent Medicine
- Ear, Nose & Throat
- Psychiatry
- Medicine & Geriatrics
- Surgery
- Renal

=== Others ===
- Trauma center
- Audiology
- Cancer Patient Resource Centre
- Clinical psychology
- Dietetics
- Emergency Radiation Treatment Centre
- Geriatric Community Assessment Service
- Geriatric Day Hospital
- Occupational Therapy
- Optometry
- Physiotherapy
- Podiatry
- Procedure Unit
- Prosthetic-orthotic Services
- Speech Therapy

== Facilities ==
The ground floor of the hospital is occupied by the casualty ward, and a day-care centre. The hospital has recently established a trauma unit and a neo-natal intensive care unit.

Tuen Mun Hospital also has a General Out-Patient Clinic or Polyclinic. The Yan Oi Polyclinic at 6 Tuen Lee Street is not to be mistaken for the fictional Yan Oi Hospital from the TVB series The Hippocratic Crush.

Previously the hospital had the only operational helipad in New Territories, and one of the two hospitals in Hong Kong (Pamela Youde Nethersole Eastern Hospital and Tuen Mun Hospital), however currently the helipad has been shut down and is being used as external storage following an expansion to the surgical units at the hospital.

It is one of the two major Radiation Emergency Treatment Centres in Hong Kong (Pamela Youde Nethersole Eastern Hospital and Tuen Mun Hospital), and the only one in New Territories.

== Transport ==
It is served by the Tuen Mun Hospital stop of the MTR Light Rail.
