= Tulmullah Nallah =

Stream in Jammu and Kashmir, India

Tulmulla Nallah Nagpaav
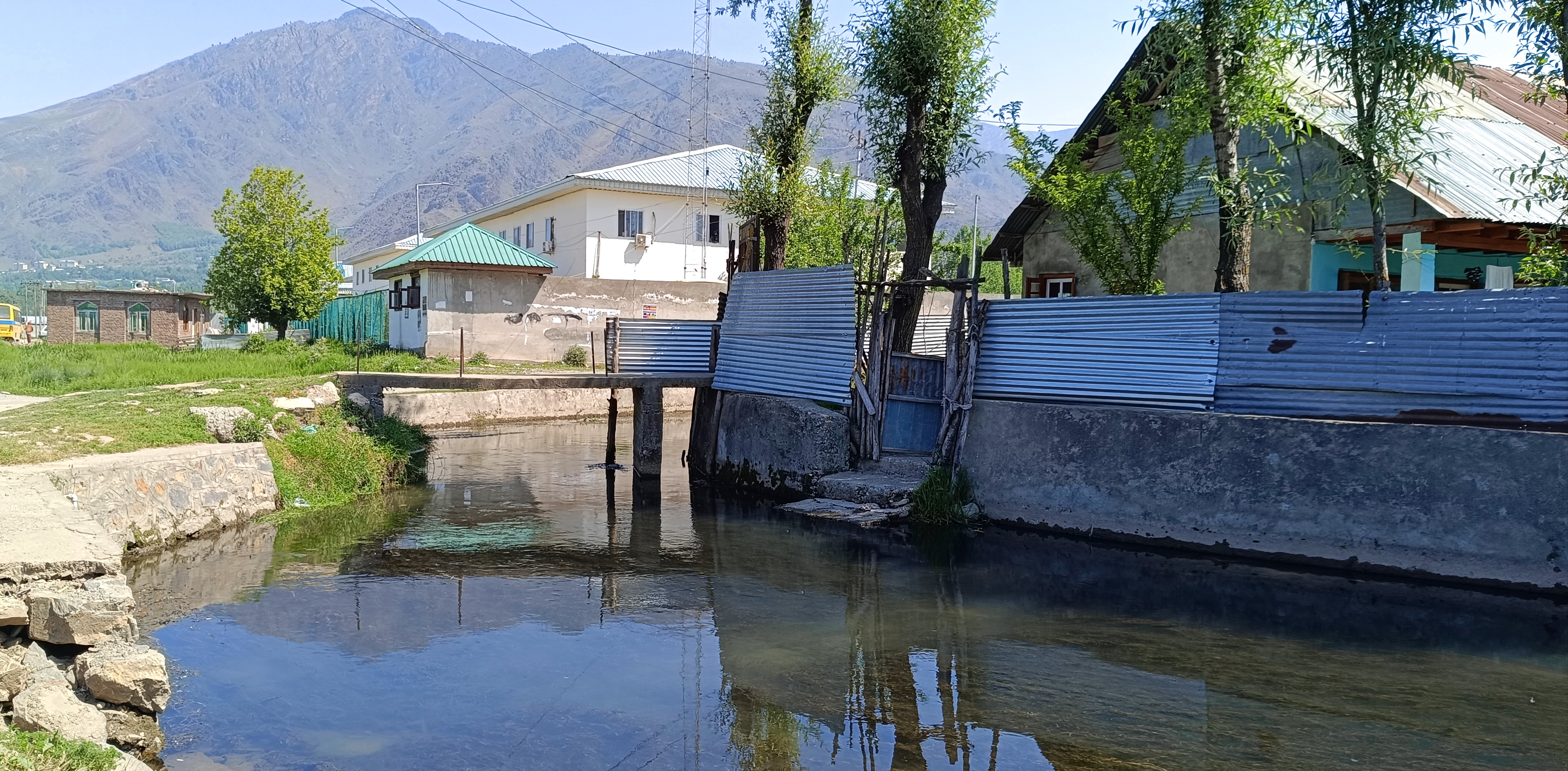
- Nagpaav or Tulmulla Nallah framed near Central University of Kashmir (2024)

- Location of Tulmulla Nallah in Jammu and Kashmir, India Tulmullah Nallah (India)

Location
- Country: India
- State: Jammu and Kashmir
- District: Ganderbal district

Physical characteristics
- Source
  - location: Springs Near Lar town
- Mouth
  - location: Sind River at Narayanbagh village near Shadipora
  - coordinates: 34°11′02″N 74°40′52″E

Tulmulla, locally known as Naagpav, is a stream or nullah flowing through the villages of Tulmullah tehsil in Ganderbal district of Indian-administered union territory of Jammu and Kashmir.

== Origin and route ==
Tulmulla Nallah originates from the springs near Lar town of Ganderbal district. This stream flows through the Central University of Kashmir, then reaches to Kheer Bhawani temple. It then flows through the village of Tulmulla, tracing the footsteps of Mata Kheer Bhawani, a revered Hindu goddess. The water from the holy shrine of Kheer Bhawani is brought by Tulmulla Nallah, adding to its spiritual significance.

== Confluence ==
Tulmullah Nallah eventually joins the Sind River at Narayanbagh village near Shadipora. The Sind River, in turn, merges with the Jhelum River. Notably, the Sind River brings water from the Panchtarini stream, originating from the holy Amarnath cave, and combines it with the water from the holy shrine of Kheer Bhawani brought by Tulmulla Nallah. This stream servers as an important sources of water for adjoining villages. This water is used for the cultivation of paddy.

== Significance ==
The confluence of Tulmullah Nallah with the Sind River at Shadipora holds cultural and religious importance. The merging of waters from various sacred sites, including the revered Kheer Bhawani shrine and the Amarnath cave, adds to the spiritual aura of the region. Pilgrims and devotees often visit these sites to pay homage and seek blessings.
