= Tai Po River =

River in New Territories, Hong Kong

Coordinates: 22.4432°N 114.1708°E

- Traditional Chinese: 大埔河
- Cantonese Yale: daaih bou hòh
- Jyutping: daai6 bou3 ho4
Transcriptions
Yue: Cantonese
- Yale Romanization: daaih bou hòh
- Jyutping: daai6 bou3 ho4

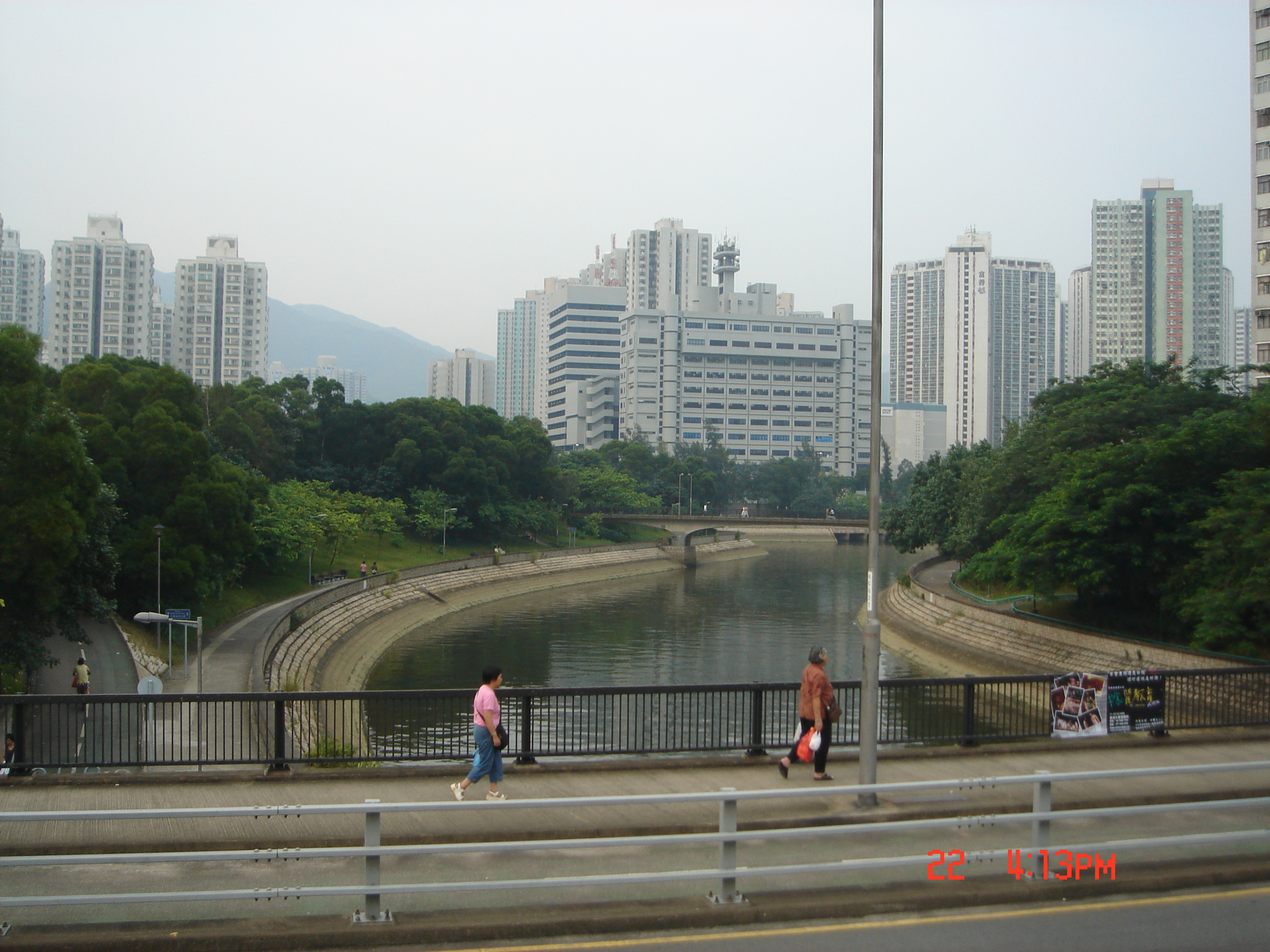
Tai Po River

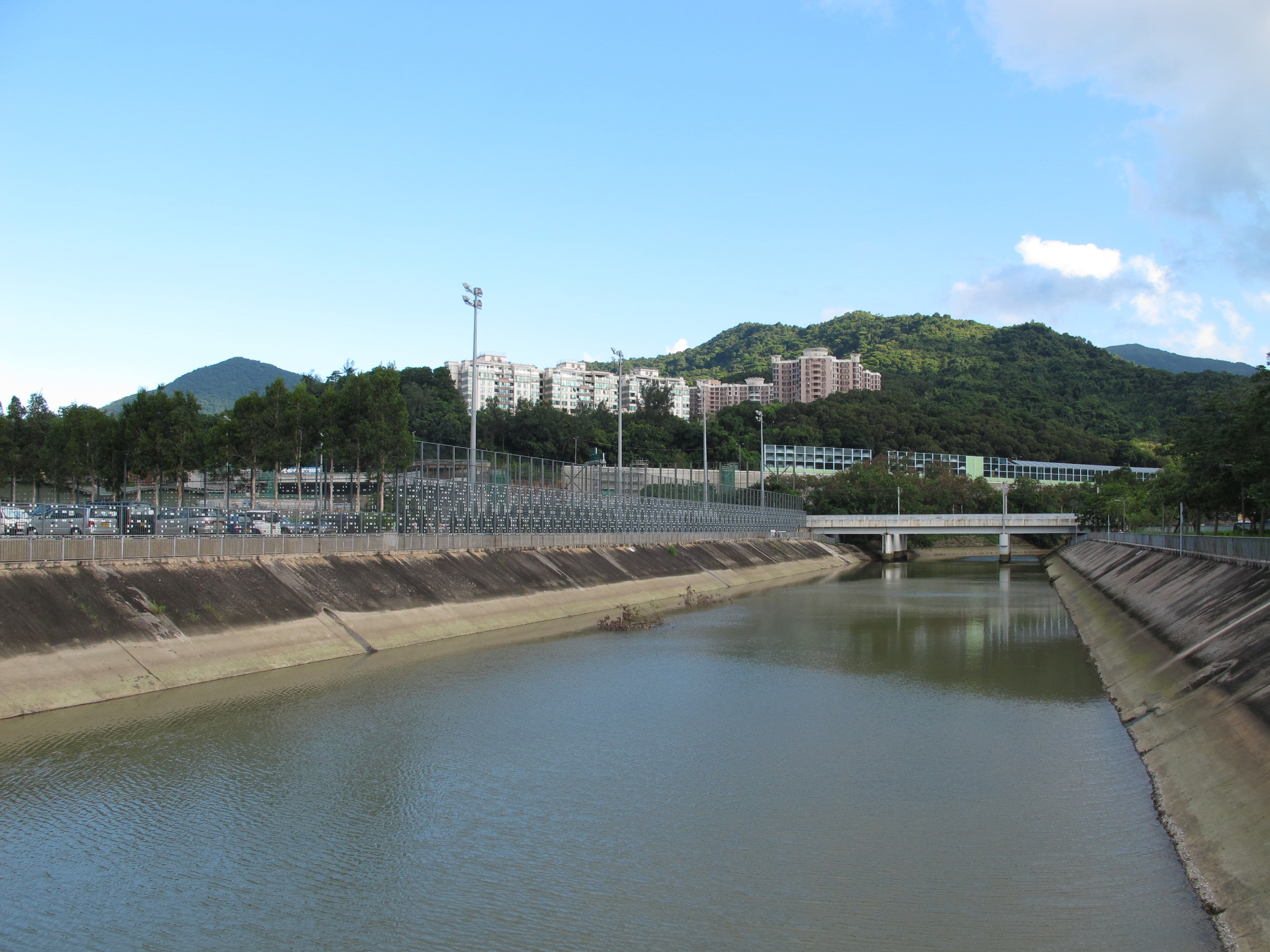
Tai Po River

The Tai Po River (Chinese: 大埔河; pinyin: Dapu He) is a river in Tai Po, New Territories, Hong Kong.

It has many tributaries, with most coming from the Ta Tit Yan, Grassy Hill, Lead Mine Pass and Yuen Tun Ha area. The tributaries gradually merge as the Tai Po River, which parallels Tolo Highway until Tai Po Market station, where it turns north to meet the Lam Tsuen River.

== History ==
Before the 1970s, the Tai Po River flowed straight into Tolo Harbour near Tai Po Market station. However, due to the pressing need for development land in the then new town of Tai Po, the land was reclaimed, and the Tai Po River lengthened northwards to flow into the Lam Tsuen River before it enters Tolo Harbour.

== See also ==
- List of rivers and nullahs in Hong Kong
