= List of rivers and nullahs in Hong Kong =

The rivers of Hong Kong, adjacent to the coast, are not part of the system of major rivers in southern China; though the water to the west of Hong Kong is influenced by the Pearl River. Covering only about 1,103 km^{2} of land and consisting largely of hilly terrain and more than 200 islands, Hong Kong naturally supports only short and relatively small rivers and streams.

Historically, these rivers once sustained intensive farming for the need of population before the age of developing new towns. Many of the larger waterways, including the Shing Mun River and Kam Tin River, have since been extensively channelised and now function primarily as drainage channels rather than natural rivers. Natural streams can be found mainly in country parks, such as Tai Po Kau Nature Reserve, Shing Mun Reservoir, Ng Tung Chai, Nam Chung and Tai Ho River, most of them in New Territories.

== Kowloon and New Kowloon ==
Name	Image
Fung Wong Kai Stream (鳳凰溪)	
Jordan Valley Nullah (佐敦谷渠)	
Kai Tak Nullah (啟德渠)	
Kwun Tong Nullah (觀塘渠)	
Tonkin Street Nullah (東京街渠)	
Tso Kung Tam (曹公潭)	

== Hong Kong Island ==
Name	Image
Staunton Creek Nullah (黃竹坑渠)	
Tai Hang Nullah (covered 1960s) (大坑明渠)	
Bowrington Canal (covered 1970s) (寶靈頓運河)	Trams crossing Bowrington Canal in the 1920s

== New Territories ==
=== Mainland ===
Name	Image
Fairview Park Nullah (錦繡花園明渠)	
Fo Tan Nullah (火炭渠)	
Ha Tsuen Nullah (廈村明渠)	
Ho Chung River (蠔涌河)	
Kam Tin River (錦田河)	
Kap Man Hang (夾萬坑)	
Kau To Hang (九肚坑)	
Kwan Tei River (軍地河)	
Lam Tsuen River (林村河)	
Lung Hang (龍坑)	
Ma Liu River (馬尿河)	
Ma Wat River (麻笏河)	
Nam Chung River (南涌河)	
Ng Tung River (梧桐河)	
Pak Sha O River (白沙澳河)	
Ping Yuen River (平原河)	
Sha Tau Kok River (沙頭角河)	
Sham Chun River (深圳河)	
Shan Pui River (山貝河)	
She Shan River (社山河)	
Shek Sheung River (石上河)	
Sheung Yue River (雙魚河)	
Shing Mun River (城門河)	
Siu Lek Yuen Nullah (小瀝源渠)	
Tai Lam Chung (大欖涌)	
Tai Po Kau Stream (大埔滘溪)	
Tai Po River (大埔河)	
Tai Shing Stream (大城石澗)	
Tai Shui Hang (大水坑)	
Tan Shan River (丹山河)	
Tin Shui Wai Nullah (天水圍渠)	
Tuen Mun River (屯門河)	
Tung Wan Hang (東灣坑)	
Wong Chuk Chung (黃竹涌)	
Yuen Long Nullah (元朗渠)	

=== Lantau Island ===
Name	Image
Silver River (銀河)	
Tai O Chung (大澳涌)	
Tai O Chung (大澳涌)	
Tung Chung River (東涌河)	
Wong Lung Hang (黃龍坑)	

== See also ==
- Geography of Hong Kong
- List of buildings, sites, and areas in Hong Kong
- List of rivers in China
- Subterranean rivers in Hong Kong
- Nullah
