= Badwa =

Badwa is one of the names given to male spiritual leaders among the Bhil tribes of the Indian state of Maharashtra.

The religious sphere of Bhils is represented by variety of spirits, ghosts, gods, goddess, and deities. The Deovera (place of pray) is a popular religious centre and commands full respect and recognition (Mann, 1982). The Deovra are erected in the names of lineage, hamlets or village as a whole. In general, a Bhil Deovera contains images of Devi, Mata, Bhomia, Dharam Raj, Robari Baba etc., such religious spots are specially taken care of by the popular religious man known as Bhopa (Nagda, 1992). The chief of a Deovera is called Pat Bhopa or Badwa. He is fully competent to invoke deity. A Bhopa is used to search the cause and cure of morbidity and sterility.

== Bibliography ==
- Mann, Rann Singh. 1982.
- Nagda, BL. 1992.
- S Samvatsar, S and VB Diwanji. "Plant sources for the treatment of jaundice in the tribals of Western Madhya Pradesh of India". Journal of Ethnopharmacology 73 (2000): 313–316. — "The village elders and tribal medicine man 'Badwa' were interviewed ..."
