= Wong Chuk Yeung =

Wong Chuk Yeung (黃竹洋) is the name of two villages in Hong Kong:

- Wong Chuk Yeung (Tai Po District), in Tai Po District
- Wong Chuk Yeung (Sha Tin District), in Fo Tan, Sha Tin District
