= Kai Tak Nullah =

Watercourse in Kowloon, Hong Kong

Coordinates: 22.3298°N 114.1977°E

- Traditional Chinese: 啟德明渠
- Simplified Chinese: 启德明渠
- Cantonese Yale: kái dāk mìhng kèuih
Transcriptions
Standard Mandarin
- Hanyu Pinyin: Qǐdé Míngqú
- Wade–Giles: Chʻi^{3}-tê^{2} Ming^{2}-chʻü^{2}
Yue: Cantonese
- Yale Romanization: kái dāk mìhng kèuih
- Jyutping: kai2 dak1 ming4 keoi4

Alternative Chinese name
- Traditional Chinese: 啟德河
- Simplified Chinese: 启德河
- Cantonese Yale: kái dāk hòh
Transcriptions
Standard Mandarin
- Hanyu Pinyin: Qǐdé Hé
- Wade–Giles: Chʻi^{3}-tê^{2} Ho^{2}
Yue: Cantonese
- Yale Romanization: kái dāk hòh
- Jyutping: kai2 dak1 ho4

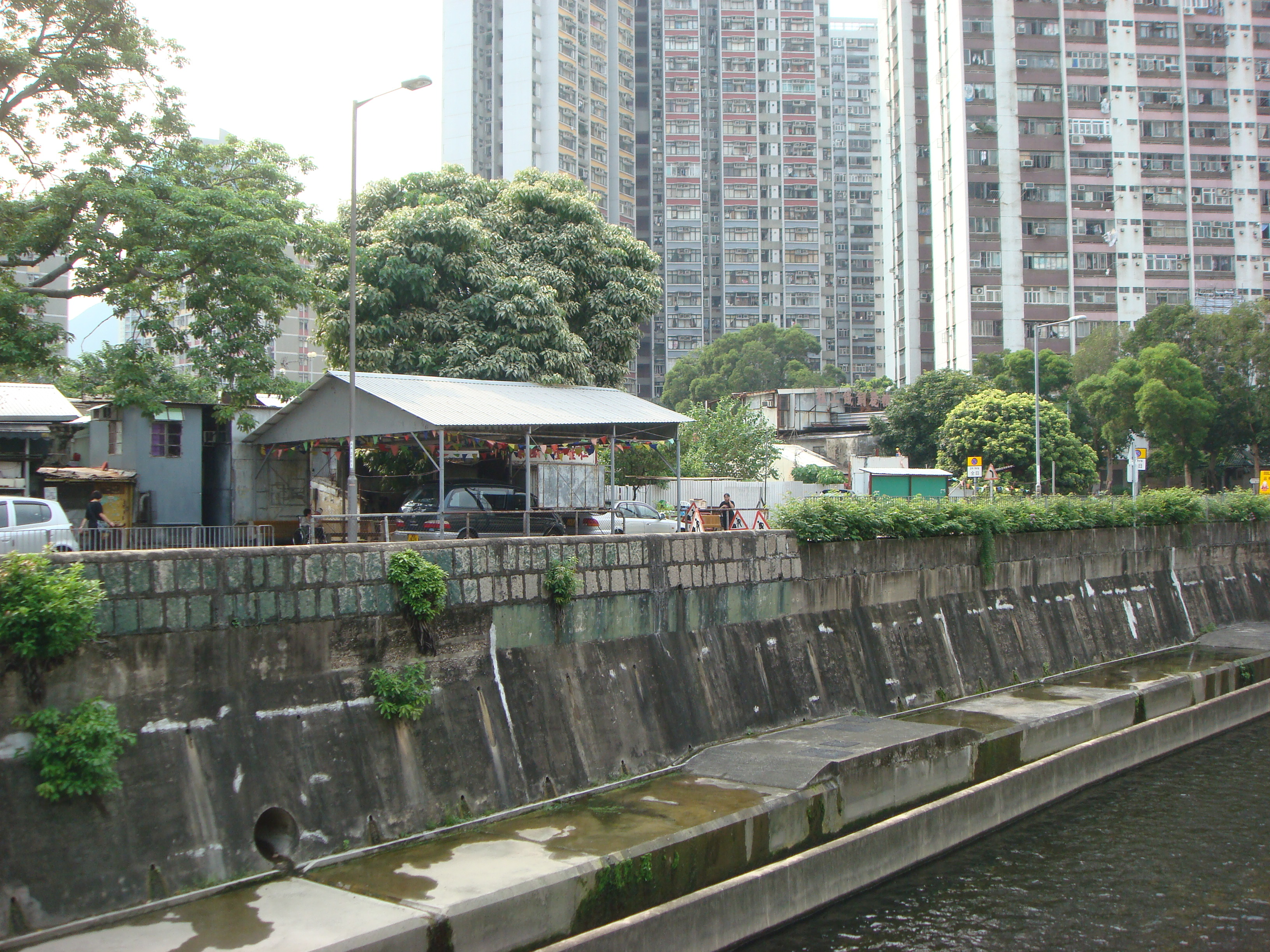
Kai Tak Nullah in front of Nga Tsin Wai Tsuen and Tung Tau Estate. San Po Kong is on the opposite bank.

The Kai Tak Nullah (Chinese: 啟德明渠), also known as the Kai Tak River (啟德河) and sometimes spelled Kaitak, is a nullah or watercourse that collects water from the rivers and streams flowing from the hills in northern New Kowloon. It empties into a narrow channel leading into the Kwun Tong Typhoon Shelter. Part of the nullah is covered by roads and other facilities.

The Kai Tak Nullah is about 2.4 km (1.5 mi) in length. It flows from Po Kong Village Road along Choi Hung Road, pass Tung Tau Estate and San Po Kong, into Kai Tak Development Area before discharging into the Victoria Harbour at the Kwun Tong Typhoon Shelter. It has an upstream and a midstream. The nullah is one of the major flood relief drainage channels in the East Kowloon area. The improvement work of Kai Tak Nullah has been overseen by the Civil Engineering and Development Department since March 2012, aiming to turn the nullah into an attractive green river corridor. It was anticipated to be fully completed before 2021.

== History ==
Originally, the location of Kai Tak Nullah was a bay. During Japanese occupation, Kai Tak Airport was expanded through land reclamation. The extension of Fung Wong Kai Stream was named Lung Tsun River (龍津河). Lung Tsun River's original estuary is at the north of To Kwa Wan Road. After the airport expansion work, however, reclamation for the runway blocked the estuary, and the river was redirected to follow today's route.

During New Territories' new town development in the 1970s, the river become a nullah for Tai Po Sewage Treatment Works, Sha Tin Sewage Treatment Works and illegal discharge pollutants. This resulted in pollutants and heavy pollutants being in the water, which resulted in the waterway giving off a putrid smell. After treatment work by the Drainage Services Department in 2000, Kai Tak Nullah has seen significant improvement. Herons are occasionally now seen along the nullah.

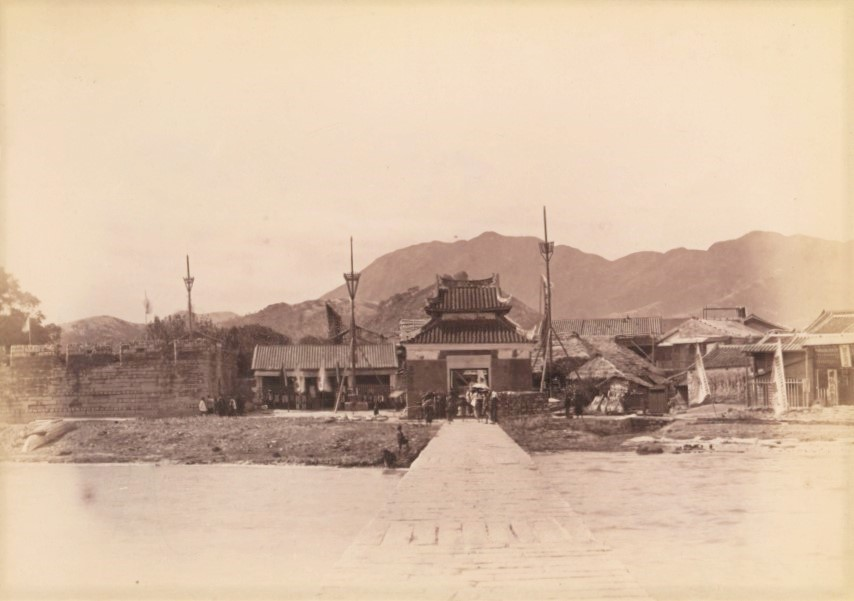
Kai Tak Nullah was a bay, close to Lung Tsun Stone Bridge (1915)

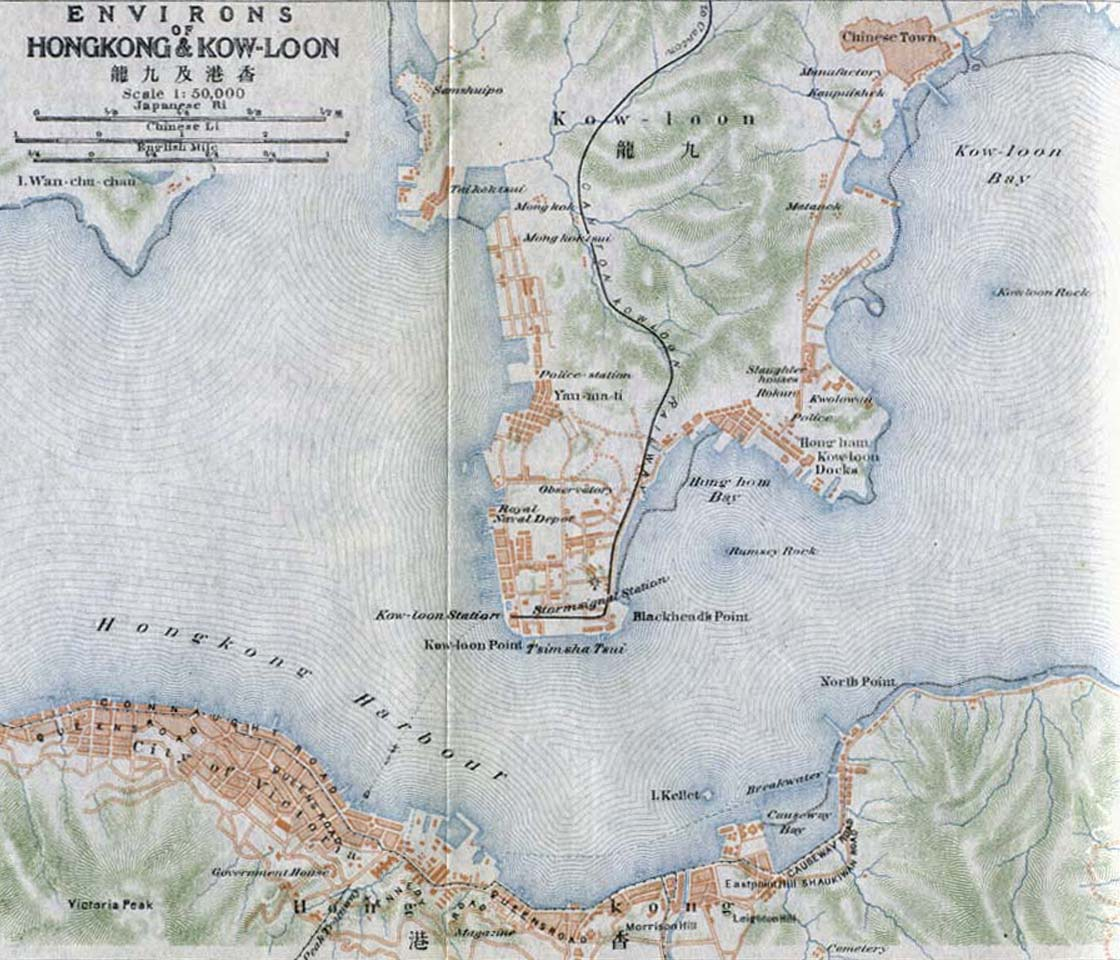
Map of Kowloon in 1915. The Kai Tak Nullah is next to Kowloon Walled City (or Chinese Town in this map) and Lung Tsun Stone Bridge.

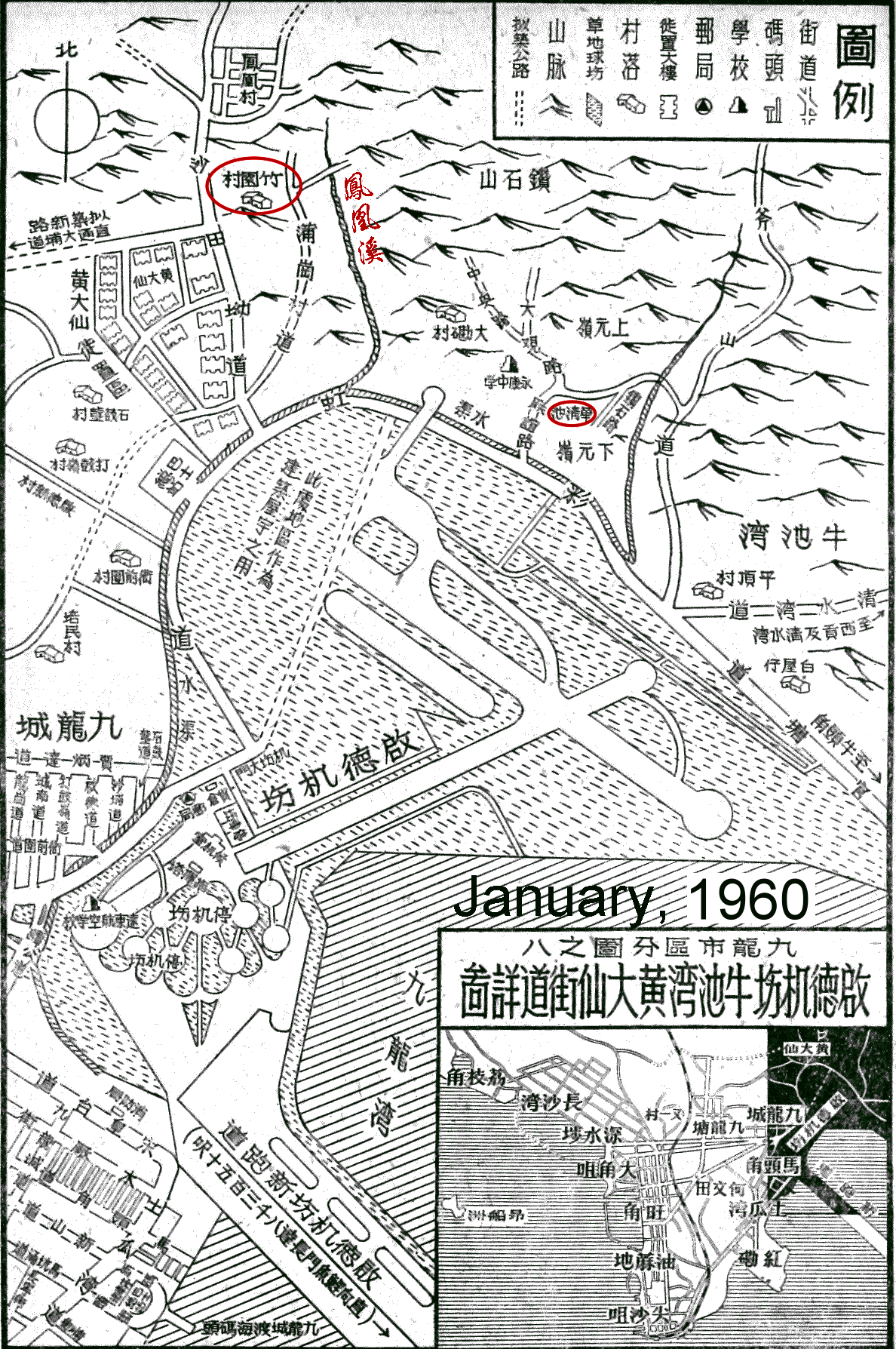
Kai Tak Nullah in 1960

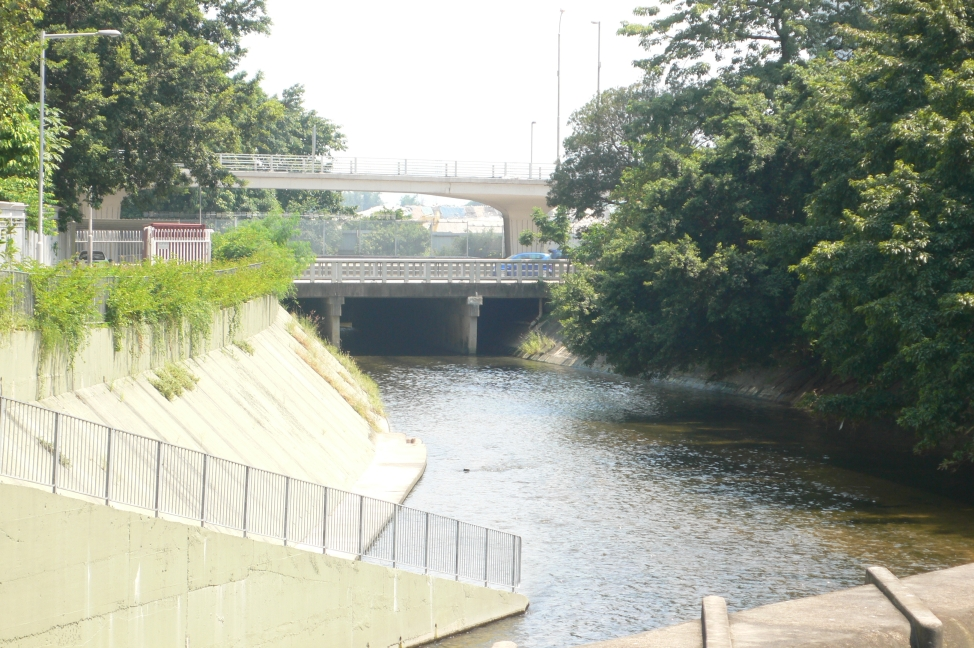
Water flow from Nullah to Kai Tak Airport in 2007

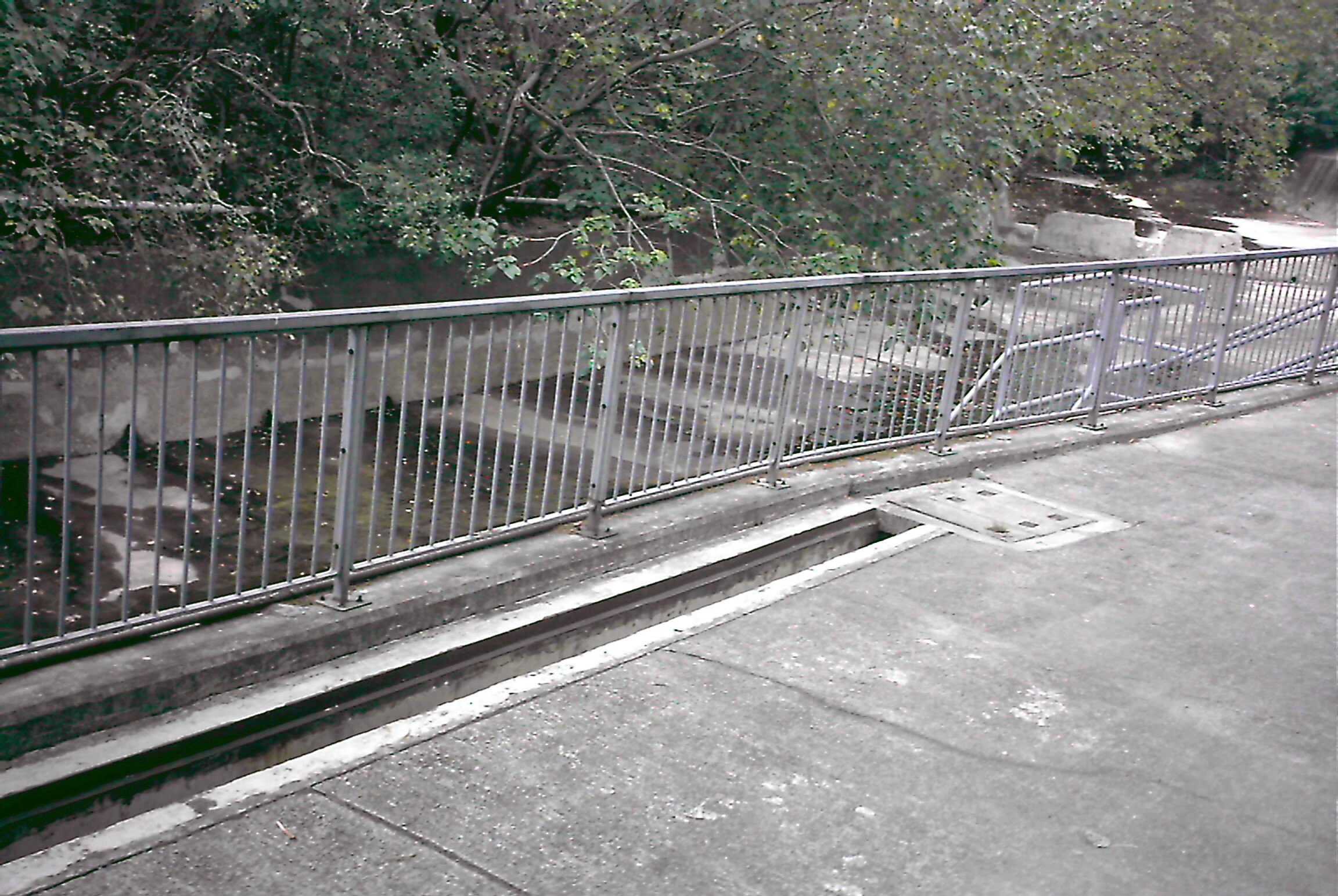
Meeting point of Fung Wong Kai Stream and Kai Tak Nullah (2008)

== Proposal of covering nullahs ==
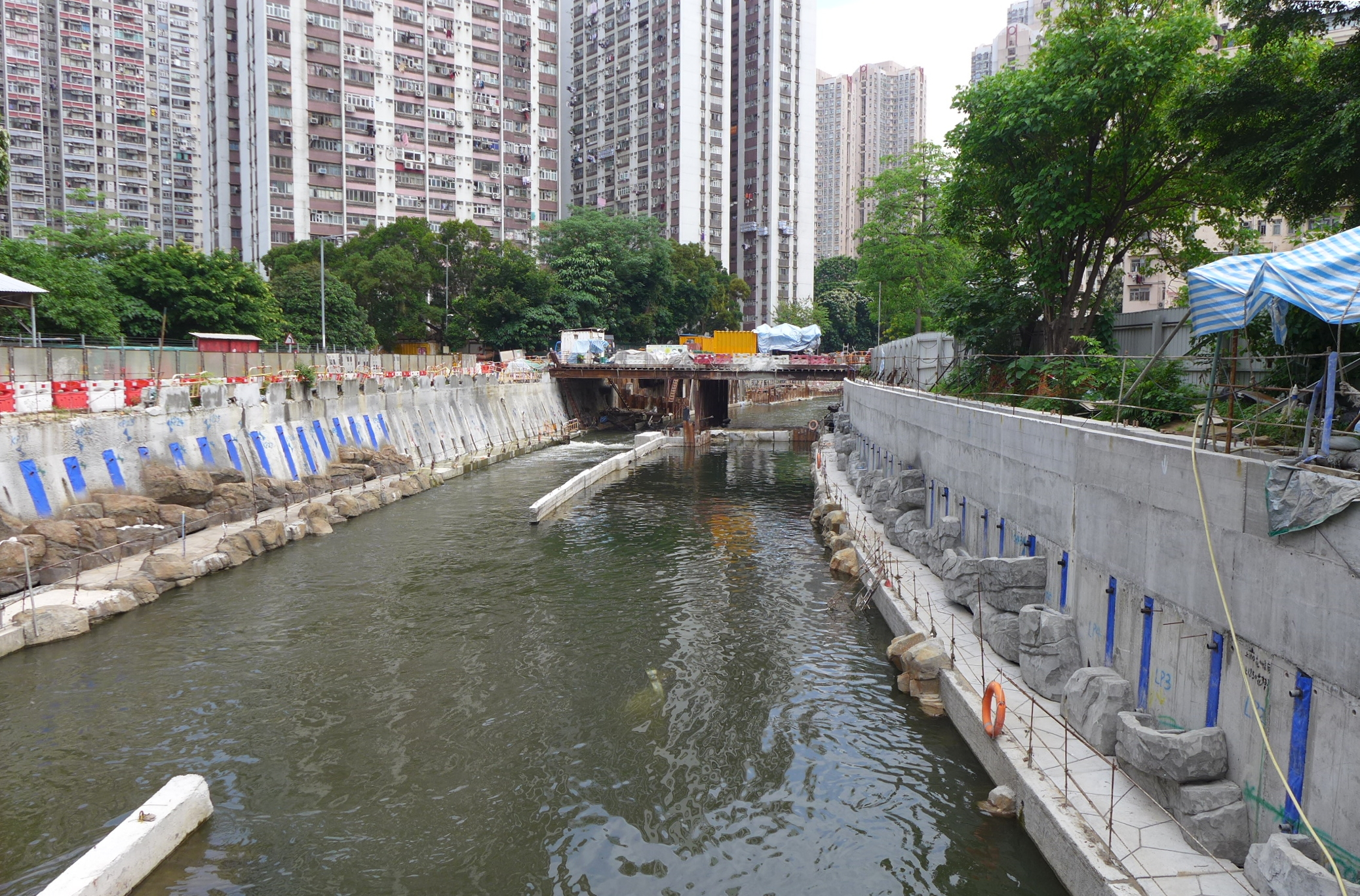
Improvement work in May 2016

In January 2005, the Drainage Services Department announced plans for nullah-covering works for 16 nullahs, at the cost of 1.2 billion Hong Kong dollars. These included a plan to cover up part of the Kai Tak Nullah along Choi Hung Road, starting in 2010 and finishing by 2014. The Traffic and Transport Committee of Wong Tai Sin District Council demanded a faster timetable, in order to launch the greening work and widen Choi Hung Road.

As the water quality improved, at the urging of the pro-Beijing political party Democratic Alliance for the Betterment and Progress, the Federation of Trade Unions, and environment concern group Conservancy Association, the Civil Engineering and Development Department launched a feasibility study on turning the nullah into Kai Tak River. They aim to turn it into a new river like the Cheonggyecheon in South Korea.

== See also ==
- List of rivers and nullahs in Hong Kong
- Subterranean rivers in Hong Kong
