= Ta Tit Yan =

Coordinates: 22.424041°N 114.1622°E

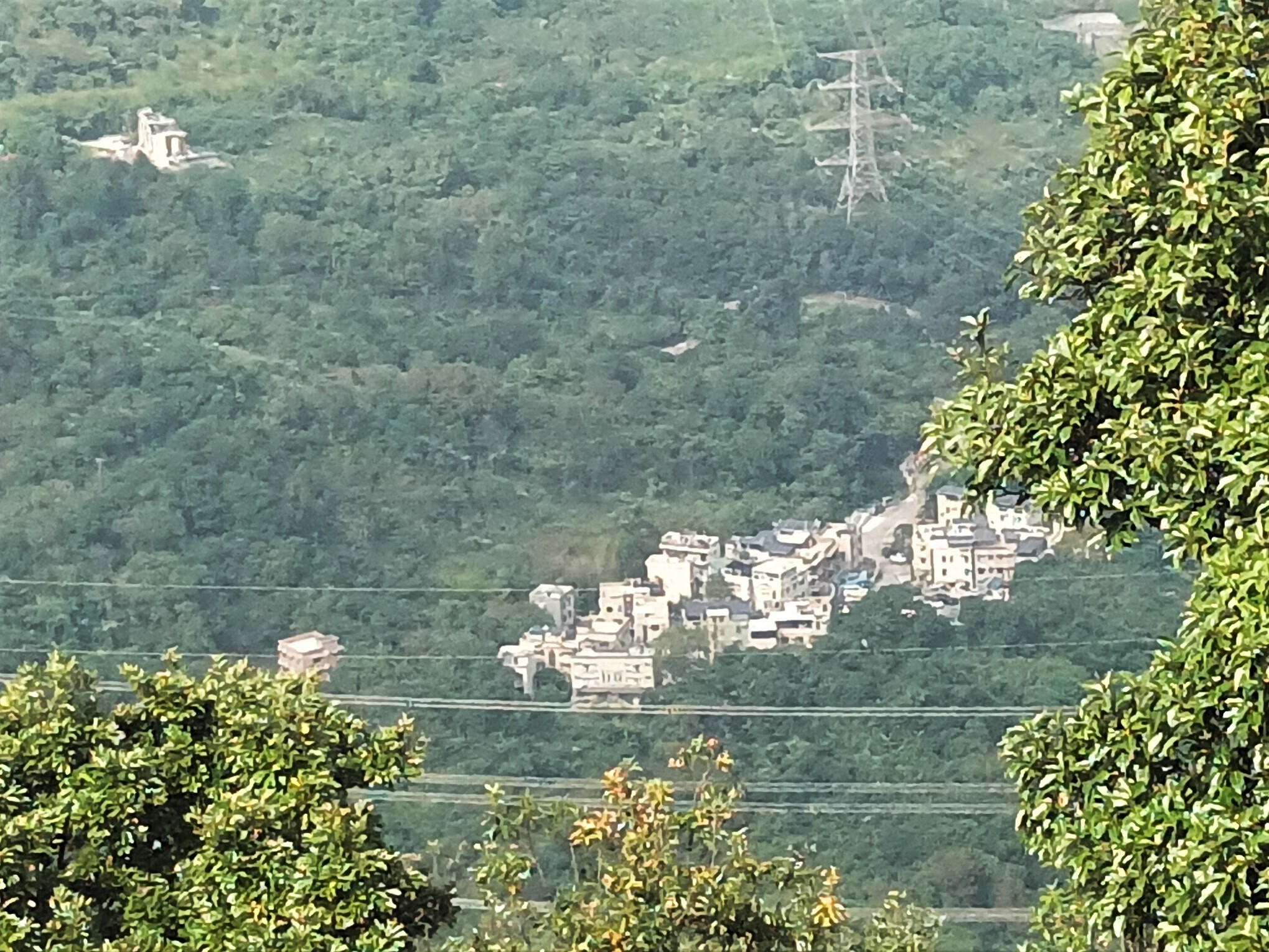
View of Ta Tit Yan from Grassy Hill.

Ta Tit Yan (Chinese: 打鐵屻) is a village in Tai Po District, Hong Kong.

== Administration ==
Ta Tit Yan is one of the villages represented within the Tai Po Rural Committee. For electoral purposes, Ta Tit Yan is part of the Tai Po Kau constituency, which is currently represented by Patrick Mo Ka-chun.

Ta Tit Yan is a recognized village under the New Territories Small House Policy.

== See also ==
- Tai Po River
