= Ma Wat River =

River in Hong Kong

Coordinates: 22.4891°N 114.1472°E

- Traditional Chinese: 麻笏河
- Cantonese Yale: màh fāt hòh
Transcriptions
Yue: Cantonese
- Yale Romanization: màh fāt hòh
- Jyutping: maa4 fat1 ho4

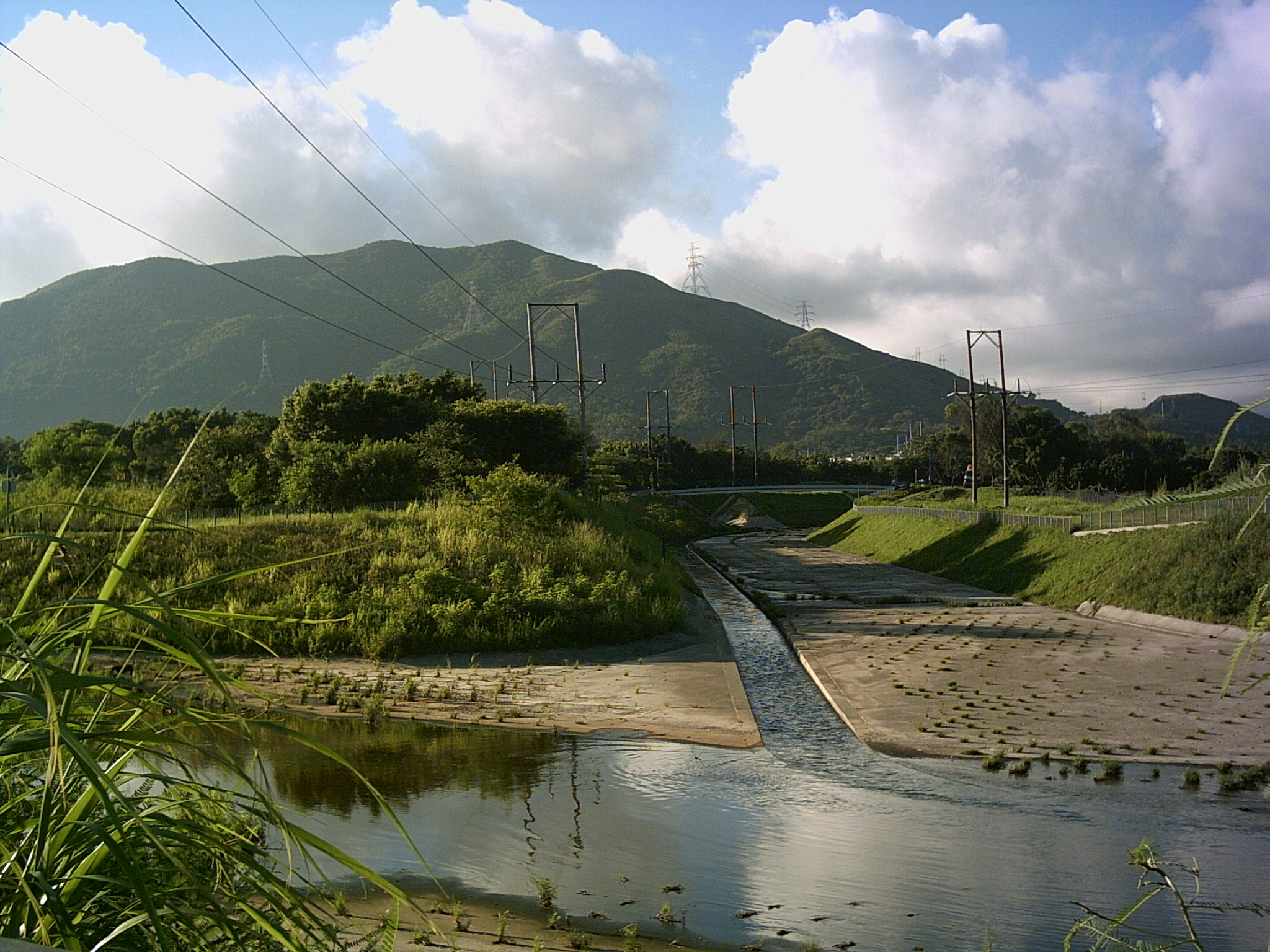
Ma Wat River joining the Ng Tung River

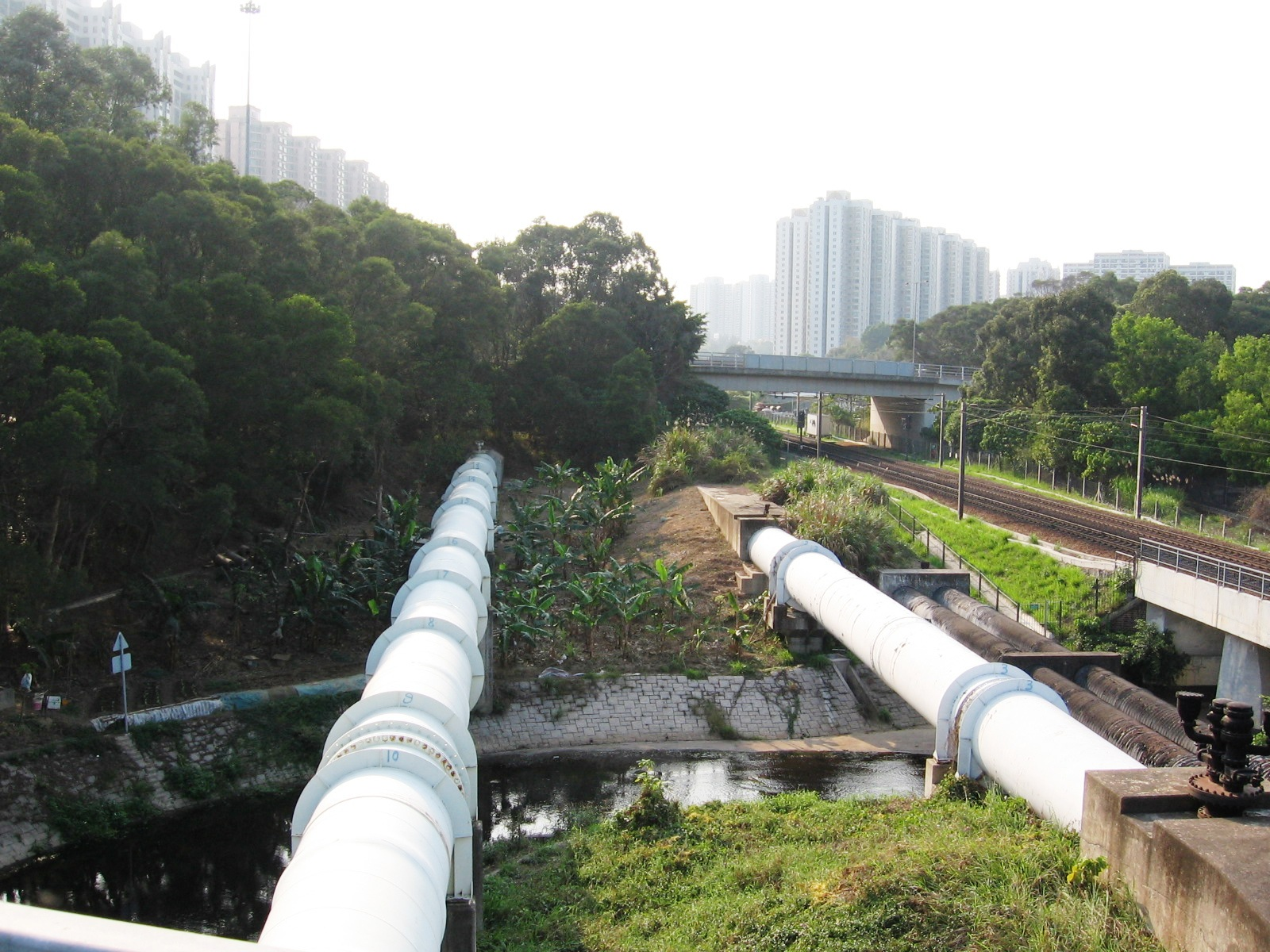
Ma Wat River runs through under water pipes and KCR East Rail

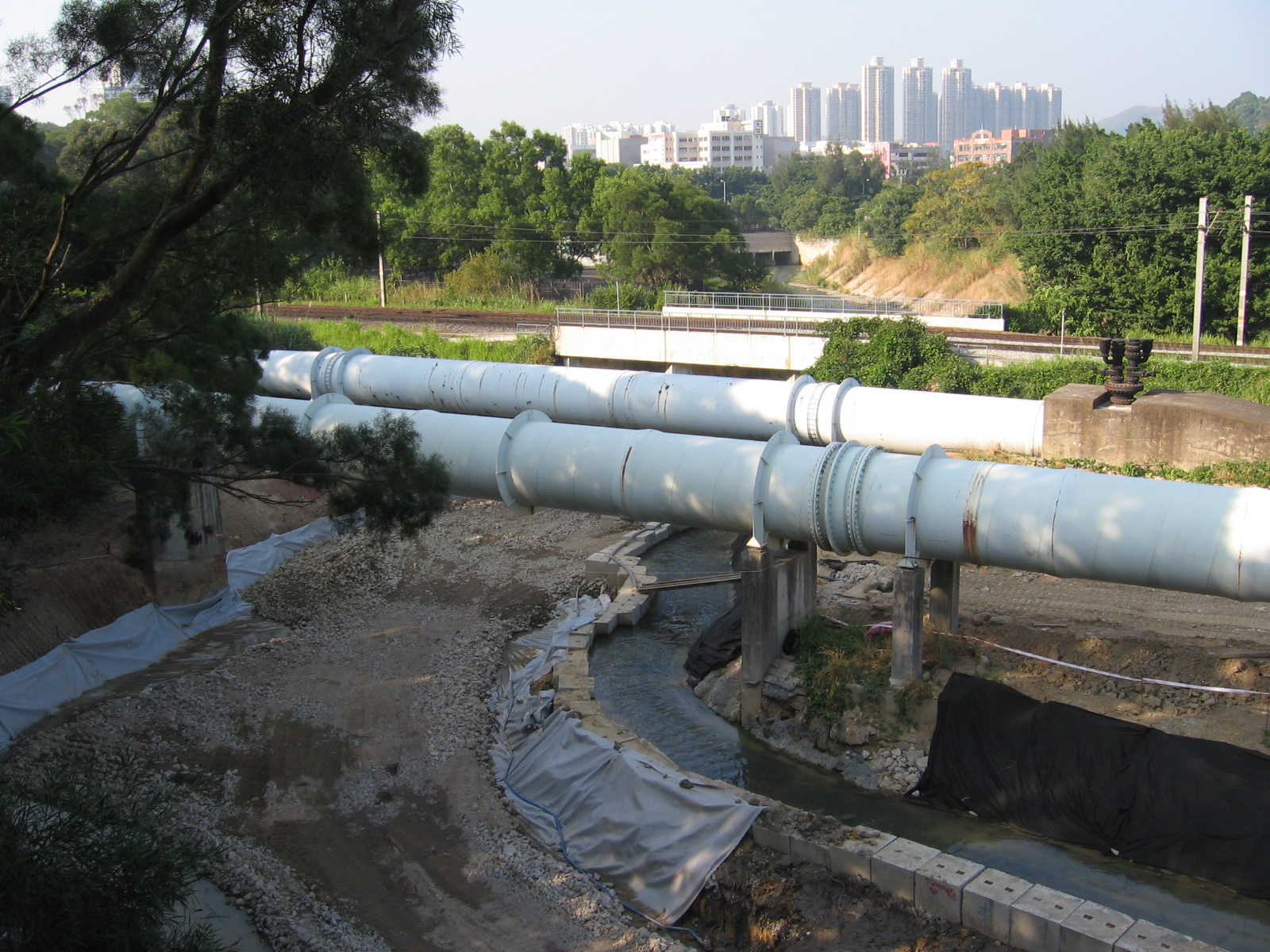
The construction site for drainage improvement project under water pipes

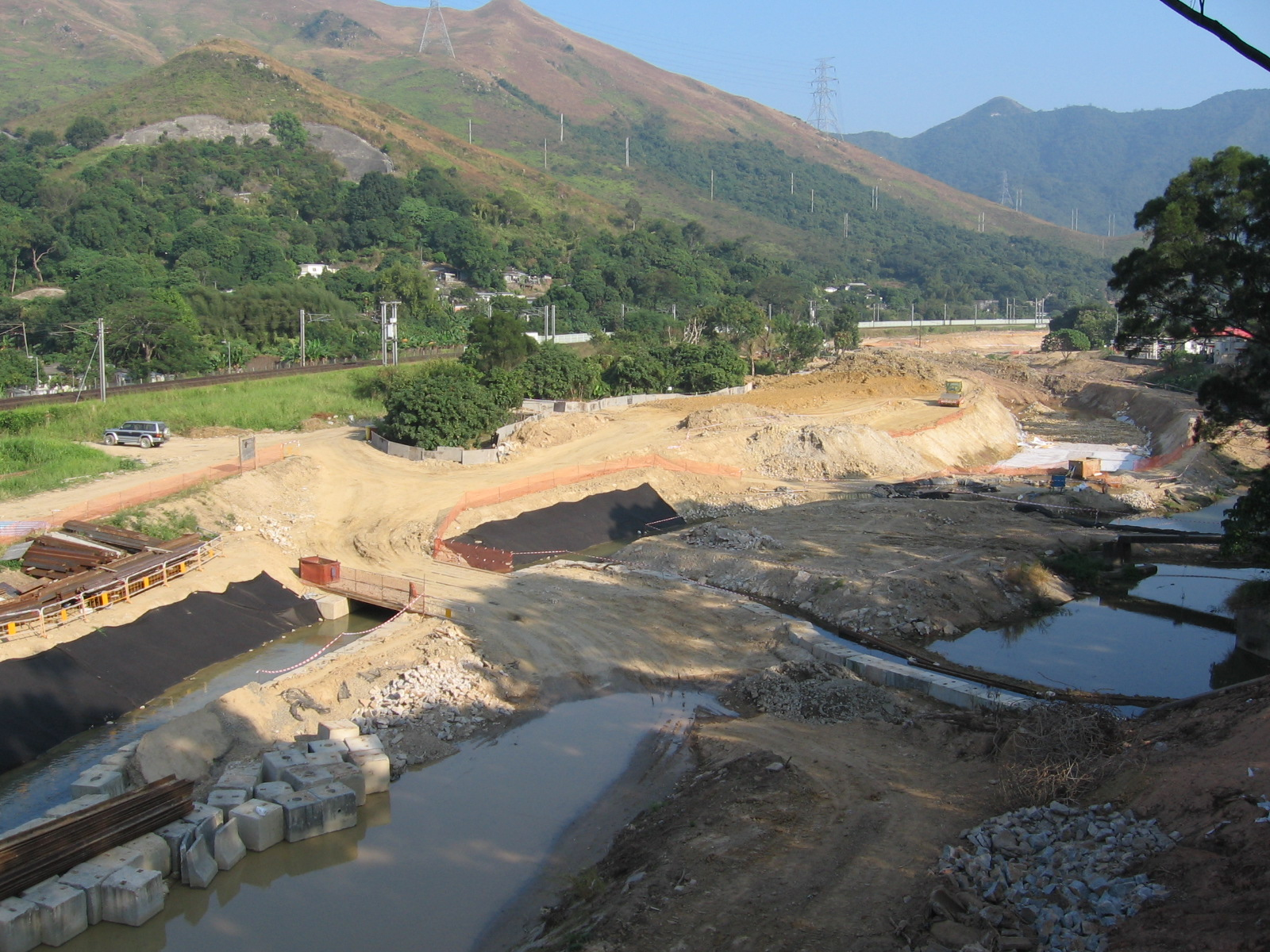
The construction site for drainage improvement project near Tong Hang, Fanling

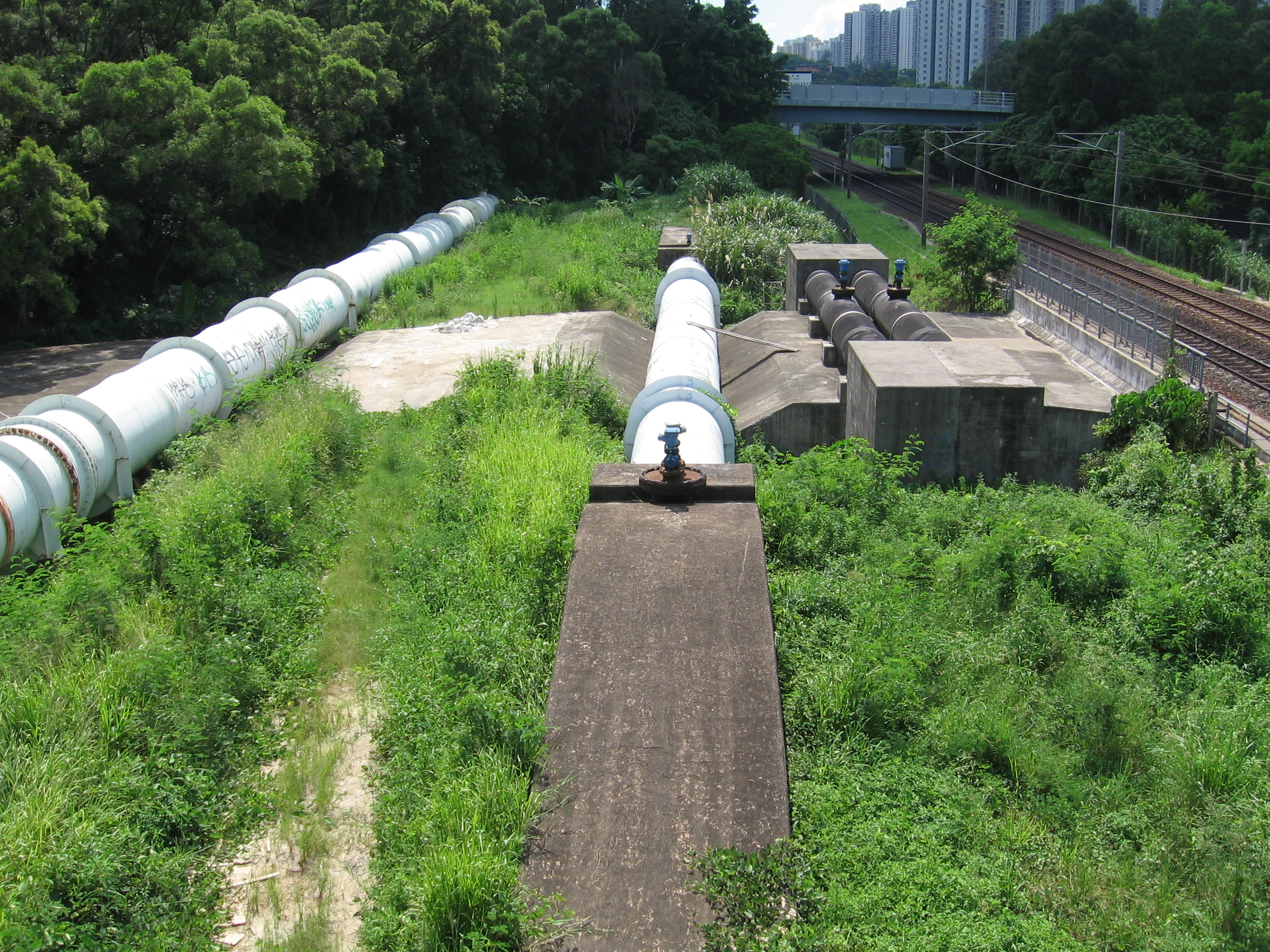
After improvement works, a covered drainage system fill in its river section.

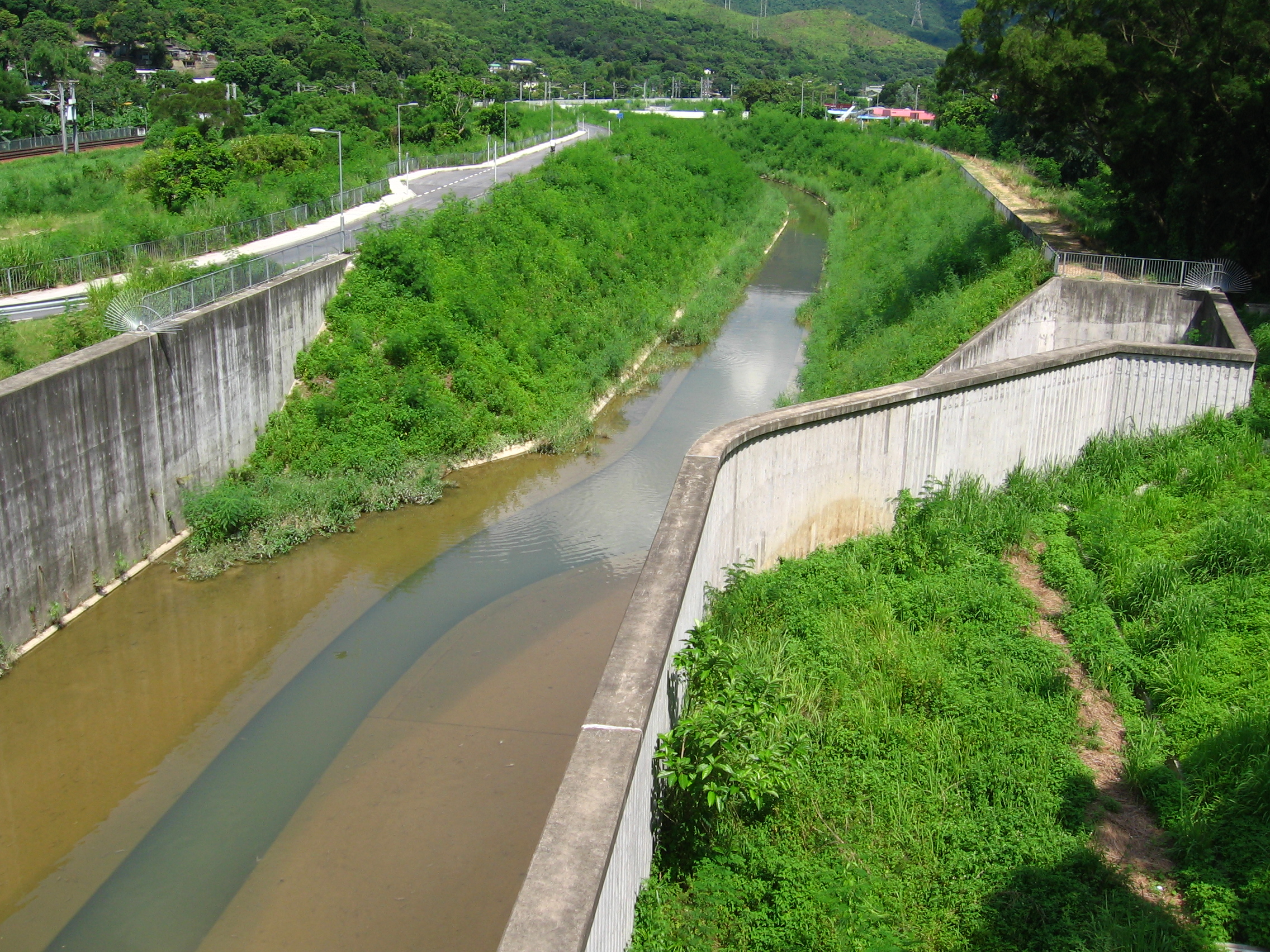
After improvement works, shot near Tong Hang

The Ma Wat River (Chinese: 麻笏河) is a river in Fanling, northern New Territories, Hong Kong. Its source lies at Kau Lung Hang Shan. The river flows northwards towards Fanling, staying near the eastern industrial areas. It empties into the Ng Tung River near Kan Lung Tsuen.

== See also ==
- List of rivers and nullahs in Hong Kong
