= Sheung Yue River =

River in Hong Kong

Coordinates: 22.5150°N 114.1151°E

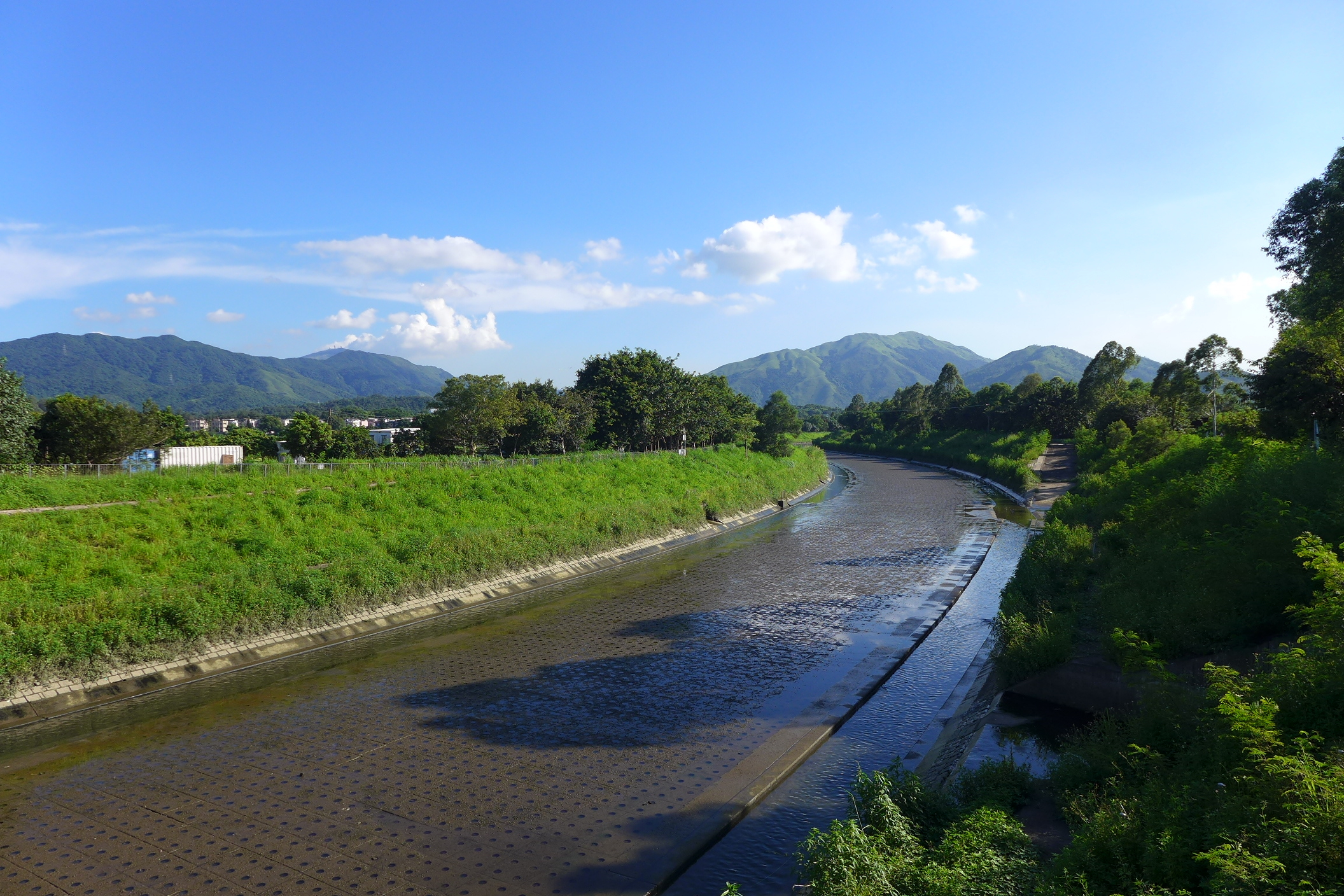
Sheung Yue River at sunset

The Sheung Yue River (Chinese: 雙魚河; Hong Kong Hakka: Sung^{1}ng^{2} Ho^{2}; also known as the River Beas) is a river in the northern New Territories, Hong Kong. Its sources are near Kai Kung Leng and Ki Lun Shan, where numerous streams flow into the river. It flows through Kwu Tung and Sheung Shui. It joins up with the Shek Sheung River and eventually empties into the Ng Tung River.

Beas River Country Club is located near the river. The country club was a venue for the 2008 Olympic Equestrian events.

== See also ==
- List of rivers and nullahs in Hong Kong
