= Sha Tau Kok River =

River between Hong Kong and Shenzhen, China

Coordinates: 22.5416°N 114.1306°E

The Sha Tau Kok River (Chinese: 沙頭角河; pinyin: Shātóujiǎo Hé; Hong Kong Hakka: Sa^{1}tiu^{2}gok^{5} Ho^{2}), is a river between Hong Kong and Shenzhen serving as a part of the land border between Hong Kong SAR and Mainland China.

Along with Sham Chun River and Chung Ying Street, the river serves as the natural boundary between the Special Administrative Region of Hong Kong and the Special Economic Zone of Shenzhen. It is situated at the northeastern corner of North District, Hong Kong and the southeastern corner of Shenzhen, Guangdong. It flows from its source at the Sham Chun River near Pak Kung Au and eastward into Starling Inlet, which is then connected to Mirs Bay.

== See also ==
- List of rivers and nullahs in Hong Kong
