= Subterranean rivers in Hong Kong =

Many places in Hong Kong got their names from rivers. With urban development, many of these rivers are converted into sewers, as it is difficult to stop them flowing downhill. According to the scholar Steve R. Hencher and his coauthors, "Subsurface erosion due to concentrated underground water flow is quite common in weathered rock and colluvial terrain in Hong Kong and the adverse effect on slope stability has long been recognised."

== List of subterranean rivers ==
- Kwai Chung
- Kai Tak Nullah (partly)
- Sai Wan Ho
- Tai Hang
- Tsak Yue Chung (lower course)
- Tsui Ping Nullah (middle course)
- Wong Nai Chung

== See also ==
- Subterranean river
- Subterranean rivers of London
