= Kheer Bhawani Temple =

Hindu temple in Kashmir, India

Kheer Bhawani
- Khir, Ksheer, Kshir Bhawani, Ragnya Devi temple, Tulmul temple
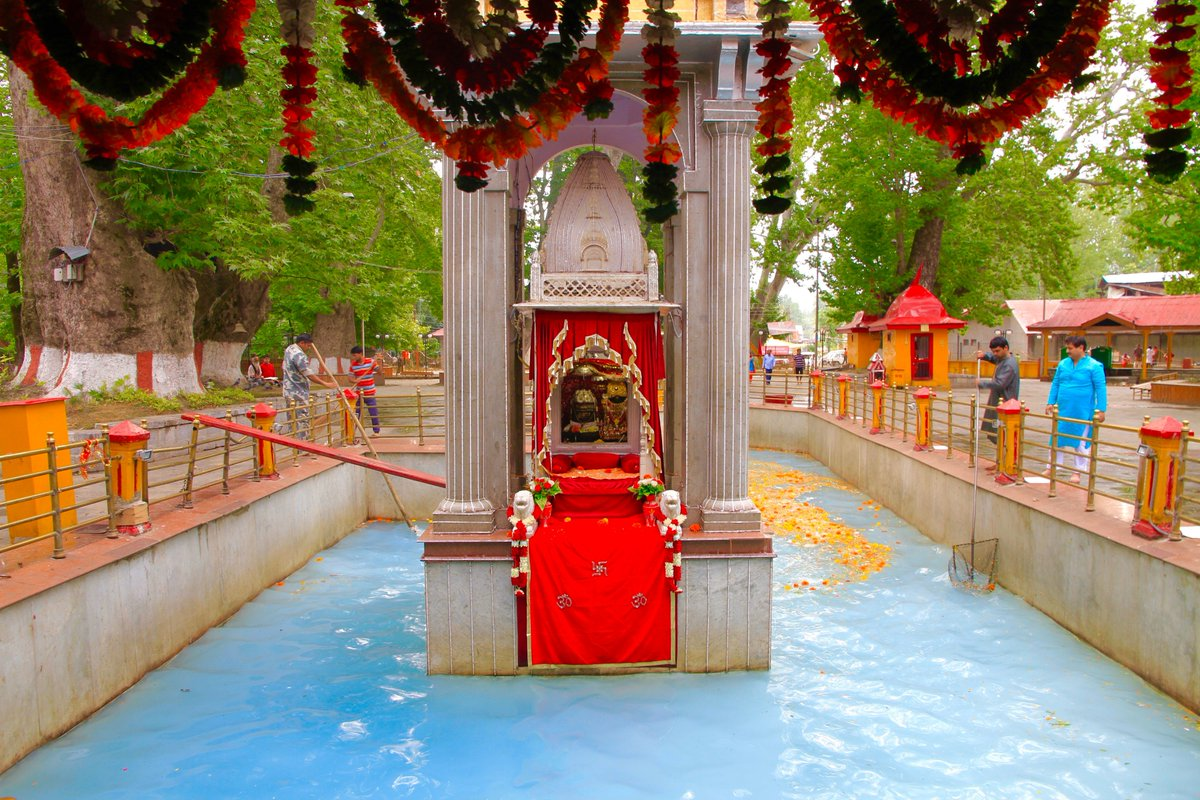
- The Goddess in an atmalinga form (see Linga) at Kheer Bhawani

- Location within Jammu and Kashmir Location within India

Religion
- Affiliation: Hinduism
- Deity: Ragnya Devi
- Festivals: Mela Kheer Bhawani, Jyeshtha Ashtami

Location
- Location: Tulmulla, Ganderbal
- Country: India
- Coordinates: 34°13′16″N 74°43′48″E

Architecture
- Elevation: 1,592 m (5,223 ft)

Kheer Bhawani, Ksheer Bhawani or the Ragnya Devi temple (Note: Also spelt as Khir Bhawani, Kshir Bhawani. Also referred to as the Tula Mula shrine or mandir, the Ragnya Devi temple. and Mata Kheer Bhawani Temple (where mata is an honorific). The spring has been referred to as a Kund which translates to pond or temple tank.) is a Hindu temple situated at a distance of 25 kilometres (16 mi) north-east of Srinagar, Jammu and Kashmir, India, in the village of Tulmulla (Note: Also spelt Tul Mul, Tulmula, Tulamulla, Tulmulla, Tulla Mulla, Tullamula, and Tullamulla. Some people are of the opinion that there was a mulberry tree near holy spot of Kheer Bhawani which, in local language, is called tul mul. But tul mul is also derived from the Sanskrit word atulya mulya meaning great value.) in Ganderbal. It is dedicated to the Hindu goddess Kheer Bhavani constructed over a sacred spring. As is the custom with Hindu deities, the goddess has many names including Ragnya or Rajna, (Note: Maharagya Devi, Ragnya Devi, Rajni, Ragini, Ragniya, Ragnya Bhagwati, Maharagya, Maharagnya Bhagwati where 'devi', 'mata', maha, and 'bhagwati' are honorifics) along with variations in honorifics such as Devi, Mata or Bhagavati. The term kheer refers to a milk and rice pudding that is offered to propitiate the goddess. Kheer Bhawani is sometimes translated as 'Milk Goddess'. The worship of Kheer Bhawani is universal among the Hindu Kashmiris, most of whom worship her as their protective patron deity (Kuladevi). She is also considered Kuladevi by the Chandraseniya Kayastha Prabhu community.

The sacred spring here has its own attached belief. An eponymously named mela is held annually here. It is one of the largest gatherings of Hindus in the region following the Amarnath pilgrimage. Maharaja Pratap Singh of Jammu and Kashmir and Maharaja Hari Singh contributed to building and renovating the temple.

There are other temples to Kheer Bhawani in the region, such as Mata Kheer Bhawani Temple at Tikker, Kupwara.

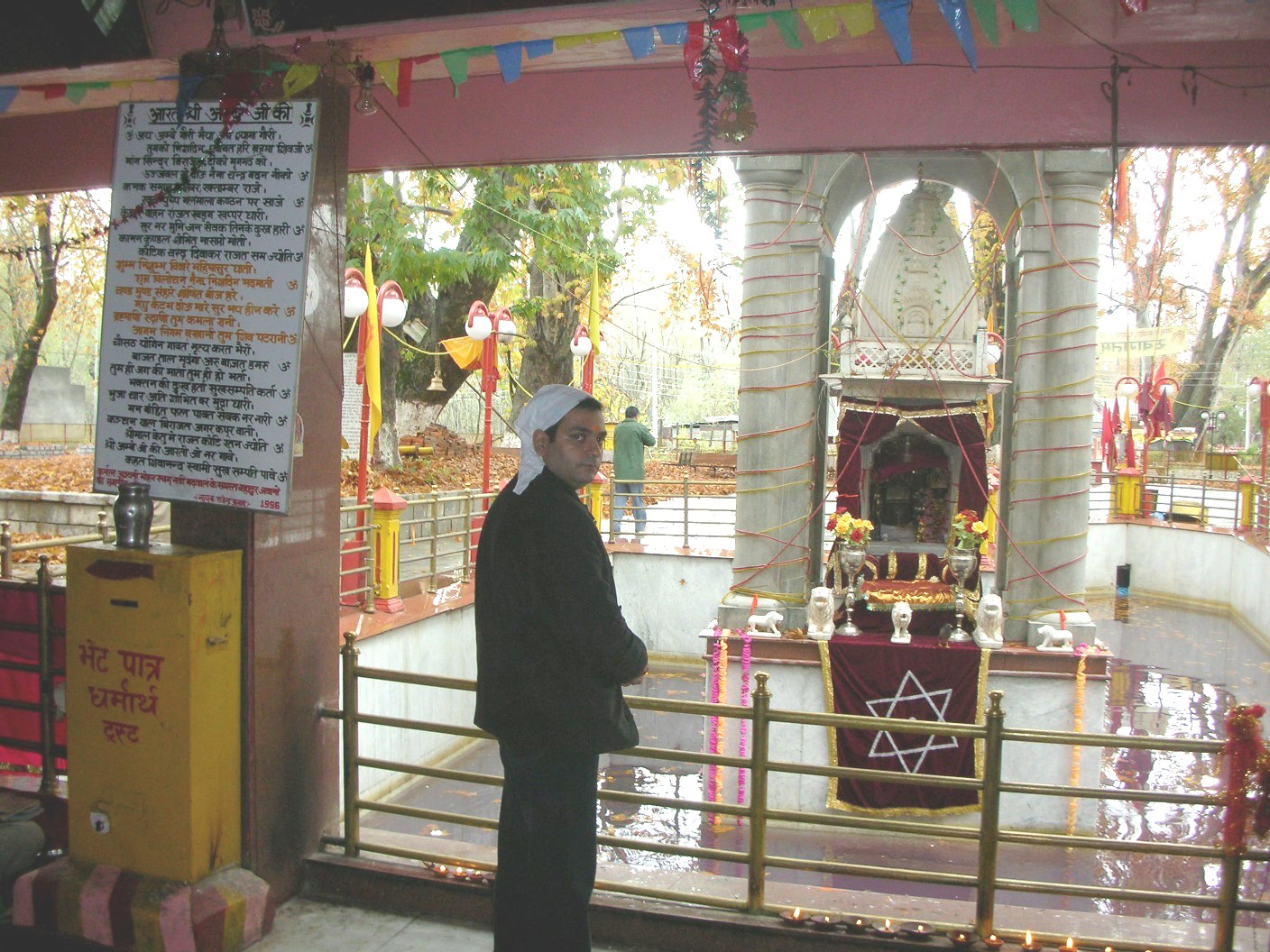
Devotee at the Temple

== Temple description ==
The temple is one of the most important temples for Kashmiri Hindus in Kashmir. The resident deity, Kheer Bhawani, is a favourite in this region. A heptagonal spring at the temple is situated around the goddess. The holy spring is known to change its colour with various hues of red, pink, orange, green, blue, and white. A black shade of the spring water is believed to be inauspicious. It was reported that the spring's colour turned black during the time of Kashmiri Pandit Exodus and even the month prior to the COVID-19 pandemic the spring's colour was observed to be black. Most of the colours do not have any particular significance. In 1886, Walter Lawrence, the-then British settlement commissioner for land, during his visit to the spring, reported the water of the spring to have a violet tinge. Maharaja Ranbir Singh was the first to construct a dharmashala here. The current form of the spring, temple pond, and temple were built under Maharaja Pratap Singh of Jammu and Kashmir in the 1910s. Maharaja Hari Singh further renovated the temple. The temple area has old-growth chinar trees beneath which the pilgrims sit or sleep on mats of grass.

== Kheer Bhawani mela ==
The Kheer Bhawani mela or festival sees the annual congregation of Kashmiri Hindus, and other pilgrims and tourists. The mela is during Jyeshtha Ashtami, also spelt as 'Zyeshta Astami'. The mela was threatened during Islamist terrorism and Hindu exodus of 1990. It was restored with dedicated efforts of the Indian Army contingent placed at Ganderbal. The contingent of 115 BN CRPF is deployed at the temple complex for many years now. This place is one of the few exception where Hindu priests never left the Mandir despite serious terrorist threats.

== History ==
The mention of Kheer Bhawani is found in Kalhana's Rajtarangini. Kalhana writes that the sacred spring of Tula Mula is situated in a marshy ground. Thousands of years ago, floods inundated the spring and temple. Kashmir's Yogi Krishna Pandit Taploo of Bohri Kadal, Srinagar had a dream in which the Goddess appeared to him and directed him to the location of the holy spring. It is also mentioned in the Bhrigu Samhita.

Abu'l-Fazl ibn Mubarak in his book Aini-Akbari mentions the area of Tula Mula extending over a region of hundred bighas (unit of land area) of land, which used to sink in the marshy lands during the summer season.

== See also ==
- Shankaragaurishvara Temple
- Martand Sun Temple
- utpala dynasty
- Awantipora
