= Lead Mine Pass =

Mountain pass in Hong Kong

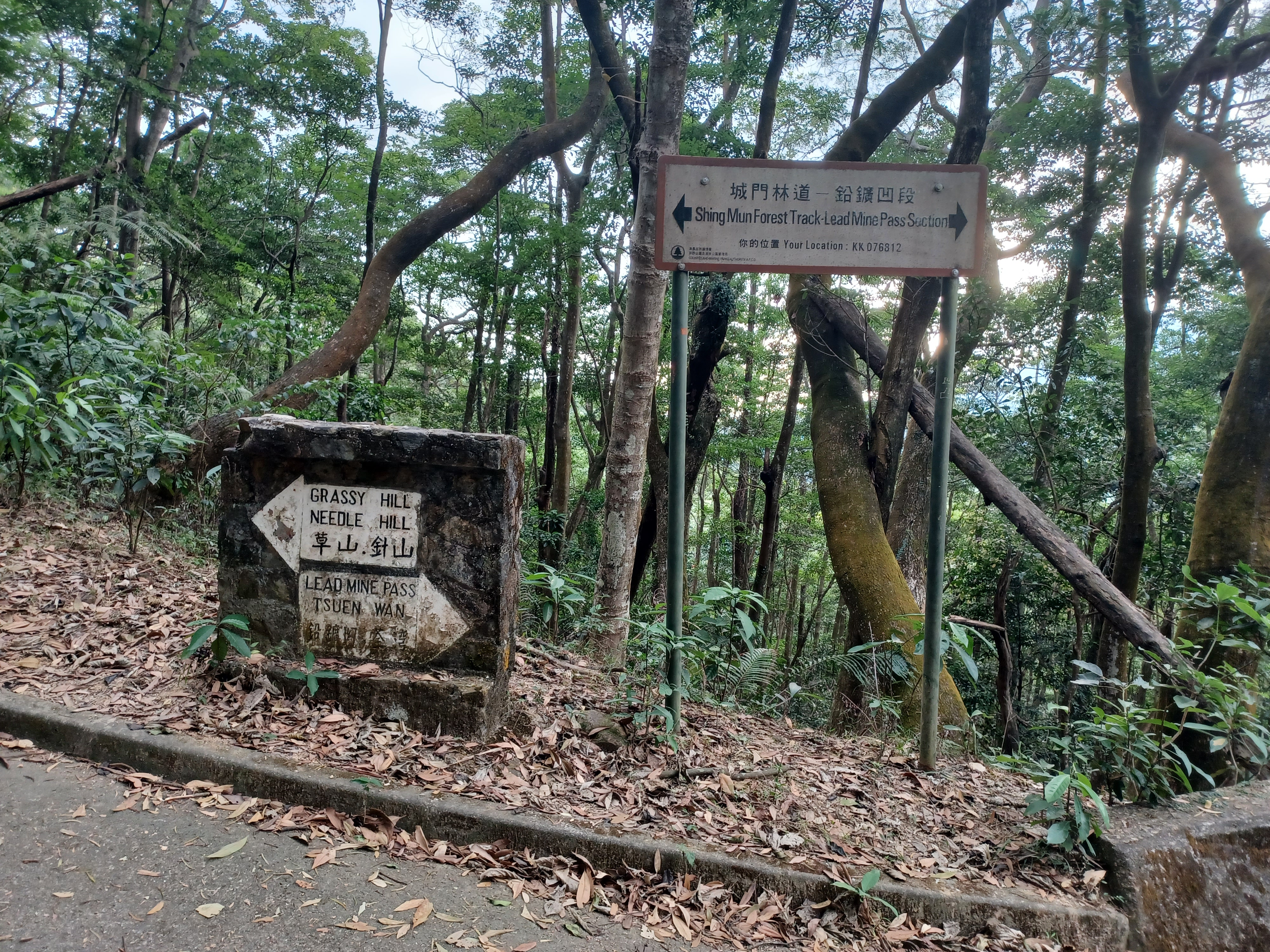
- The signs pointing towards the abandoned Lead Mine Pass. (Image taken in 2021)

- Location within Hong Kong
- Location: South of New Territories, Hong Kong; 22°24′45.09″N 114°9′28.95″E
- Products: tungsten, lead, zinc, copper
- Discovered: 1935
- Opened: 1938
- Closed: 1967

Lead Mine Pass
- Traditional Chinese: 鉛礦坳
- Simplified Chinese: 铅矿坳
- Literal meaning: Lead Mine Pass
Transcriptions
Standard Mandarin
- Hanyu Pinyin: Qiān Kuàng Ào
Hakka
- Romanization: Yun4 Kong3 Ao3
Yue: Cantonese
- Yale Romanization: yùhn kong aau
- Jyutping: Jyun4 Kwong3 Aau3

Lead Mine Pass (Chinese: 鉛礦坳; Jyutping: jyun4 kwong3 aau3) is a mountain pass in the New Territories, Hong Kong. It is near Grassy Hill and two walking trails, MacLehose Trail (Stages 7 & 8) and Wilson Trail (Stage 7) intersect at the pass. The pass lies to the north of Shing Mun Reservoir.

== History ==
=== Mining in Lead Mine Pass ===
Tungsten ore were discovered in Lead Mine Pass during the time when the Shing Mun Reservoir was being constructed. Mining of tungsten ore began in 1938. However, due to the Korean War, prices of tungsten rose steeply. Leading to an increase of unlicensed mining in the area. These mining activities eventually stopped in 1967, abandoning operations of all the mining facilities.

Other ores, for instance Lead, Zinc and Copper, were found in Lead Mine Pass and mined.

=== Present day ===
Mining tunnels and facilities can still be found nowadays. They are dangerous to enter as they have not been maintained and has ceased operations.

== See also ==
- List of gaps in Hong Kong
- Shing Mun Country Park
- Tai Po River
