= Ping Yuen River =

River in Hong Kong

Coordinates: 22.5334°N 114.1461°E

The Ping Yuen River (also known as River Ganges) (Chinese: 平原河; Hong Kong Chinese: Ap^{5}li^{4} Ziu^{1}; Hong Kong Chinese: Pin^{2}ngien^{2} Ho^{2}) is a river in the northern New Territories, Hong Kong. Its source lies near Cheung Shan in Ping Che. It flows along Ping Che Road and into the River Ganges Pumping Station near Chau Tin Village before emptying into the Sham Chun River.

== See also ==
- List of rivers and nullahs in Hong Kong
