= Ping Che =

Village in Hong Kong

Coordinates: 22.5236°N 114.1707°E

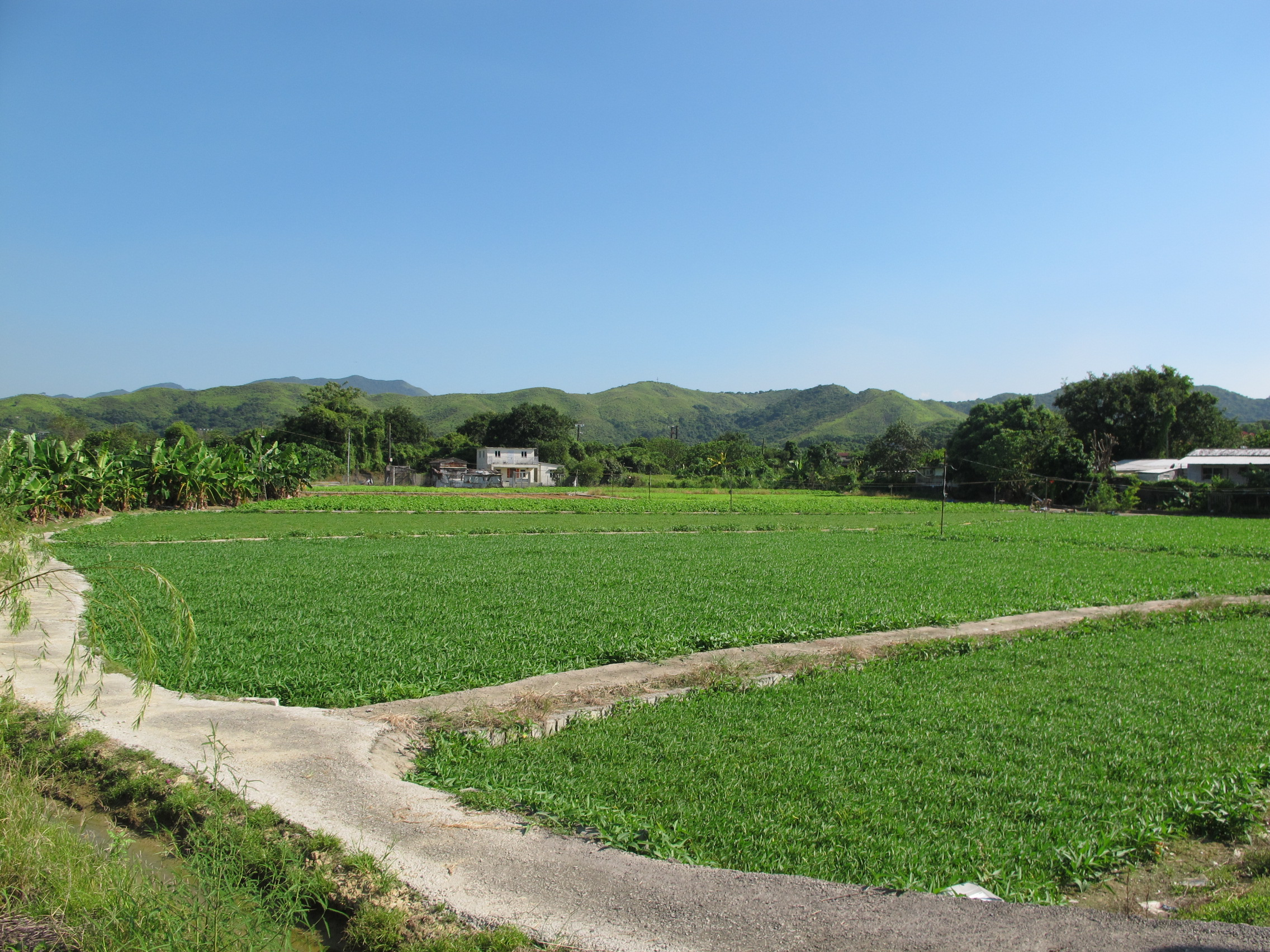
Farmland in Ping Che.

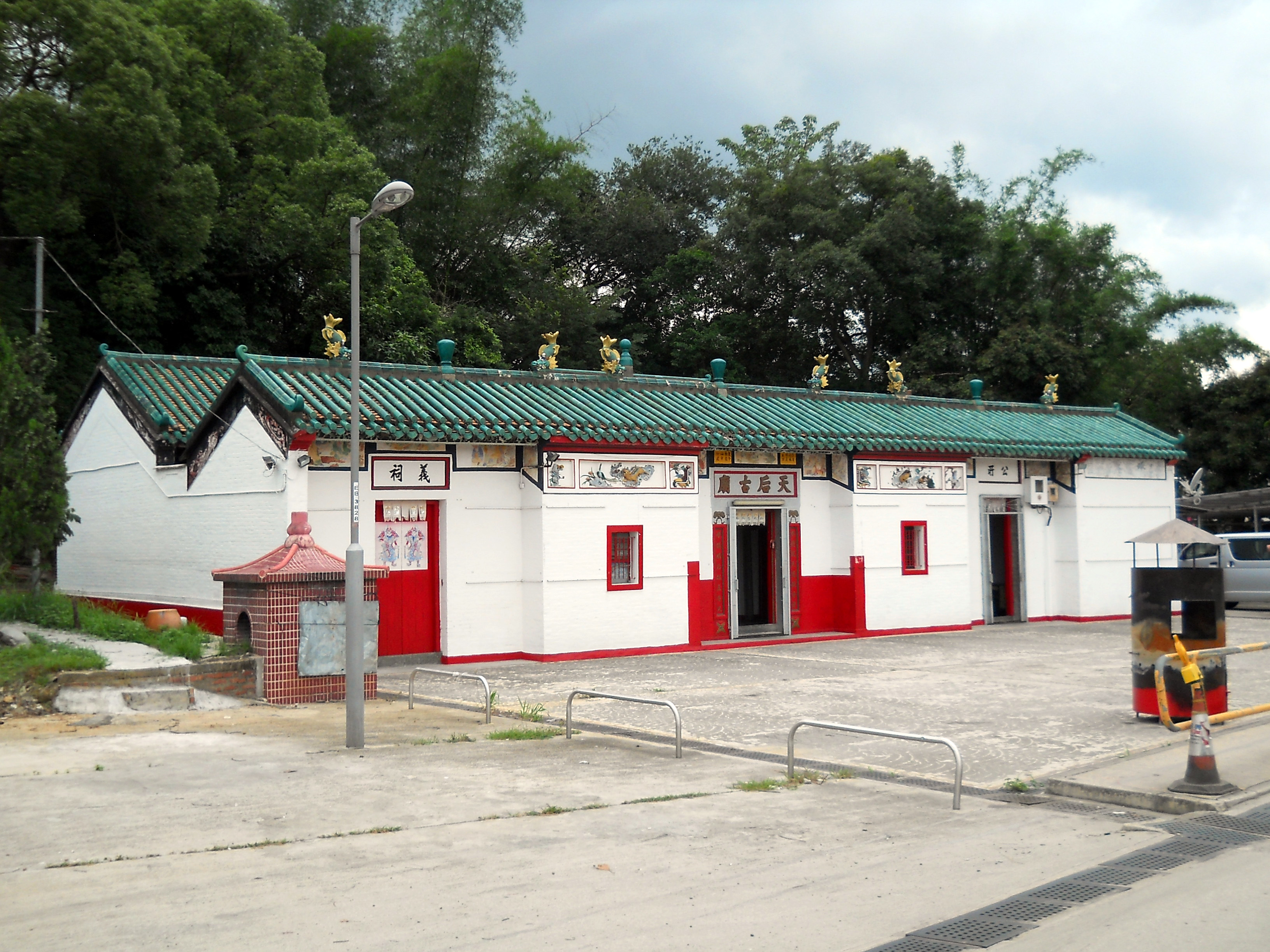
Tin Hau Temple in Ping Che, Ta Kwu Ling.

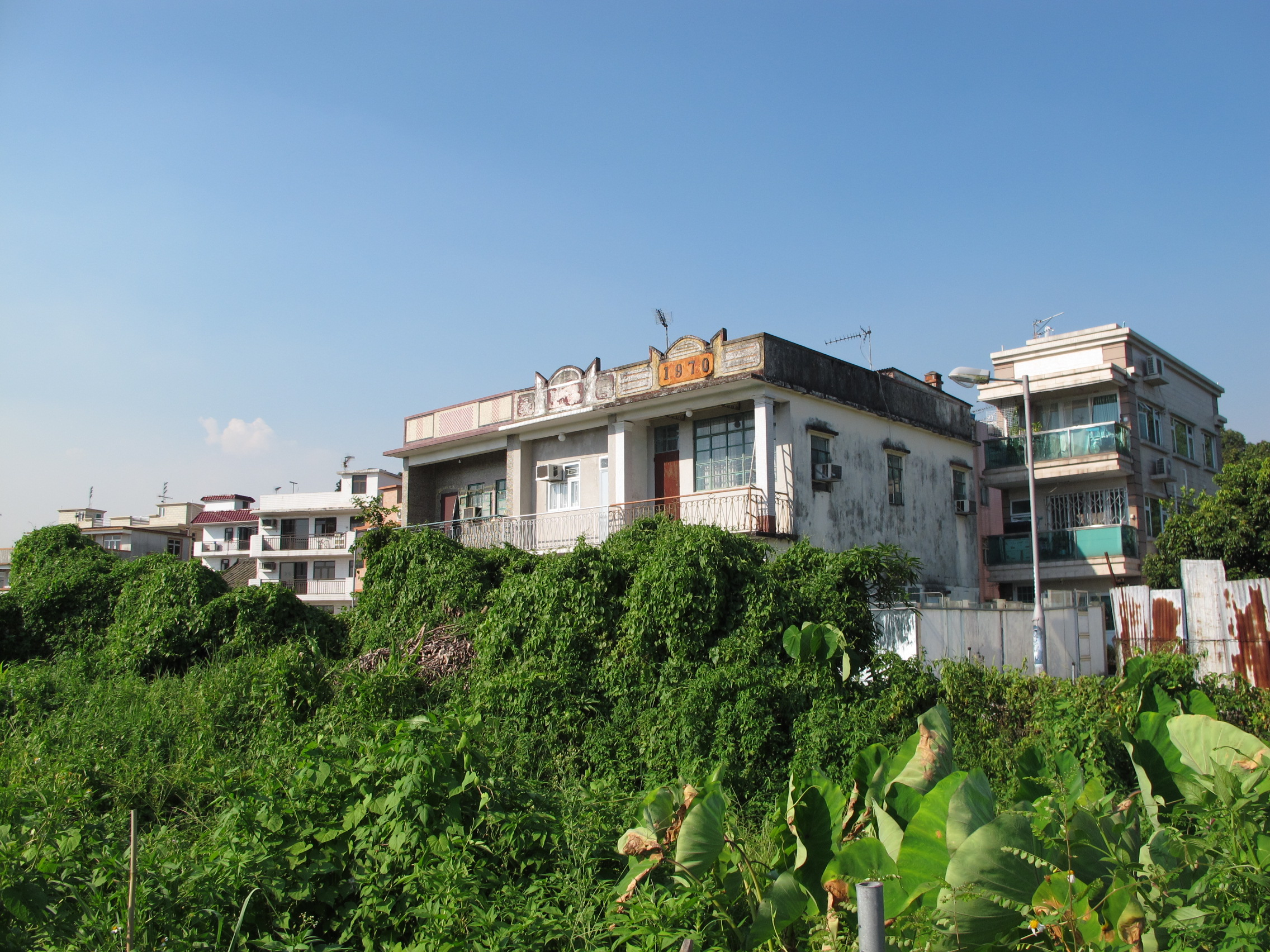
Village houses in Ping Che.

Ping Che (Chinese: 坪輋) is a village in Ta Kwu Ling, North District, Hong Kong.

Che (輋; Jyutping: ce4; literally "clear land for agriculture by burning") refers to the method of farming used by the Che people.

== Administration ==
Ping Che is a recognized village under the New Territories Small House Policy. For electoral purposes, Ping Che is part of the Sha Ta constituency of the North District Council. It is currently represented by Ko Wai-kei, who was elected in the local elections.

== Features ==
The Cheung Shan Monastery in Ping Che is a declared monument. Probably first constructed in 1789, the existing two-hall structure is believed to have been fully rebuilt in 1868.

The Tin Hau Temple in Ping Che is a Grade II Historic Building.

== See also ==
- Ping Yuen River
- Tan Shan River
