= Wong Chuk Yeung (Sha Tin District) =

Village in Hong Kong

Coordinates: 22.397322°N 114.177079°E

Wong Chuk Yeung (Chinese: 黃竹洋) is a village in Fo Tan, Sha Tin District, Hong Kong.

== Administration ==
Wong Chuk Yeung is a recognized village under the New Territories Small House Policy. It is one of the villages represented within the Sha Tin Rural Committee. For electoral purposes, Wong Chuk Yeung is part of the Sui Wo constituency, which was formerly represented by Ken Mak Tsz-kin until July 2021.

== History ==
In the early 20th century, the villagers of Wong Chuk Yeung generated a large part of their income from selling fuel cut from the extensive woods which were to be found near the village. The woods at Wong Chuk Yeung, on the eastern slopes of Grassy Hill, held tigers every year during the breeding season.

== See also ==
- Kau Yeuk (Sha Tin)
