= Shek Sheung River =

River in Hong Kong

Coordinates: 22.5084°N 114.1180°E

- Traditional Chinese: 石上河
- Cantonese Yale: sehk séuhng hòh
Transcriptions
Hakka
- Romanization: Sak^{6} song^{1} ho^{2}
Yue: Cantonese
- Yale Romanization: sehk séuhng hòh
- Jyutping: sek6 soeng5 ho4

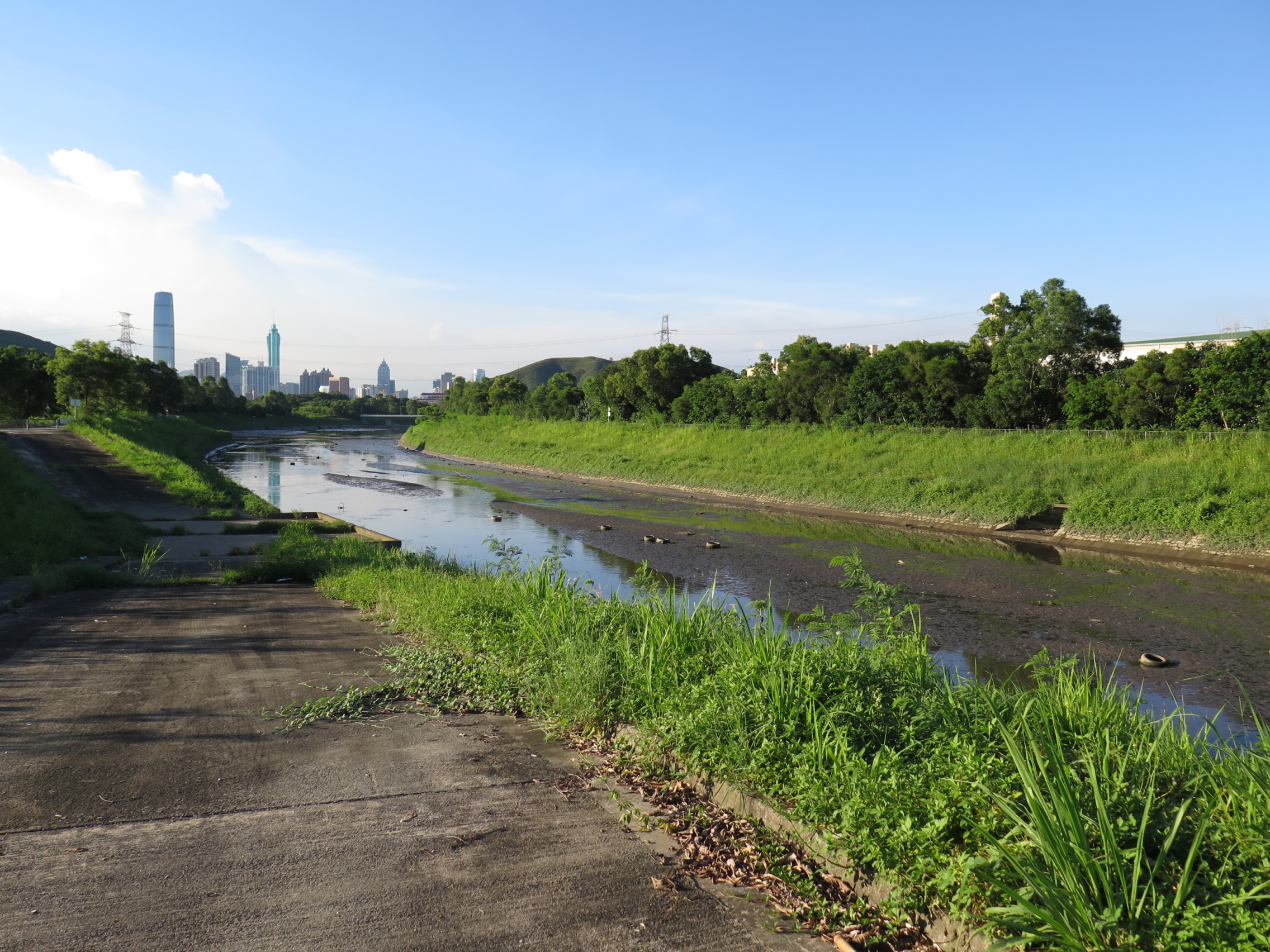
Shek Sheung River

The Shek Sheung River (Chinese: 石上河; also known as River Sutlej), is a river in northern New Territories, Hong Kong. The river originates near Choi Po Court and Hong Kong Golf Club then flows beside the East Rail line before discharging into the Ng Tung River.

== See also ==
- List of rivers and nullahs in Hong Kong
