= Lung Tsun Stone Bridge =

Former bridge in Hong Kong

Coordinates: 22°19′44″N 114°11′41″E

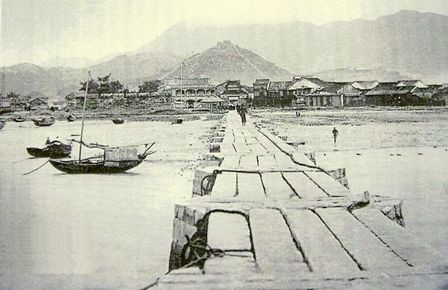

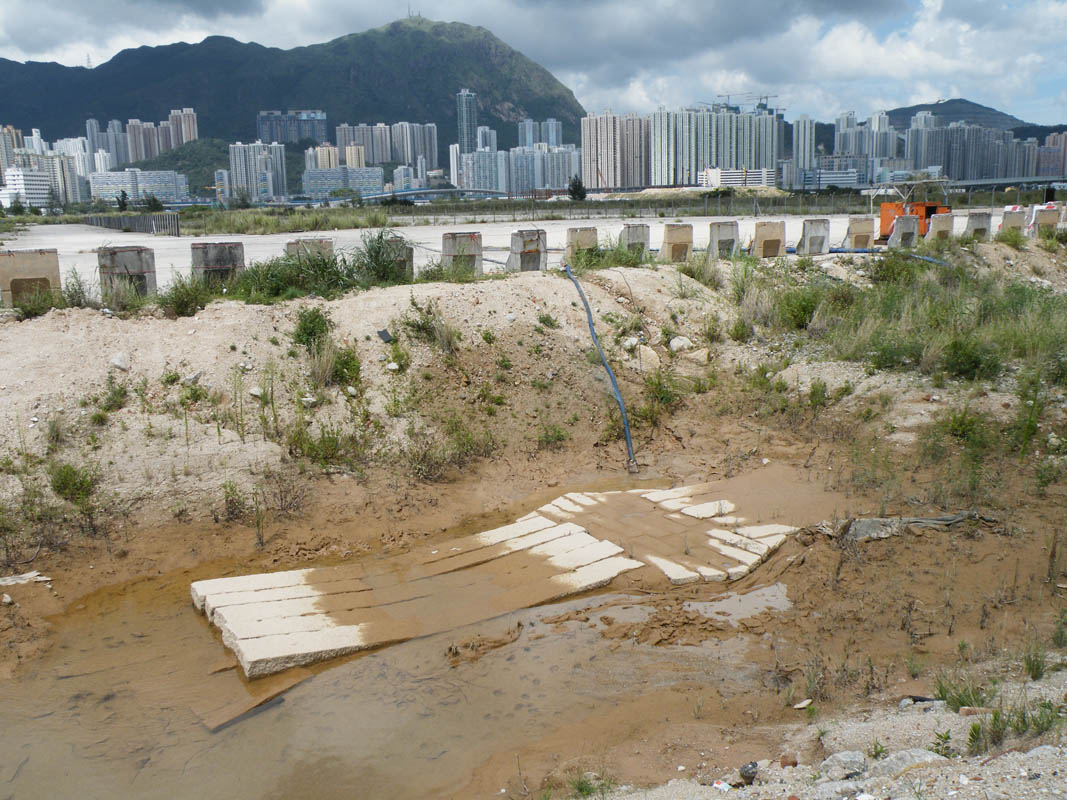
(Above) The Lung Tsun Stone Bridge and the Kowloon Walled City in 1875. (Below) The Lung Tsun Stone Bridge in 2010.

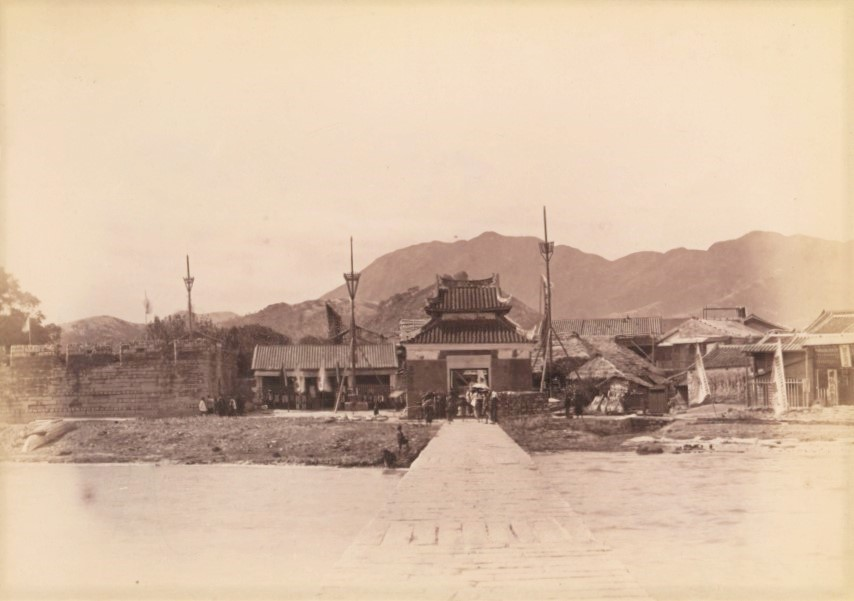
The Lung Tsun Stone Bridge and the Lung Tsun Pavilion (or the "Pavilion for Greeting Officials") of the Kowloon Walled City in 1898.

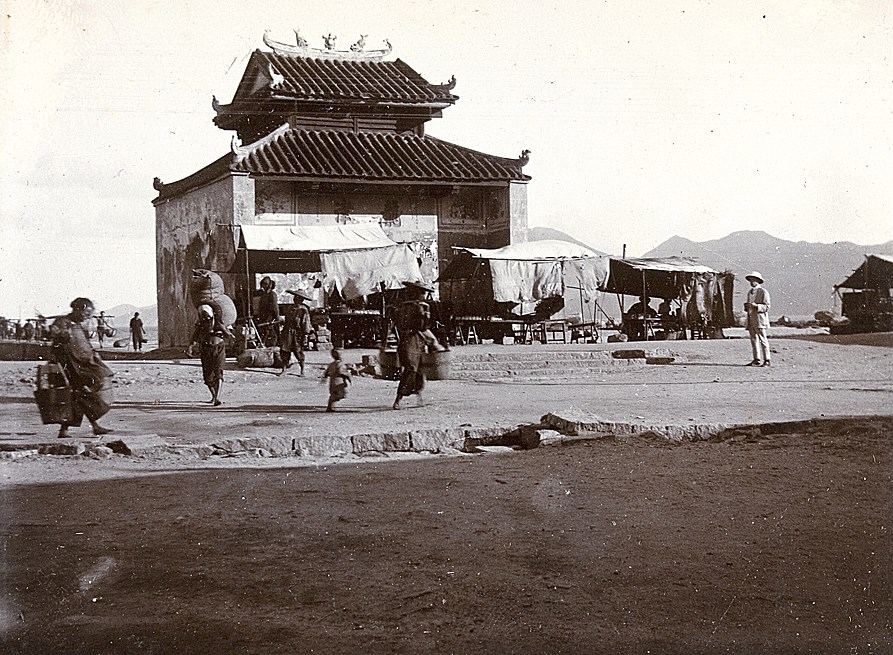
Lung Tsun Pavilion in 1910. The Pavilion was built in 1875 and buried by the Japanese during the expansion of the airport in WWII.

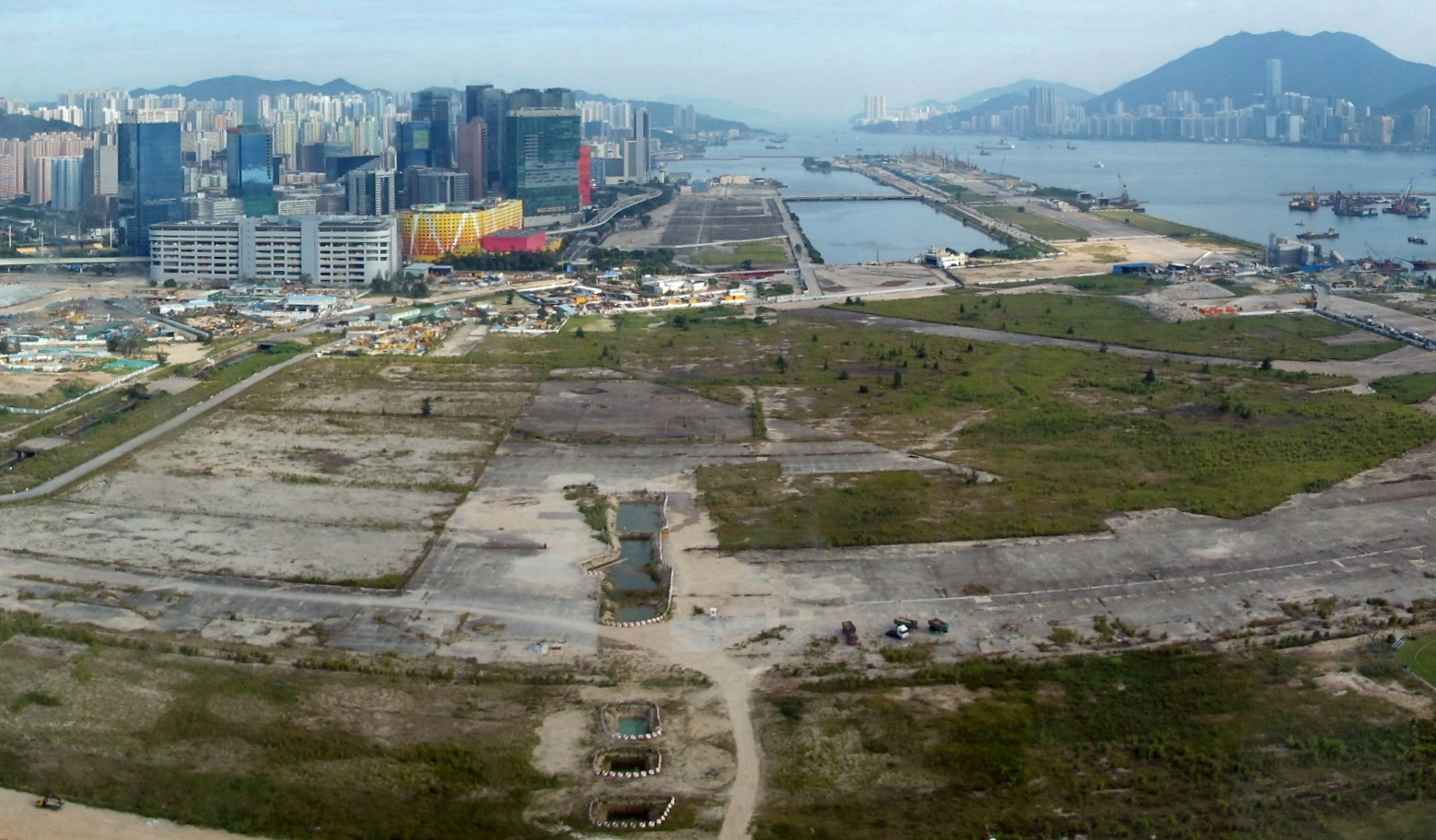
Site of the former Kai Tak Airport, under redevelopment in 2010. The archaeological excavations of the Lung Tsun Stone Bridge are visible in the foreground.

The Lung Tsun Stone Bridge (Chinese: 龍津石橋) was a bridge in British Hong Kong which was buried during the construction of Kai Tak Airport and which connected the Kowloon Walled City to a pier leading into Kowloon Bay.

== History ==
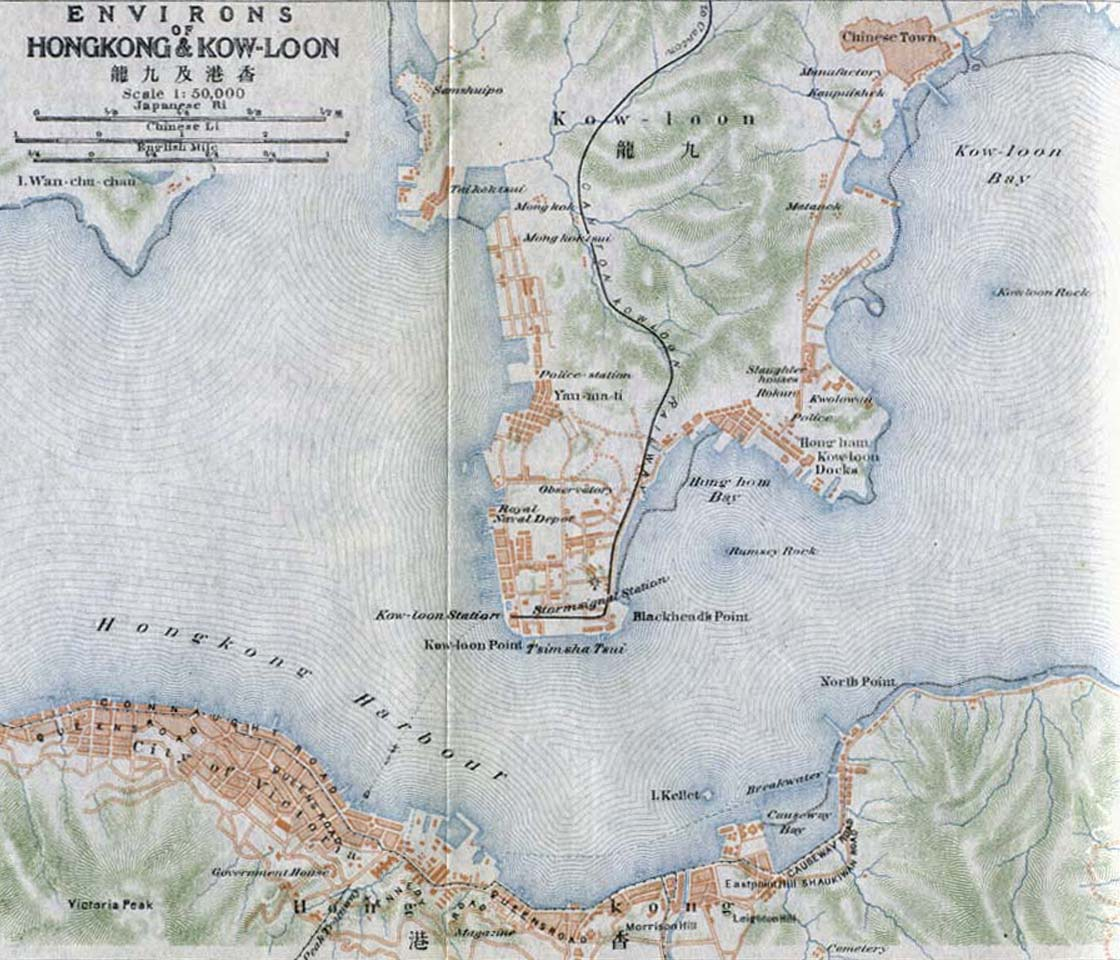
Map in 1915. The red area in the top right corner, labelled "Chinese Town", is Kowloon Walled City. The nearby protruding land is Lung Tsun Stone Bridge.

In middle of the nineteenth century, European merchants used Chinese junks to smuggle goods and opium to the mainland. The Viceroy of Liangguang ordered a checkpoint to be set up in the water channel between Hong Kong and Macau. Due to the replenishment need for the customs ships, the stone bridge was proposed to be built and named after a nearby river, known as the Lung Tsun River.

Gambling was allowed in Hong Kong between 1867 and 1871 but was prohibited in 1872. The casinos moved to the Kowloon Walled City. As a nearby pier, in particular, the Lung Tsun Stone Bridge become a hotspot for many of the foreign gamblers arriving in Hong Kong.

Construction on the bridge began in 1873 and was completed in 1875. The bridge was about 210 metres (690 ft) long and 2.6 metres (8.5 ft) wide and was built from granite. At the time, it was the longest and toughest stone pier in Hong Kong. It was divided into the south and the north. Due to mud deposition surrounding the pier, its length was extended to 300 metres (980 ft) with wood. During the Japanese occupation of Hong Kong in WWII, the bridge was completely covered up when the nearby Kai Tak Airport was expanded.

== Conservation ==
The bridge's remnants were first identified in April 2008. Remnants of the bridge will be preserved in-situ as part of the redevelopment plan for the Kai Tak site.
