= Ng Tung River =

River of Hong Kong

Coordinates: 22°31′46″N 114°06′43″E

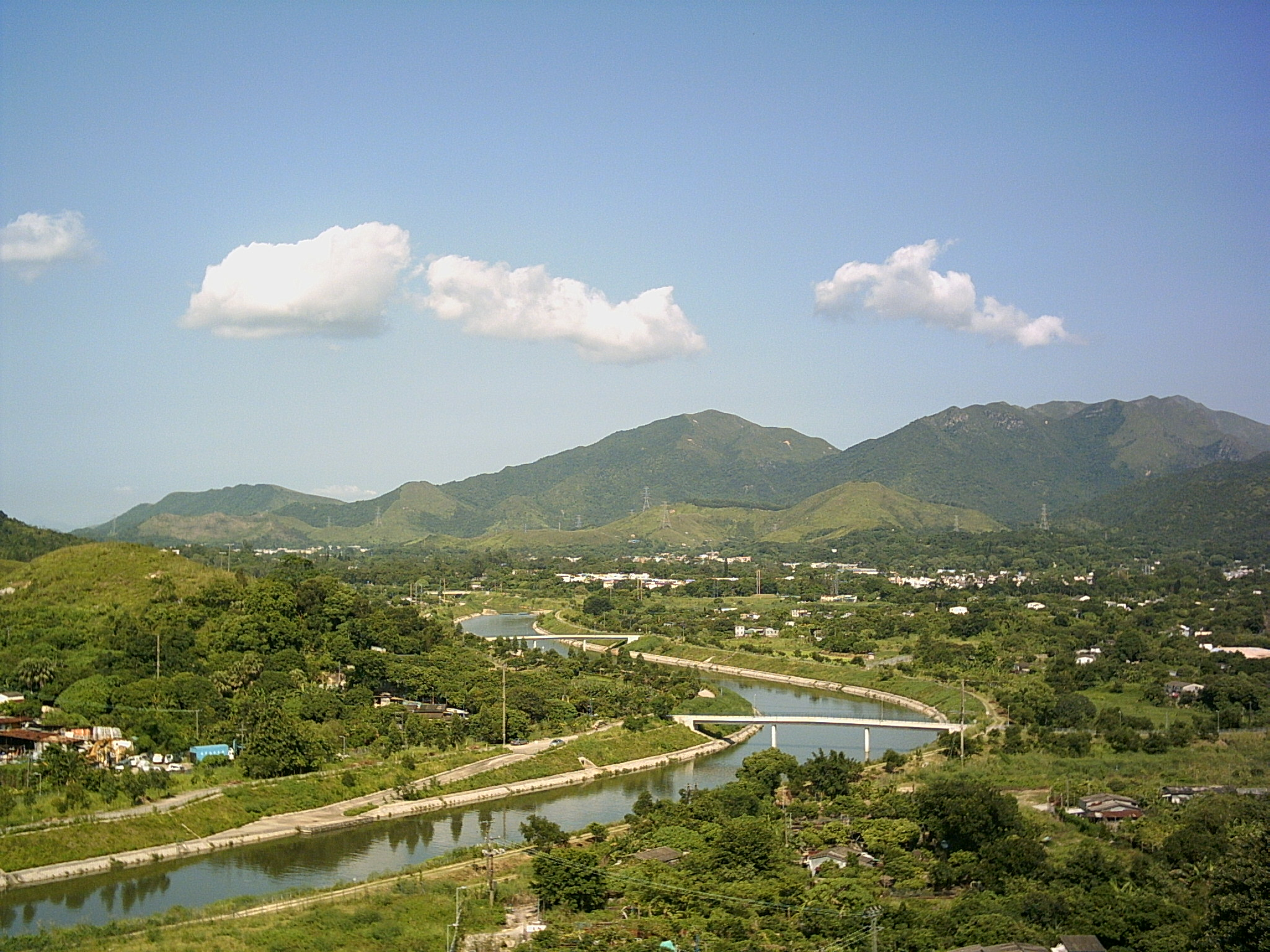
Ng Tung River on a clear day.

The Ng Tung River (Chinese: 梧桐河; Jyutping: ng^{4} tung^{4} ho^{4}; Hong Kong Hakka: Ng^{2}tung^{2} Ho^{2}), also known as the River Indus, is a river in the northeast New Territories, Hong Kong. Tributaries of the river include the Tan Shan River (River Jhelum) and Kwan Tei River. It collects other major rivers like the Shek Sheung River (River Sutlej) and Sheung Yue River (River Beas) in Sheung Shui, and finally empties into the Sham Chun River (Shenzhen River).

== See also ==
- List of rivers and nullahs in Hong Kong
