= Nullah =

Steep, narrow valley

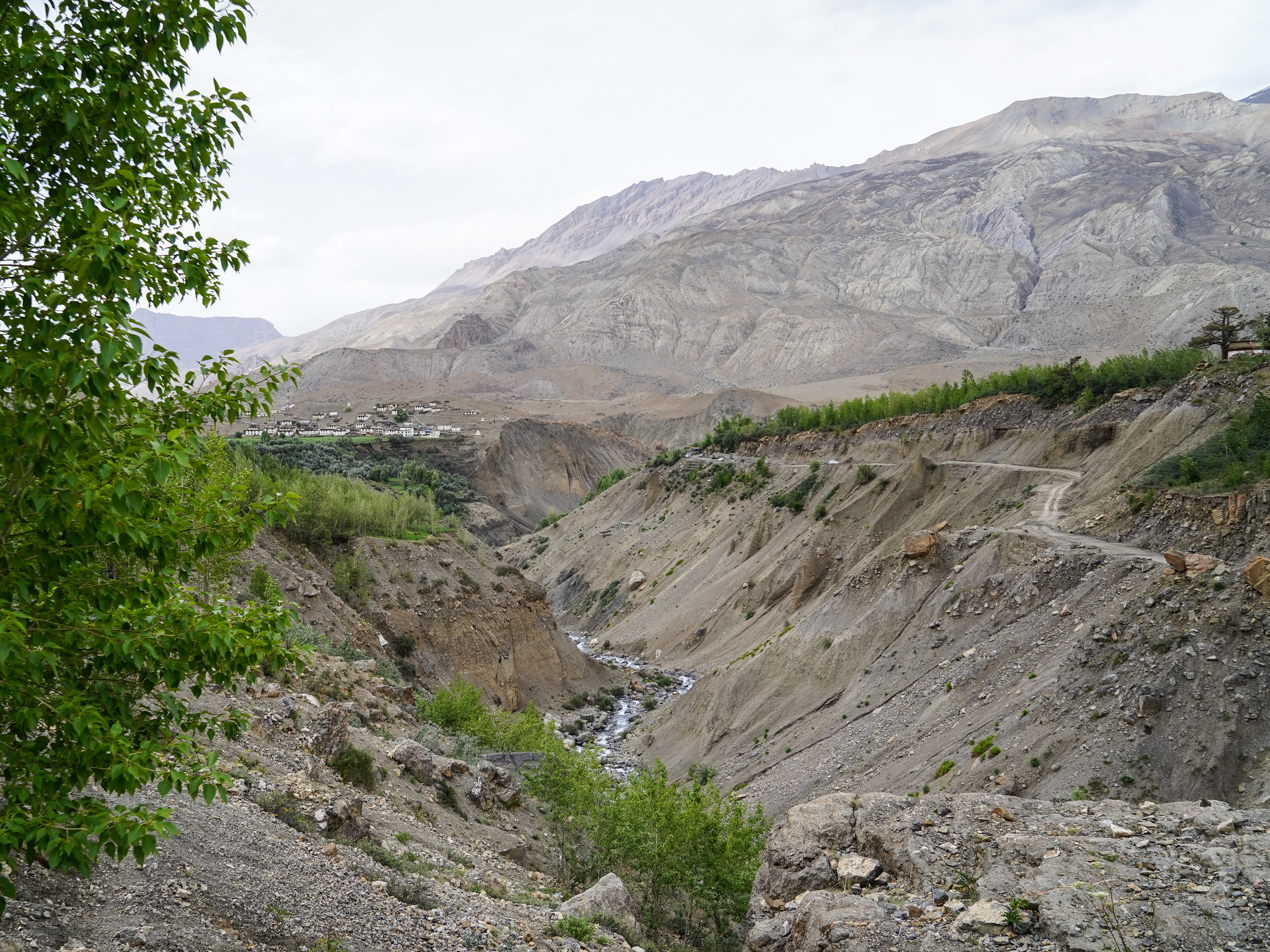
A nullah in Spiti, India

A nullah or nala (Hindustani or "nallah" in Punjabi) is an 'arm of the sea', stream, or watercourse, a steep narrow valley. Like the wadi of the Arabs, the nullah is characteristic of mountainous or hilly country where there is little rainfall.

In the drier parts of India and Pakistan, and in many parts of Australia, there are small steep-sided valleys penetrating the hills, clothed with rough brushwood or small trees growing in the stony soil. During occasional heavy rains, torrents rush down the nullahs and quickly disappear. There is little local action upon the sides, while the bed is lowered, and consequently these valleys are narrow and steep. In cities on the Delhi plain in India, nullahs are concrete or brick-lined ditches about 3 metres (10 ft) deep and 6 metres (20 ft) wide, used to divert monsoon rain away from the cities.

Encroachment into nullahs is a significant problem in many South Asian cities, since it hampers the drainage of stormwater and can exacerbate floods.

== Canal ==
In East Asia, a nullah (Chinese: 明渠; pinyin: míngqú; Wade–Giles: ming^{2}-chʻü^{2}; Jyutping: ming^{4} keoi^{4}; lit. 'open ditch') refers to an open, usually concrete-lined flood control channel designed to allow rapid drainage of stormwater or a sewerage channel for industrial wastewater from high ground, to prevent flooding or stagnation in urbanised coastal areas, and is an often dry canal used as a reserve drain. One such example is the Kai Tak Nullah in Hong Kong.

== List of nullahs ==
- Lai Nullah, Pakistan
- Korang Nullah, Pakistan
- Ling Nullah, Pakistan
- Charding Nullah, Tibet
- Yuen Long Nullah, Hong Kong
- Kai Tak Nullah, Hong Kong
- Tai Wai Nullah, Hong Kong
- Fo Tan Nullah, Hong Kong
- Siu Lek Yuen Nullah, Hong Kong
- Tai Hang Nullah, Hong Kong
- Staunton Creek Nullah, Hong Kong
- Tulmullah Nullah, Kashmir
- Buddha Nullah, India
- Otteri Nullah, India
