= Mataji =

Hindi term

Mataji (Hindi माताजी mātājī) is a Hindi term meaning 'mother of all'.

== Etymology ==
"Mātā" (माता) is the Hindi word for "mother", from Sanskrit mātṛ (मातृ), and the "-jī" (जी) suffix is an honorific suffix used to indicate respect.

== Use ==
"Mataji" is a term used to respectfully address a (Mother or female god) in Bharatiya (Indian) culture, particularly if she is unknown to the speaker. Another term that is sometimes used is the anglicized "auntie". The term is also used for some female spiritual teachers and leaders.

"Mataji" is sometimes used by ISKCON devotees as a title, for example, "Radha Mataji". In some communities, men are encouraged to call all devotee women "Mataji", because according to Vedic culture, all women who are not one's wife are to be treated as one's mother. Many women in ISKCON shun the term and prefer they be called Prabhu, which was a term A. C. Bhaktivedanta Swami Prabhupada, the founder of ISKCON, used to refer to all members, or Devi, meaning goddess in Sanskrit.
