= Grassy Hill =

- 草山
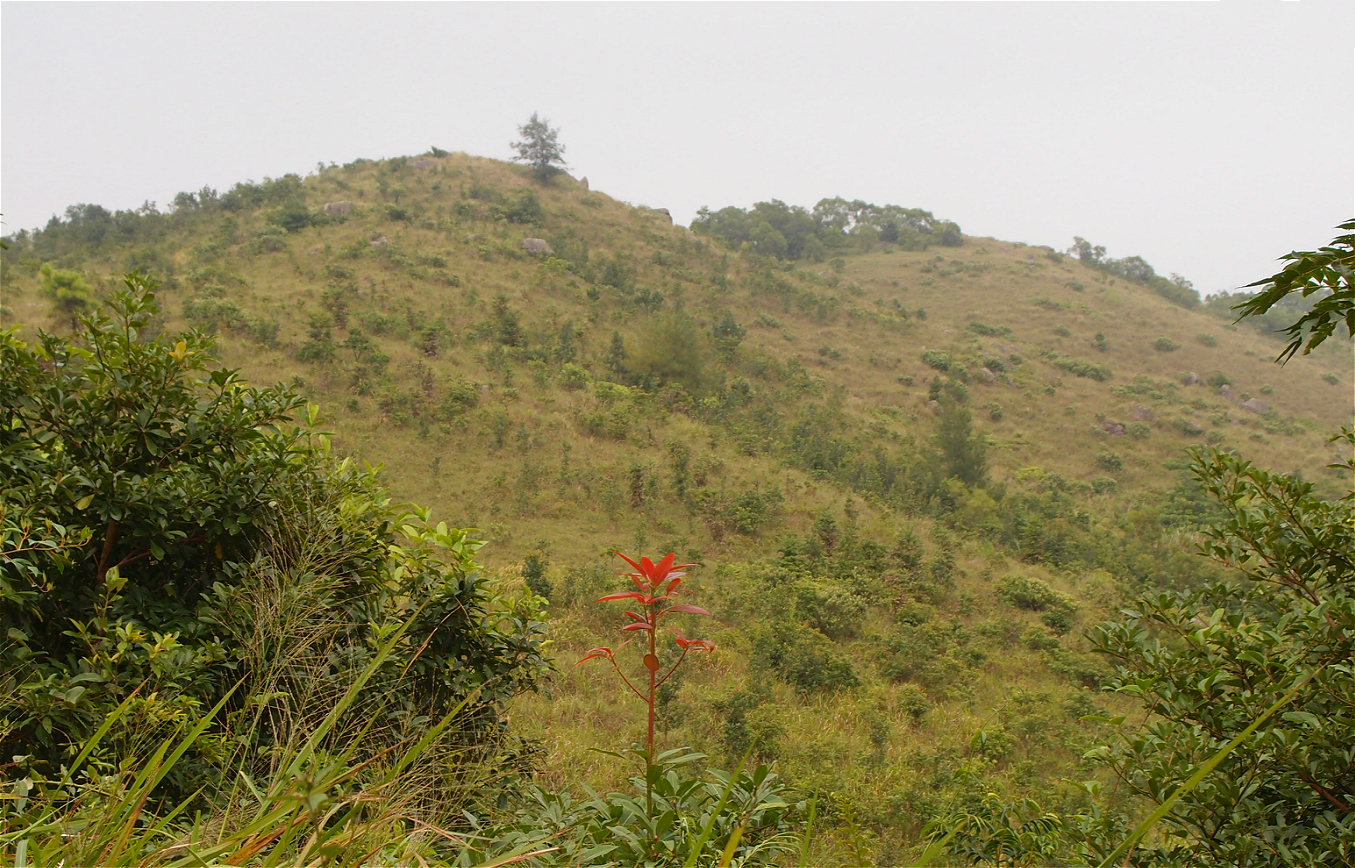
- View of Grassy Hill in September 2015

Highest point
- Elevation: 647 m (2,123 ft)
- Coordinates: 22°24′45″N 114°9′54″E

Geography
- Location within Hong Kong

Grassy Hill
- Chinese: 草山
- Literal meaning: Grass Mountain
Transcriptions
Standard Mandarin
- Hanyu Pinyin: Cǎo Shān
Hakka
- Romanization: Cou2 San1
Yue: Cantonese
- Yale Romanization: chóu sāan
- Jyutping: Cou2 Saan1

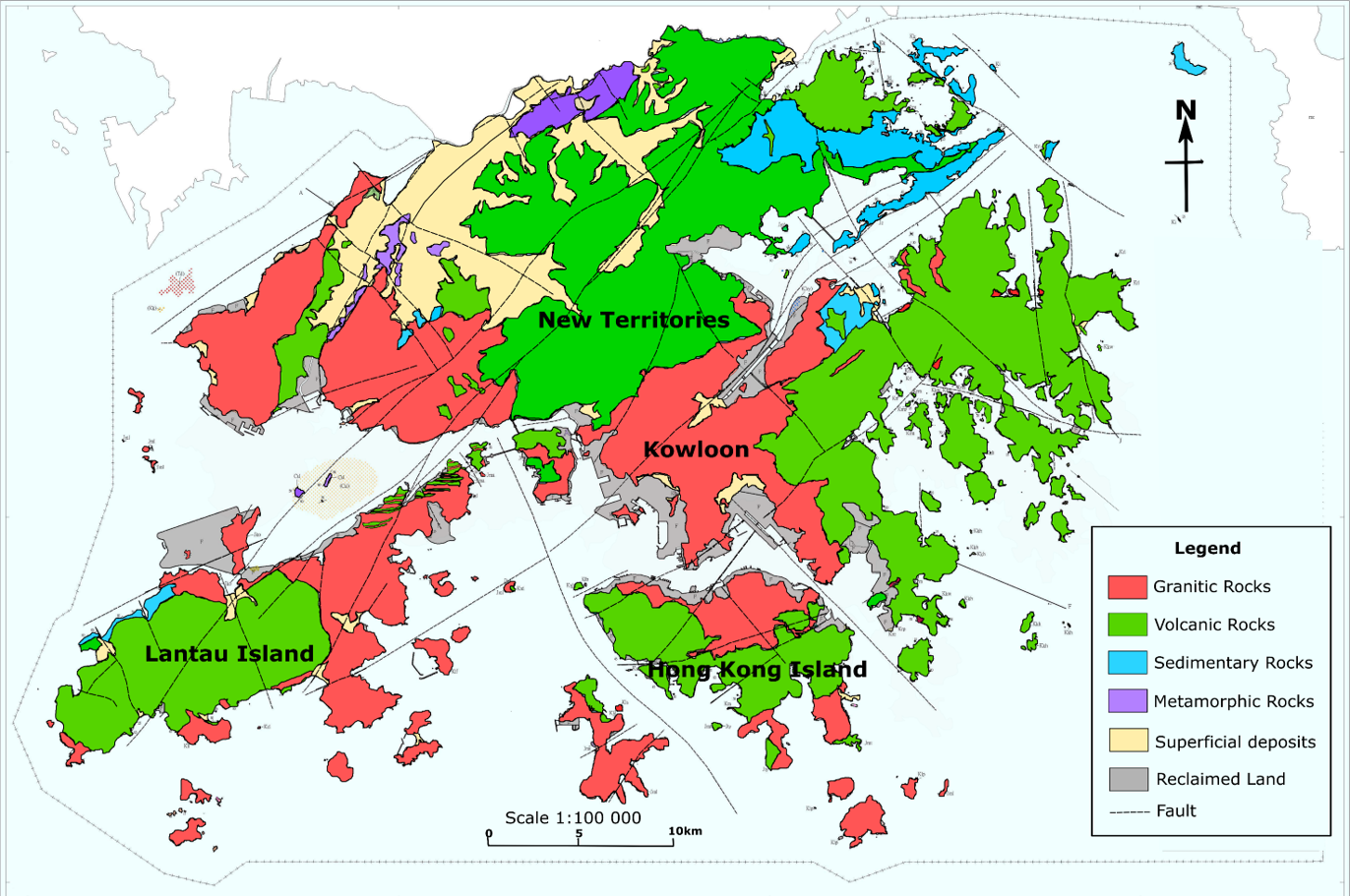
A Hong Kong Geographical Map showing the distribution of the types of rocks there. Grassy Hill is in green, which shows it consists of volcanic rocks.

Grassy Hill (Chinese: 草山; Cantonese Yale: Chóu sāan) is the fourteenth highest mountain in Hong Kong. Peaked at 647 m (2,123 ft), it is situated between Tsuen Wan and Tai Po and near Lead Mine Pass. Stage 7 of MacLehose Trail runs near its peak.

The summit of the hill is located near point of contact of Tai Po District, Tsuen Wan District and Sha Tin District. The summit itself is located within Tsuen Wan District.

== Geography ==
Grassy Hill has a cone-like shape. It forms the Shing Mun Reservoir catchment along with Needle Hill and Tai Mo Shan. Lead Mine Pass is in the western part of the hill.

== Geology ==
Grassy Hill consists of volcanic rocks (of which are mostly tuffs). These rocks are formed in the Late Jurassic Period at around 160 million years ago.

== See also ==
- List of mountains, peaks and hills in Hong Kong
- Lead Mine Pass
- Wong Chuk Yeung (Sha Tin District)
