= Chau Tau station =

Future MTR station in the New Territories, Hong Kong

Chau Tau 洲頭

General information
- Location: Lok Ma Chau; Yuen Long District
- Coordinates: 22°30′01″N 114°04′33″E
- System: Future MTR rapid transit station
- Owner: KCR Corporation
- Operator: MTR Corporation
- Line: Northern Link (expected 2034)
- Platforms: 2 (1 island platforms)
- Tracks: 2

Construction
- Structure type: Underground

Other information
- Station code: CHT

Services
| Preceding station | MTR | Following station |
Future service (2034)
| San Tin towards Kam Sheung Road | Northern Link | The Loop towards Huanggang Port |
Location
- Location within MTR

Chau Tau (Chinese: 洲頭; Jyutping: zau^{1} tau^{4}) is a future station in the Lok Ma Chau Spur Line. The station will be situated at Chau Tau, near Lok Ma Chau, near the border between Yuen Long and North District in the New Territories, Hong Kong.

Based on the map in the 2011 MTR Annual Report, the Northern Link is designed with two termini to the north, similar to the Tseung Kwan O line. These termini are expected to be at the existing Lok Ma Chau station and the proposed Kwu Tung station.
