= Ngau Tam Mei station =

Future MTR station in the New Territories, Hong Kong

Ngau Tam Mei 牛潭尾

General information
- Location: Ngau Tam Mei; Yuen Long District, Hong Kong
- Coordinates: 22.4754°N 114.0620°E
- System: Future MTR rapid transit station
- Owner: KCR Corporation
- Operator: MTR Corporation
- Line: Northern Link (expected 2034)
- Platforms: 2 (1 island platforms)
- Tracks: 2

Construction
- Structure type: Underground

Other information
- Station code: NTM

History
- Opening: Expected: 2034

Services
Preceding station	MTR	Following station
Au Tau towards Kam Sheung Road	Northern Link	San Tin towards Kwu Tung or Huanggang Port
Location
- Location within MTR

Ngau Tam Mei (Chinese: 牛潭尾) is a future station on the Northern Link of the MTR rapid transit network in Hong Kong. It was first proposed in the Railway Development Strategy by KCR in 2000. The station will be situated at Ngau Tam Mei, an undeveloped area located in Yuen Long District, New Territories.

There were originally no stations planned on the main section of the Northern Link, between Kam Sheung Road and Kwu Tung/Lok Ma Chau, but three stations, including Ngau Tam Mei, will be built on this section provided that significant development can be seen in the surrounding area.

== Station layout ==
There are 2 platforms and 4 exits in this station.

G	Concourse	Exits, MTR Shops, Customer Service
L1; Platforms	Platform 1	Northern Link towards Kwu Tung or Huanggang Port (San Tin) →
L1; Platforms	Island platform, doors will open on the left, right
L1; Platforms	Platform 2	← Northern Link towards Kam Sheung Road (Au Tau)

== Station vicinity ==
- Fairview Park
- Palm Springs
- The Vineyard
- Sam Wai Tsuen
- Chuk Yuen Tsuen
- Long Ha Tsuen
- Ngau Tam Mei Water Treatment Works
- Tam Mei Barracks Temple
