= Ngau Tam Mei =

Area in Yuen Long District, Hong Kong

Coordinates: 22°28.5′N 114°04′E

- Chinese: 牛潭尾
Transcriptions
Standard Mandarin
- Hanyu Pinyin: Niú Tán Wěi
Yue: Cantonese
- Jyutping: ngau4 taam4 mei5

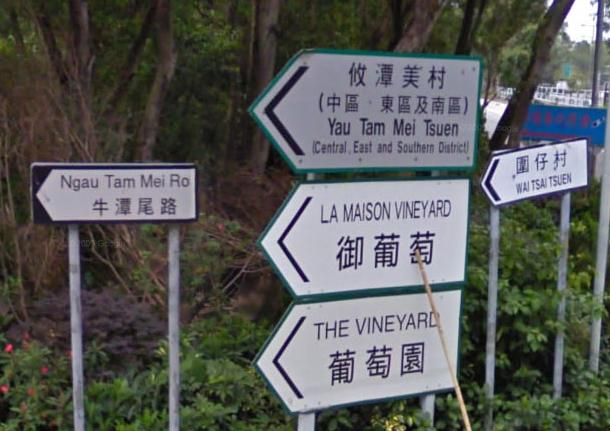
Ngau Tam Mei Road, a main road in Ngau Tam Mei

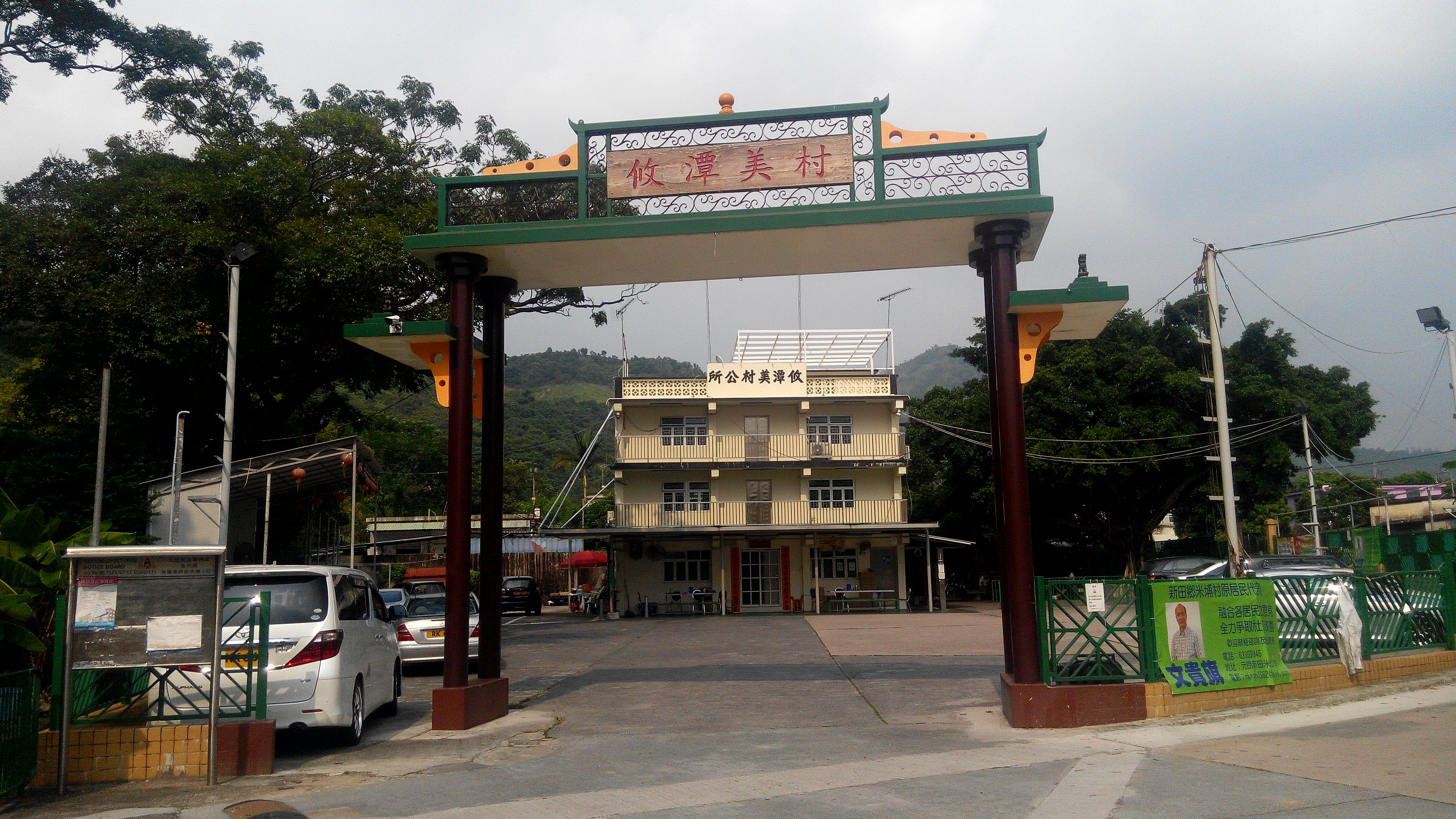
Yau Tam Mei village office

Ngau Tam Mei (Chinese: 牛潭尾; lit. 'Ox Pool End'), also known as Yau Tam Mei (攸潭尾), is a suburb located in San Tin, New Territories, Hong Kong near Yuen Long. It is located at the east of Fairview Park, the north of San Tin village and Kai Kung Leng, the northwest of Lam Tsuen Country Park, and also at the northeast of Nam Sang Wai.

The village lies within an area designated under the Northern Metropolis plan announced by Chief Executive John Lee in his third Policy Address. The plan includes Hong Kong’s third medical school, a university town, and a residential hub covering a total area of 127 hectares. The project has already begun to disrupt traditional ways of life in this part of the northern New Territories.

== Features ==
Wat Buddhadhamaram (วัดพุทธธรรมาราม) (泰國佛堂), the oldest Thai temple in Hong Kong, is located in Ngau Tam Mei.

== Traffic ==
Since there is no MTR stations in Ngau Tam Mei, people living in Ngau Tam Mei mainly travel on minibuses, buses and also on bicycle. There are three main roads in Ngau Tam Mei, which are: Ngau Tam Mei Road, San Tin Highway and Castle Peak Road. Moreover, a proposed railway station, namely Ngau Tam Mei station, may be built in Ngau Tam Mei in the future to serve the local residents.

== Education ==
Yau Tam Mei is in Primary One Admission (POA) School Net 74. Within the school net are multiple aided schools (operated independently but funded with government money) and one government school: Yuen Long Government Primary School (元朗官立小學).

== Future developments ==
=== Railway ===
The Guangzhou–Shenzhen–Hong Kong Express Rail Link Hong Kong section which is currently under construction will pass through Ngau Tam Mei. In addition, a Ngau Tam Mei station is also proposed as an intermediate station of the MTR Northern Link provided that significant development can be seen in the surrounding areas.

== See also ==
- Wai Tsai Tsuen, a village located in the Ngau Tam Mei area
