= San Tin station =

Future MTR station in the New Territories, Hong Kong

San Tin 新田

General information
- Location: San Tin; Yuen Long District, Hong Kong
- Coordinates: 22°29′15″N 114°04′20″E
- System: Future MTR rapid transit station
- Owner: KCR Corporation
- Operator: MTR Corporation
- Line: Northern Link (expected 2034)
- Platforms: 2 (1 island platforms)
- Tracks: 2

Construction
- Structure type: Underground

Other information
- Station code: SAT

History
- Opening: Expected: 2034

Services
Preceding station	MTR	Following station
Ngau Tam Mei towards Kam Sheung Road	Northern Link	Kwu Tung Terminus
Ngau Tam Mei towards Kam Sheung Road	Northern Link	Chau Tau towards Huanggang Port
Location
- Location within MTR

San Tin (Chinese: 新田; Jyutping: san^{1} tin^{4}) is a future station on the Northern Link of the MTR in Hong Kong. The station will be situated at San Tin, an undeveloped area located in Yuen Long District, New Territories.

There were originally no stations planned on the main section of the Northern Link, between Kam Sheung Road and Kwu Tung/Lok Ma Chau, but three stations, including San Tin, will be built on this section provided that significant development can be seen in the surrounding area. As of 2012, there are still no construction plans for the station, although the Yuen Long District Council has pressed the government to construct the station "as soon as possible".

In 2025, the Hong Kong government authorised the Northern Link development plans, which will see the line and the accompanying stations, including San Tin station be built by 2034.

== Station vicinity ==
- Tai Fu Tai Mansion
