= Au Tau station =

Future MTR station in the New Territories, Hong Kong

Au Tau 凹頭

General information
- Location: Au Tau; Yuen Long District, Hong Kong
- Coordinates: 22.4573°N 114.0533°E
- System: Future MTR rapid transit station
- Owner: KCR Corporation
- Operator: MTR Corporation
- Line: Northern Link (expected 2034)
- Platforms: 2 (1 island platforms)
- Tracks: 2

Construction
- Structure type: Underground

Other information
- Station code: NTM

History
- Opening: Expected: 2034

Services
Preceding station	MTR	Following station
Kam Sheung Road Terminus	Northern Link	Ngau Tam Mei towards Kwu Tung or Huanggang Port
Location
- Location within MTR

Au Tau (Chinese: 凹頭) is a future station on the Northern Link of the MTR rapid transit network in Hong Kong. The station will be situated at Au Tau, an undeveloped area located in Yuen Long District, New Territories.

There were originally no stations planned on the main section of the Northern Link, between Kam Sheung Road and Kwu Tung/Lok Ma Chau, but three stations, including Au Tau, will be built on this section provided that significant development can be seen in the surrounding area.

== Station Layout ==
There are 2 platform and 4 exits.

G	Concourse	Exits, MTR Shops, Customer Service, Transportation Interchange
L1; Platforms	Platform 1	Northern Link towards Kwu Tung or Huanggang Port (Ngau Tam Mei) →
L1; Platforms	Island platform, doors will open on the left, right
L1; Platforms	Platform 2	← Northern Link towards Kam Sheung Road (Terminus)

== Station vicinity ==
- Pok Oi Hospital
