= The Loop station =

Future MTR station in the New Territories, Hong Kong

The Loop 河套

General information
- Location: Lok Ma Chau Loop; Yuen Long District, Hong Kong (suggested)
- System: Future MTR rapid transit station
- Owner: KCR Corporation
- Operator: MTR Corporation
- Line: Northern Link (expected 2034)
- Platforms: 2 (1 island platforms)
- Tracks: 2

Construction
- Structure type: Underground

Other information
- Station code: THL

Services
Preceding station	MTR	Following station
Future service (2034)
Chau Tau towards Kam Sheung Road	Northern Link	Huanggang Port Terminus

The Loop (河套; ho^{4} tou^{3}) is an MTR station currently under planning on the Northern Link. The station is situated at Lok Ma Chau Loop, a future Hong Kong-Shenzhen Innovation and Technology Park near Lok Ma Chau.

== History ==
In 2025, the Hong Kong government authorised the Northern Link development plans, which will see the line and the accompanying stations, including The Loop station be built by 2034.
