= Au Tau =

Area of Yuen Long, Hong Kong

Coordinates: 22°26′23.2″N 114°2′45.67″E

- Traditional Chinese: 凹頭
- Simplified Chinese: 凹头
Transcriptions
Standard Mandarin
- Hanyu Pinyin: Āotóu
Yue: Cantonese
- Yale Romanization: Āau tàuh
- Jyutping: Aau1 tau4
- Sidney Lau: Aau^{1} Tau^{4}

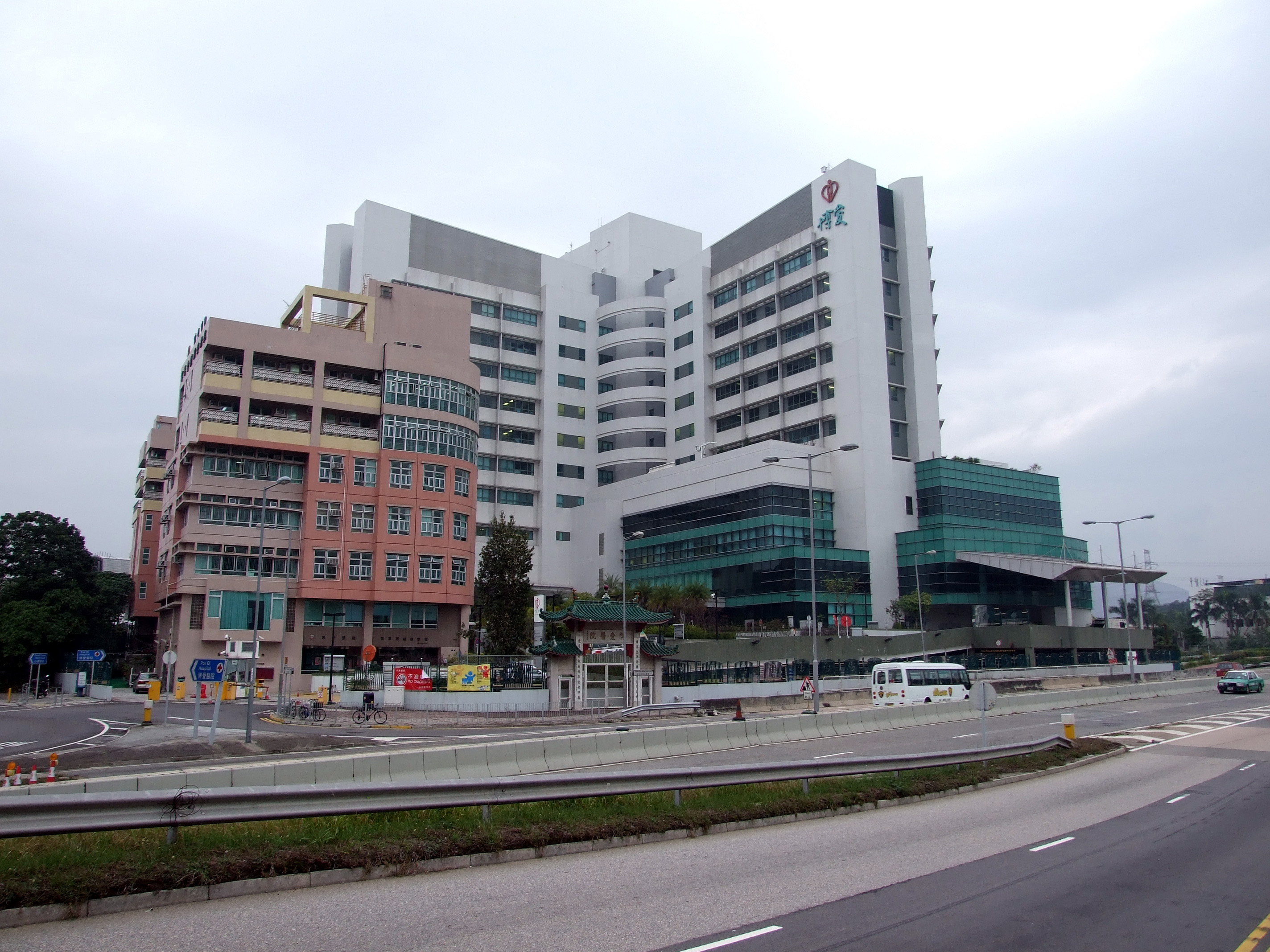
Pok Oi Hospital, a hospital located at Au Tau

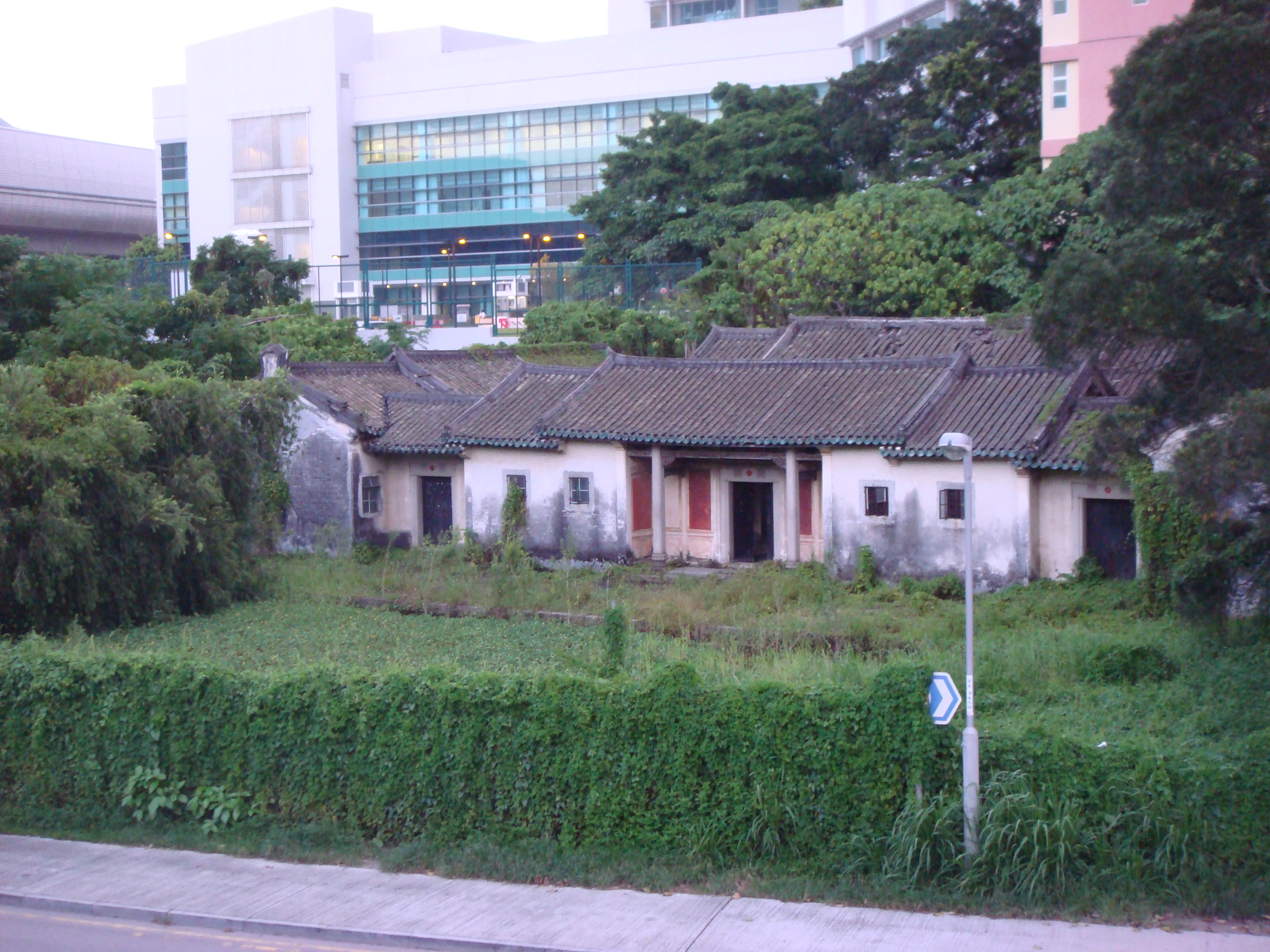
Pun Uk

Au Tau (Chinese: 凹頭) is an area of Yuen Long District, Hong Kong, located directly east of Yuen Long Town.

Pok Oi Hospital is located in Au Tau.

Pun Uk, a former mansion and a Grade I Historic Building is located in Au Tau, next to the hospital.

Tung Shing Lei (東成里) is a village located in Au Tau.

== Administration ==
For electoral purposes, Au Tau is located in the Shap Pat Heung East constituency of the Yuen Long District Council. It was formerly represented by Lee Chun-wai, who was elected in the 2019 elections until July 2021.

== Transportation ==
Castle Peak Road passes through the northern part of Au Tau.

Au Tau station is proposed as being an intermediate station of the MTR Northern Link.

== Education ==
Au Tau is in Primary One Admission (POA) School Net 74. Within the school net are multiple aided schools (operated independently but funded with government money) and one government school: Yuen Long Government Primary School (元朗官立小學).
