= Chau Tau =

Village of Hong Kong

Coordinates: 22.506309°N 114.083760°E

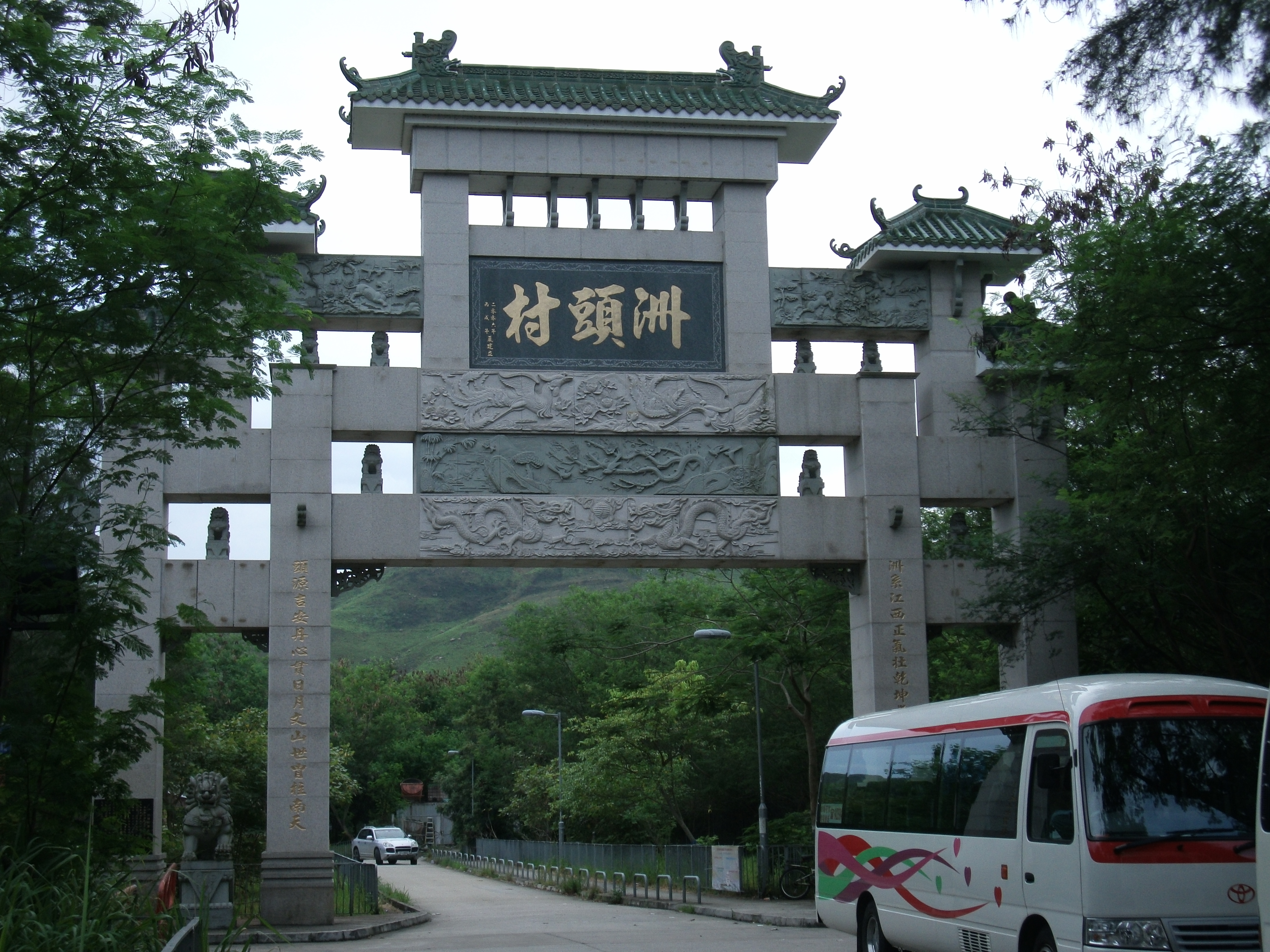
Paifang of Chau Tau village.

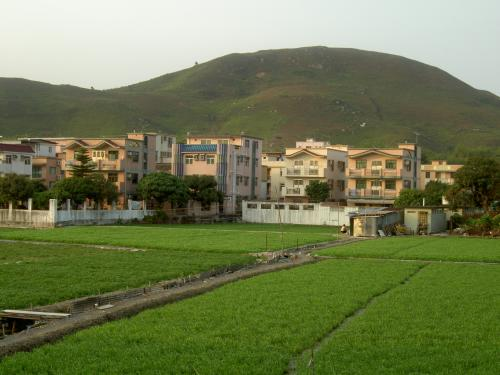
Chau Tau with Tit Hang Shan (鐵坑山) in the background.

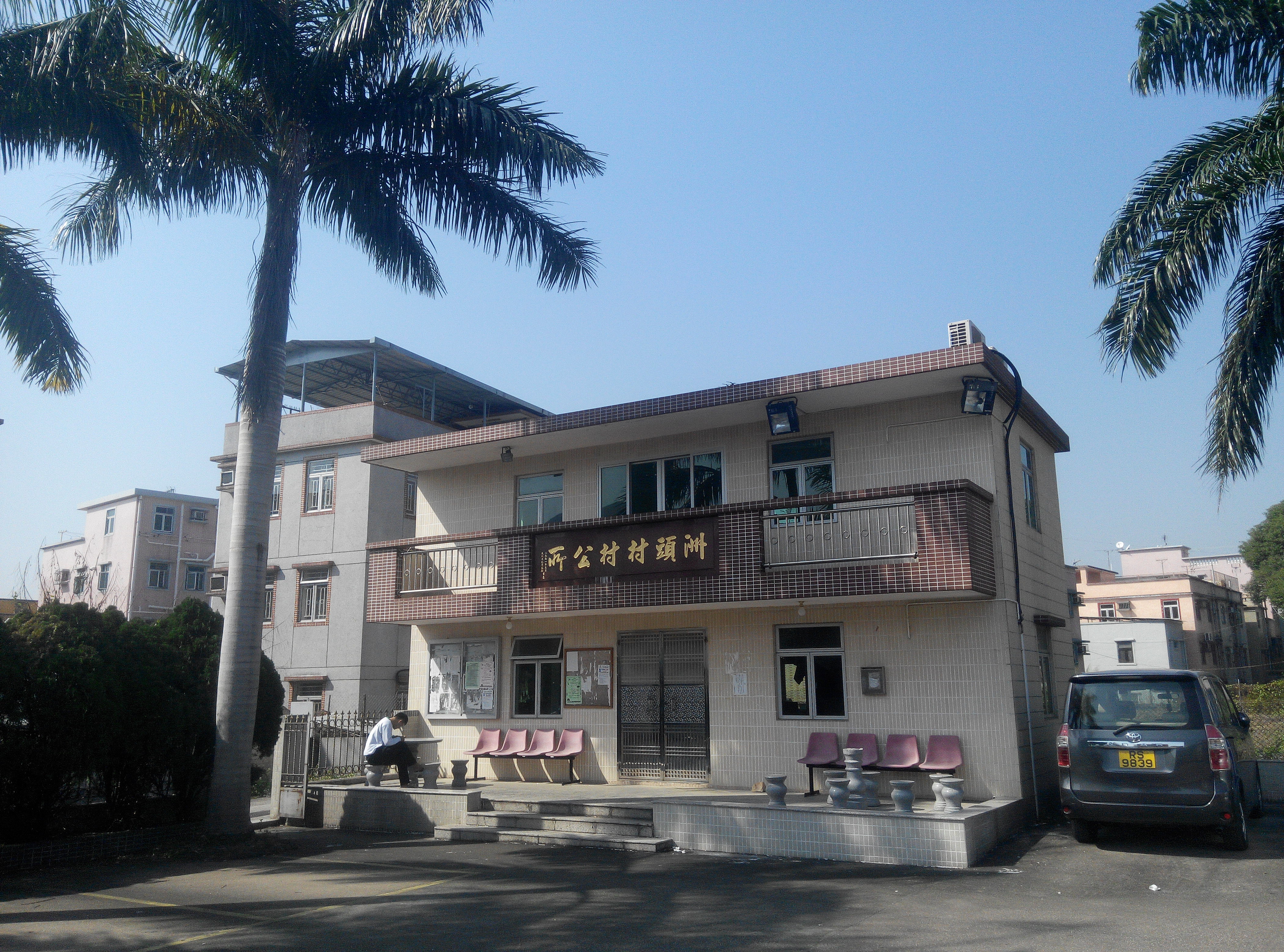
Chau Tau Rural Committee office.

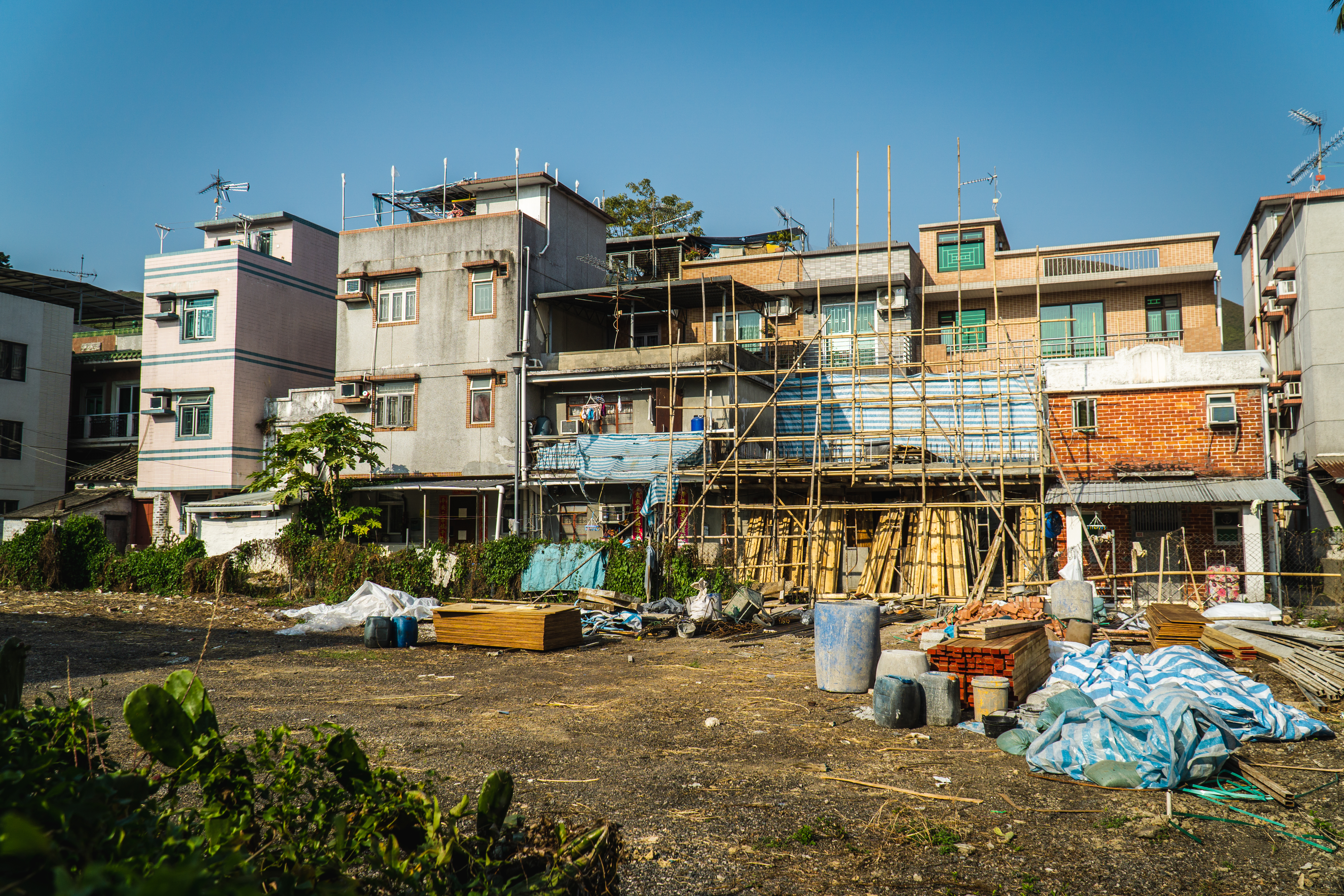
New construction of houses.

Chau Tau (Chinese: 洲頭) is a village in the New Territories of Hong Kong, in the San Tin area of Yuen Long District. There is a new railway called the Lok Ma Chau Spur Line linking it to mainland China. It is near Lok Ma Chau.

Its settlements are largely of the Man (文) clan.

== Administration ==
Chau Tau is a recognized village under the New Territories Small House Policy.

== Geography ==
Chau Tau Tsuen is located in San Tin Area of the Yuen Long District (New Territories) and it is closely near to Lok Ma Chau (A map and the transportation method is attached below). Chau Tau Tsuen is a big and old village which has more than 1000 villagers and only around 300 villagers who are always live in there. The uniqueness about the village is that in Chau Tau Tsuen, villagers are mainly from the Man clan which is one of the Five Great Clans in New Territories and its history is long as one thousand years.

As Chau Tau Tsuen has been built up for over a thousand of year, it is full of historical values and worth discovering more about it. In the village, the vestige of the old days is left. For example, the old and historical ancestral hall, some historical old buildings and old-style cooking utensils are still well-preserved. Also, there are some farmlands and the agricultural activities still practices since some villagers there depends farming for a living. Apart from the historical buildings, Sau Fan, a traditional village snack, is preserved by the Chau Tau Tsuen villagers as a unique and special cultural heritage of the village and has successfully approved as the Intangible Cultural Heritage in Hong Kong.

== Recent changes ==
There are many new constructions of new houses and roads. The new houses have been built with modern design and up to height of fourth floors. Some of the original residents have sold their houses to the property developers and other people who are not residents, to live in the village. The population of this village is decreasing, some of the younger generation have moved to the urban areas. In the past, all of the residents' surname are 'Man'. However, in the present, there are more people with different clans living in Chau Tau Tsuen.

In Chau Tau Tsuen, the size and number of farmlands are reducing. Due to economic development and urbanization, some of the agricultural areas have been used for other uses, such as residential and commercial areas. Since there are fewer young people are willing to be farmers, there are less farmers than before.

== Tradition ==
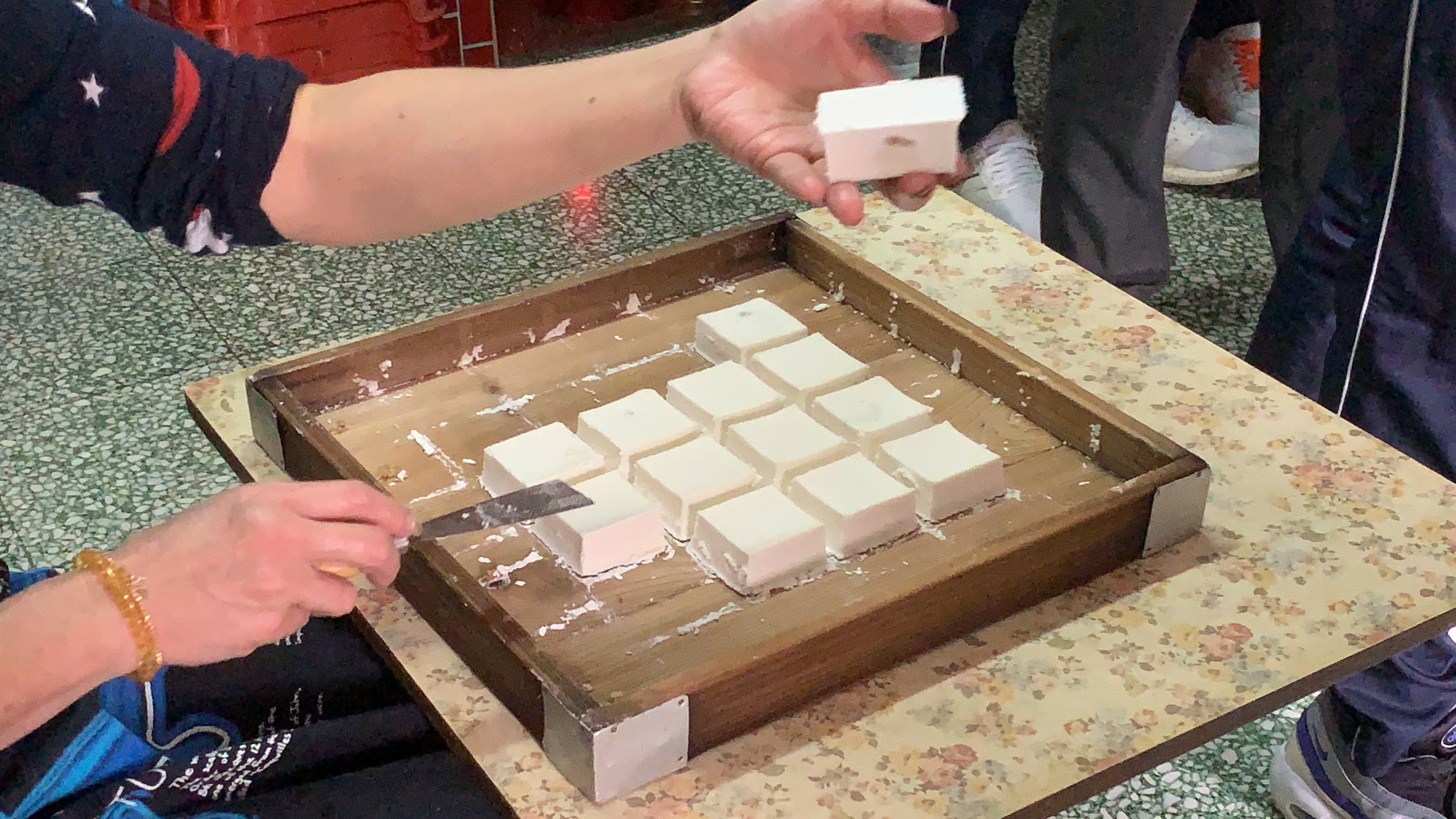
Sau Fan

Sau Fan, a traditional village snack, is preserved by the Chau Tau Tsuen villagers as a unique and special cultural heritage of the village and has successfully approved as the “Intangible Cultural Heritage” in Hong Kong. The number of villagers who know how to make Sau Fan, is decreasing. Ms Wong, a villager of Chau Tau Tsuen, she would organize a teaching class of Sau Fan. She would introduce the background of Sau Fan and other different kinds of traditional snacks. Participants can actively join in the making process of Sau Fan.

The making process of Sau Fan is as follows. The first step is that preparing rice flour, glutinous rice flour, water, sugar and chopped peanut. Secondly, mix rice flour, glutinous rice flour with certain amount of water in the ratio of 1:1:1. Thirdly, use the strainer to sift the mixed flour before putting into the prepared mold. Then, cover one-third of the mold with the flour. Fourthly, fry the peanut and add appropriate amount of sugar and mix them. Put 2 teaspoon serving of peanut on top of the flour in the prepared mold. Fifthly, sift the rest of the flour into the mold with a strainer to cover the peanut filling. Then, use a spoon to flatten the surface of the flour and place a baking paper on the top of the mold. Finally, steam it for 20 minutes in a traditional big steamer. Then, take away the mold and steam Sau Fan for 10 minutes more. The yummy Sau Fan can be enjoyed by you.

== Transportation ==
The most convenient way to go Chau Tau Tsuen is that firstly take the train to Sheung Shui station. Then, take the no. 76K / 276B bus and get off at San Tin Public Transport Interchange and walk along Castle Peak Road (Chau Tau). It will take around 7 minutes to arrive at the Chau Tau Tsuen Archway.

== See also ==
- Chau Tau station (a proposed station)
