= Wai Tsai =

Coordinates: 22.480341°N 114.061414°E

Wai Tsai (Chinese: 圍仔) or Wai Tsai Tsuen (圍仔村; 'Wai Tsai Village') is a village in the Ngau Tam Mei, San Tin area of Yuen Long District, Hong Kong.

== Administration ==
Wai Tsai is a recognized village under the New Territories Small House Policy.
