= Tai Sang Wai =

Area and village of Hong Kong

Coordinates: 22.470873°N 114.043201°E

Tai Sang Wai (Chinese: 大生圍), sometimes transliterated as Tai Shang Wai, is an area and a village in the San Tin area of Yuen Long District, Hong Kong.

== History ==
The development of Fairview Park on fish farming land at Tai Shang Wai was a source of controversy at the time of its planning and construction in the mid-1970s. Concerns included ecological aspects, due to its proximity to marshland bordering Deep Bay, and the transport implications, with the majority of the inhabitants expected to work in the Victoria Harbour area.

== Education ==
Tai Sang Wai is in Primary One Admission (POA) School Net 74. Within the school net are multiple aided schools (operated independently but funded with government money) and one government school: Yuen Long Government Primary School (元朗官立小學).
