= Lok Ma Chau Spur Line =

Railway line in Hong Kong

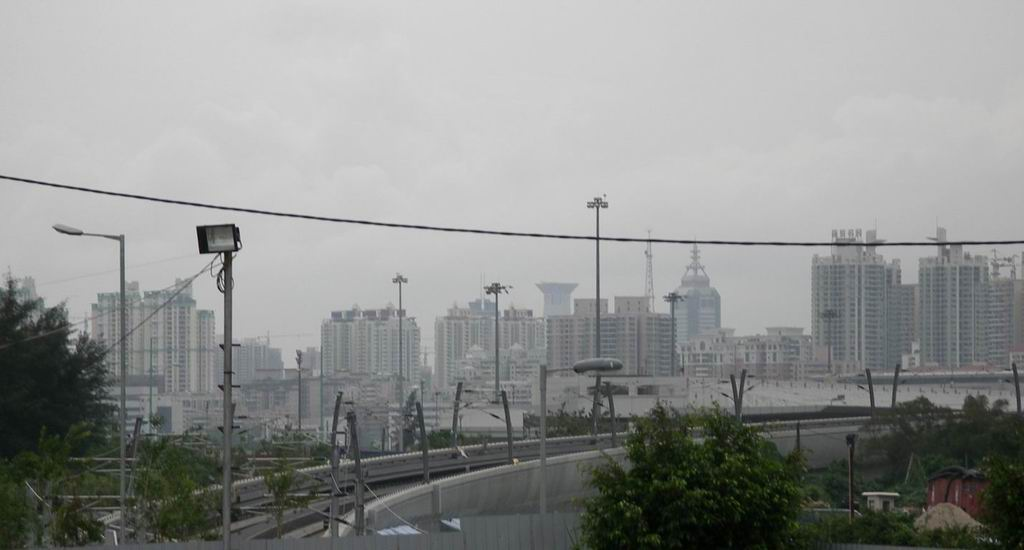
Elevated section

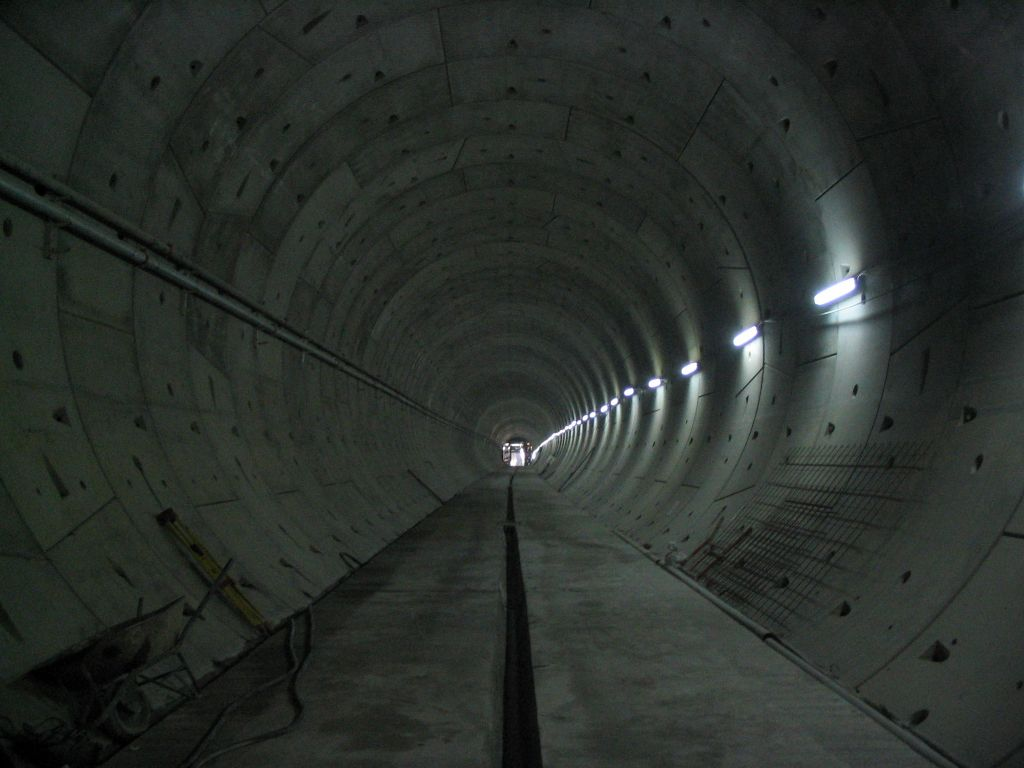
Inside the tunnel towards Lok Ma Chau station during construction

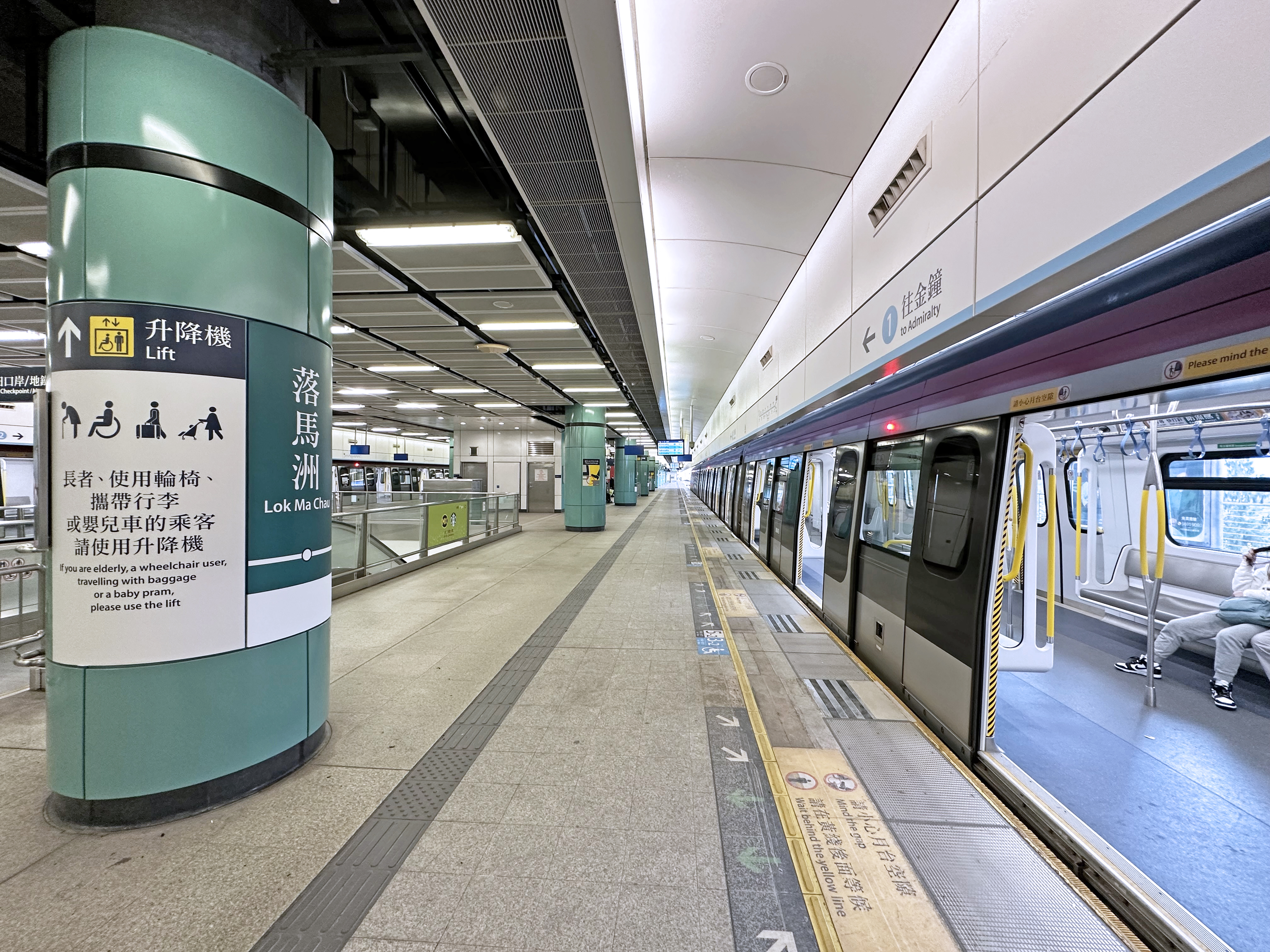
Lok Ma Chau station

The Lok Ma Chau Spur Line is the second railway link between Hong Kong and mainland China, relieving passenger congestion at Lo Wu station. The 7.4 km (4.6 mi) alignment branches off the existing MTR East Rail line north of Sheung Shui station and then runs to the Lok Ma Chau station where customs and immigration facilities are provided. The terminus is connected to Futian Checkpoint station (formerly named as Huanggang station) of the Shenzhen Metro Line 4 by a pedestrian bridge across the Shenzhen River.

The KCRC has adopted a combined tunnel and viaduct scheme for the spur line. From Sheung Shui to Chau Tau, the railway runs through tunnels, the railway then runs on viaducts until it reaches Lok Ma Chau station.

The Spur Line project comprises four major sections, namely, the tunnels, the viaducts, Lok Ma Chau station, and the modification works at the existing Sheung Shui station. Unlike the rest of the East Rail line, which is above ground, this section is located underground.

The Government of the Hong Kong Special Administrative Region endorsed the corporation's construction of the Lok Ma Chau Spur Line on 14 June 2002. Construction commenced in January 2003. The line was officially opened on 15 August 2007, in ceremonies led by Henry Tang, the Chief Secretary for Administration of Hong Kong.

The station is reached by foot from Shenzhen (the mainland side), or by MTR train, bus, mini-bus, or taxi from the Hong Kong side. Private cars, bicycles, and walking through the restricted frontier zone to other parts of Hong Kong according to an official at the Hong Kong border are not allowed. The station is in a restricted area where no stores or other businesses except MTR tenants (such as 7-Eleven) are allowed.

== Kwu Tung station ==
Kwu Tung station is a planned infill station along the Lok Ma Chau spur line that will serve the East Rail line when it is opened in 2027. The station box structure was first constructed as part of the Lok Ma Chau spur line but was never completed.

It is currently part of the first phase of the Northern Link project. It will also serve as the Northern Link's terminus when the line opens in 2034.

== Key statistics ==
- Length: 7.4 km (4.6 mi)
- Journey time: 8 minutes
- Train frequency: 5-6 trains per hour (every 10–12 minutes) running from Admiralty station to Lok Ma Chau station.

== See also ==
- Transport in Hong Kong
- Rail transport in Hong Kong
- MTR
- East Rail line
- Lok Ma Chau
- Lok Ma Chau Control Point
