= Northern Link (MTR) =

Proposed Hong Kong MTR railway line

Northern Link 北環綫

Overview
- Status: Phase 1: Under construction; Phase 2: Under construction; Spur Line: Under construction
- Owner: Kowloon-Canton Railway Corporation
- Locale: Districts: Yuen Long, North, Futian
- Termini: Kwu Tung / Huanggang Port; Kam Sheung Road
- Connecting lines: East Rail line Via Kwu Tung; Tuen Ma line Via Kam Sheung Road; Shenzhen Metro: ■ Line 7 ■ Line 9 ■ Line 20
- Stations: 8

Service
- Type: Commuter rail / Rapid transit
- System: MTR
- Operator: MTR Corporation
- Depot: Ngau Tam Mei Depot

History
- Planned opening: Phase 1: 2027 (Kwu Tung station); Phase 2: 2034; Spur Line: opens in 2034 with Phase 2

Technical
- Line length: 16.9 km (10.5 mi)
- Track gauge: 1,435 mm (4 ft 8 1/2 in) standard gauge

Northern Link
- Traditional Chinese: 北環綫
- Simplified Chinese: 北环线
Transcriptions
Standard Mandarin
- Hanyu Pinyin: Běi Huán Xiàn
Yue: Cantonese
- Jyutping: bak1 waan4 sin3

The Northern Link is a future commuter rail / rapid transit line of the MTR system of Hong Kong which would connect the Tuen Ma line and the Lok Ma Chau Spur Line of the East Rail line. The link would also serve as a connection to the border checkpoint to mainland China for passengers to and from the western New Territories. The Northern Link would start at Kam Sheung Road and end at Kwu Tung or Huanggang Port, with 5 intermediate stations.

Other benefits for constructing this project are significantly shorter journey times for certain trips (for example, the Yuen Long to Fanling route would be reduced in length from 20 stations, running through Kowloon to 5 stations), significantly reducing costs for these trips, as well as relieving the large number of passengers using the East Rail line by diverting some passengers to the Tuen Ma line.

== History ==
According to the Railway Development Strategy 2014, a shuttle service between Kam Sheung Road station and Kwu Tung station spanning 10.7 km (6.6 mi) was expected to begin construction in 2018 and be inaugurated in 2023.

The initial line is expected to cost HK$62 billion in December 2015 prices, with an average of HK$500 million/km.

== Phases ==
The Northern Link (NOL) project is expected to consist of four phases.

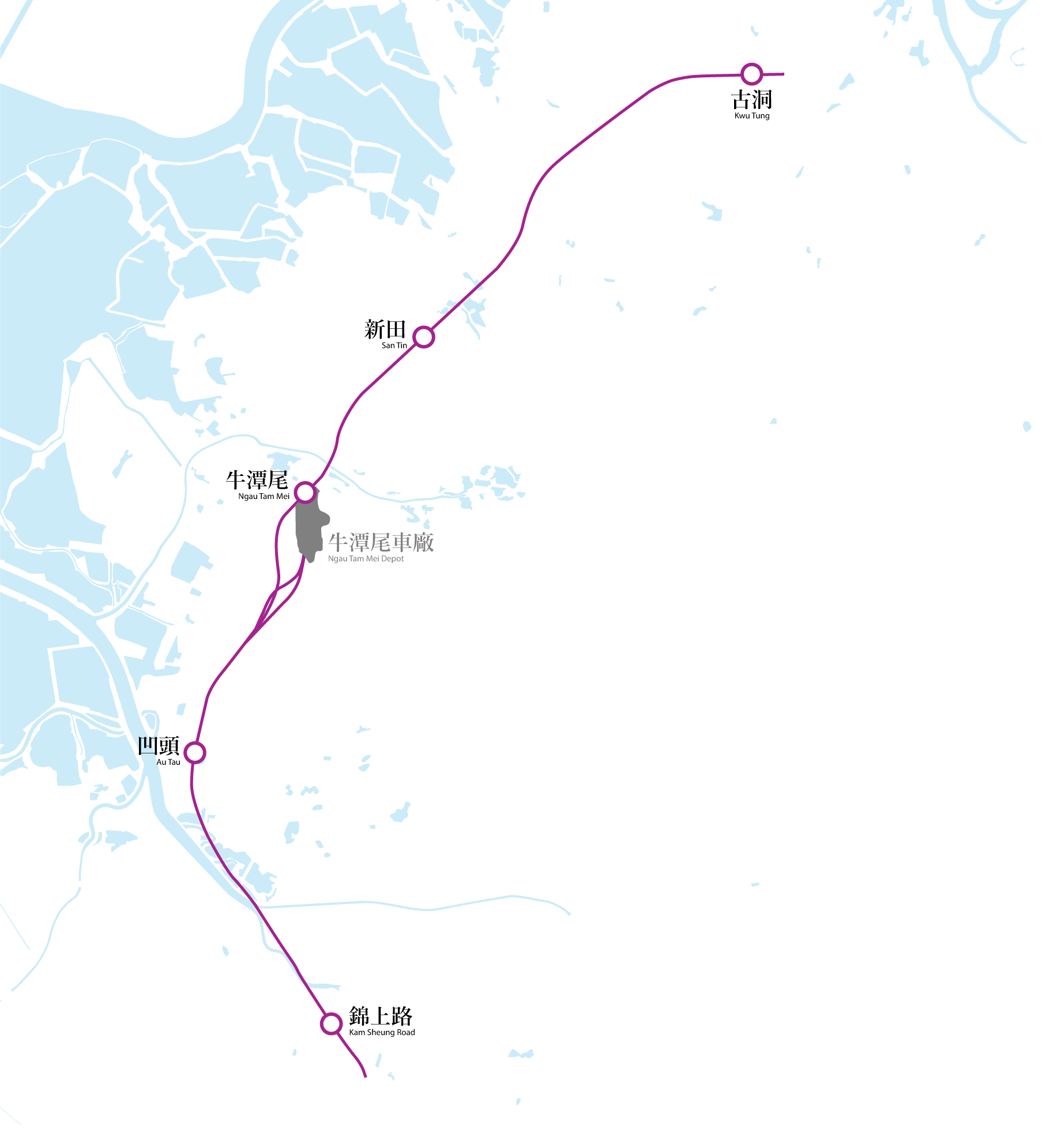
Map of Phase 2 of the Northern Link

=== Phase 1 ===
Phase 1 consists of the construction and completion of Kwu Tung station that will initially serve the East Rail line after its opening, then later the Northern Link after the completion of Phase 2. It had been partially built by KCR Corporation during the construction of the Lok Ma Chau Spur Line. Construction of Kwu Tung station was approved by the government in 2022, started construction in September 29, 2023, with completion due in 2027.

The station was expected to cost HK$3.5 billion as of December 2015. As of July 2023, the estimated cost had risen to HK$5.9 billion.

=== Phase 2 ===
Phase 2 consists of the building of the 10.7 km main line from Kam Sheung Road station to Kwu Tung station. It also includes the construction of 3 new stations (Au Tau, Ngau Tam Mei and San Tin) along with the expansion of Kam Sheung Road station to accommodate the new tracks and platforms. Planning and designing began in 2021. Construction of the mainline has begun in November 3rd, 2025 and is expected to be completed in 2034.

It is expected to cost HK$58.5 billion in December 2015 prices.

=== Northern Link Spur Line ===
The 5.8 km Northern Link Spur Line starts from San Tin station and connects to San Tin Technopole, Hong Kong-Shenzhen Innovation and Technology Park (station name is not confirmed) before terminating at the Huanggang Port in Shenzhen. Construction of the Spur Line has begun in November 3rd, 2025 and is expected to be completed in 2034.

=== Northern Link Eastern Extension ===
The 9.5 km eastern extension extends eastward from Kwu Tung to Ping Che via Lo Wu South and Man Kam To. Originally planned as part of the extension, the section from Heung Yuen Wai to Fanling station will form the new 8.5 km Northeast New Territories Line.

== Stations ==
Livery	Station Name		Interchange; Adjacent transportation	Opening	District
Livery	English	Chinese	Interchange; Adjacent transportation	Opening	District
Phase 1 (Under construction)
	Kwu Tung	古洞	East Rail line	2027	North
Phase 2 (Under construction)
	Kam Sheung Road	錦上路	Tuen Ma line	20 December 2003	Yuen Long
	Au Tau	凹頭	—	2034	Yuen Long
	Ngau Tam Mei	牛潭尾	—	2034	Yuen Long
	San Tin	新田	—	2034	Yuen Long
Northern Link Spur Line (Under construction)
	San Tin	新田	—	2034	Yuen Long
	Chau Tau	洲頭	—	2034	Yuen Long
	The Loop	河套	—	2034	TBA
	Huanggang Port	皇崗口岸	Through Border Checkpoint: Huanggang Checkpoint: 7 20	2034	Futian
Eastern Extension
	Lo Wu South	羅湖南	East Rail line	TBA	North
	Man Kam To	文錦渡	Through Border Checkpoint: Wenjin: 9	TBA	North
	Hung Lung Hang	恐龍坑	—	TBA	North
	Ping Che	坪輋	—	TBA	North
