= Fairview Park (Hong Kong) =

Housing estate in Hong Kong

Coordinates: 22.4774°N 114.0452°E

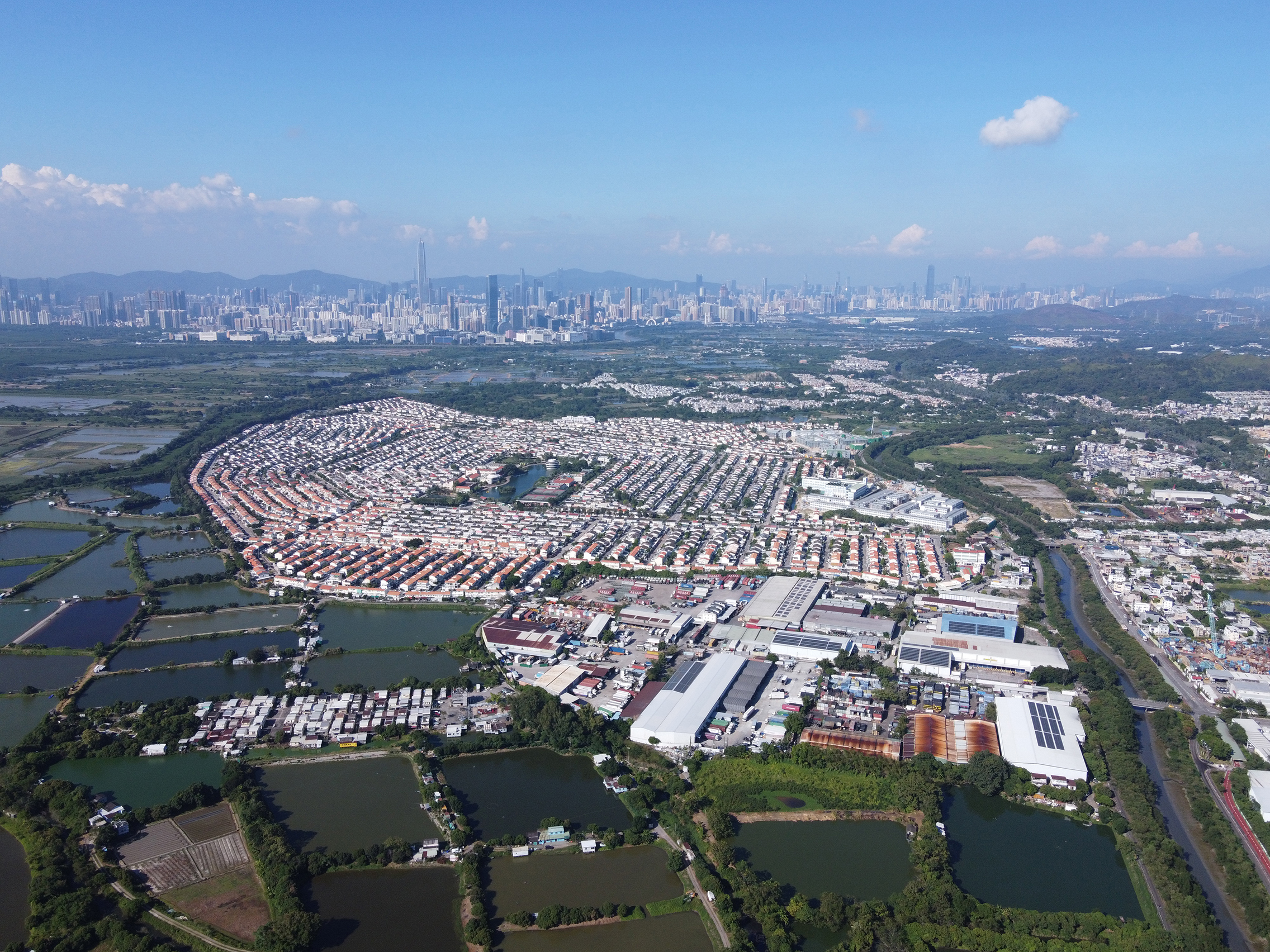
Aerial view of Fairview Park

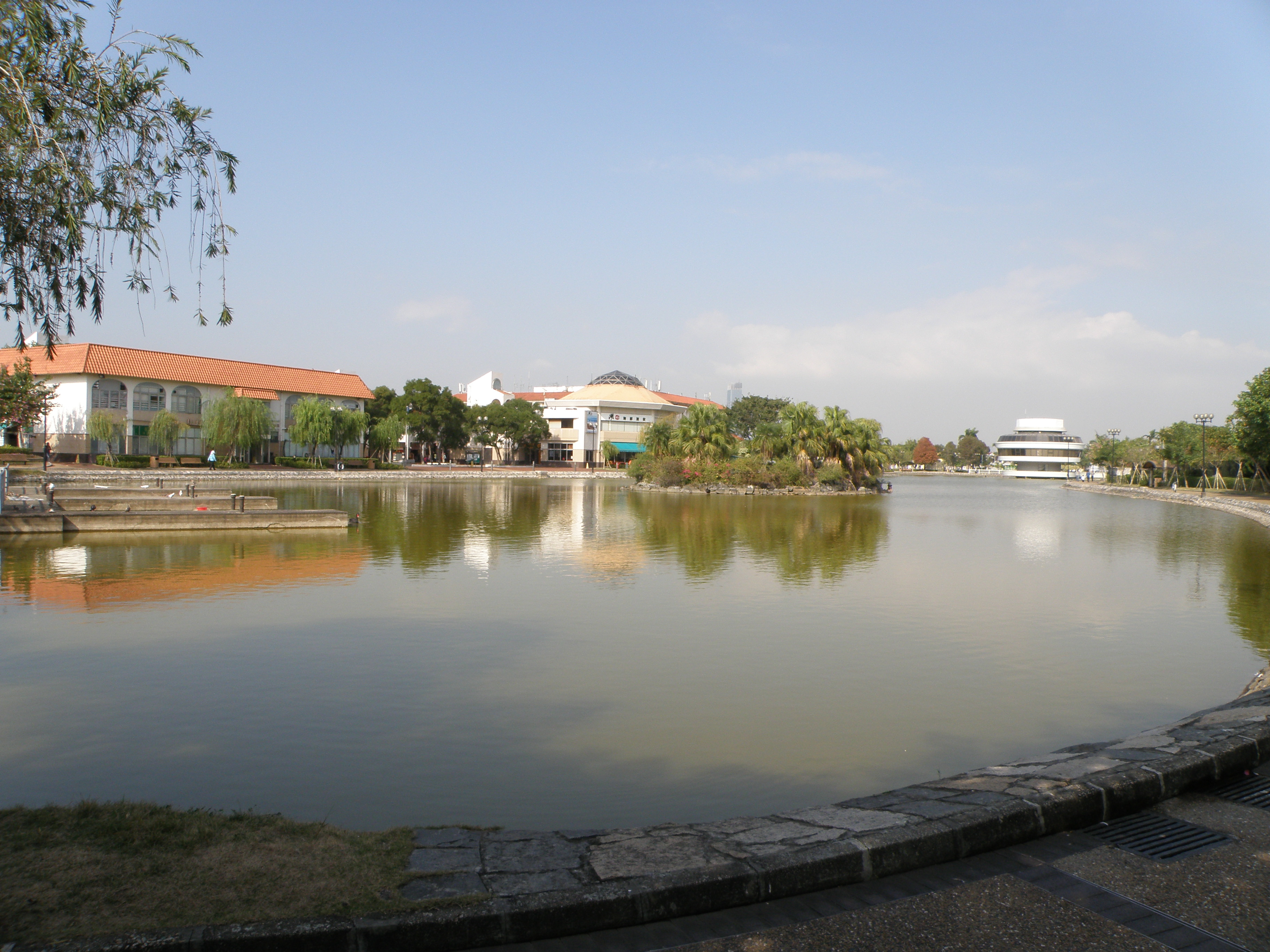
Artificial lake in Fairview Park

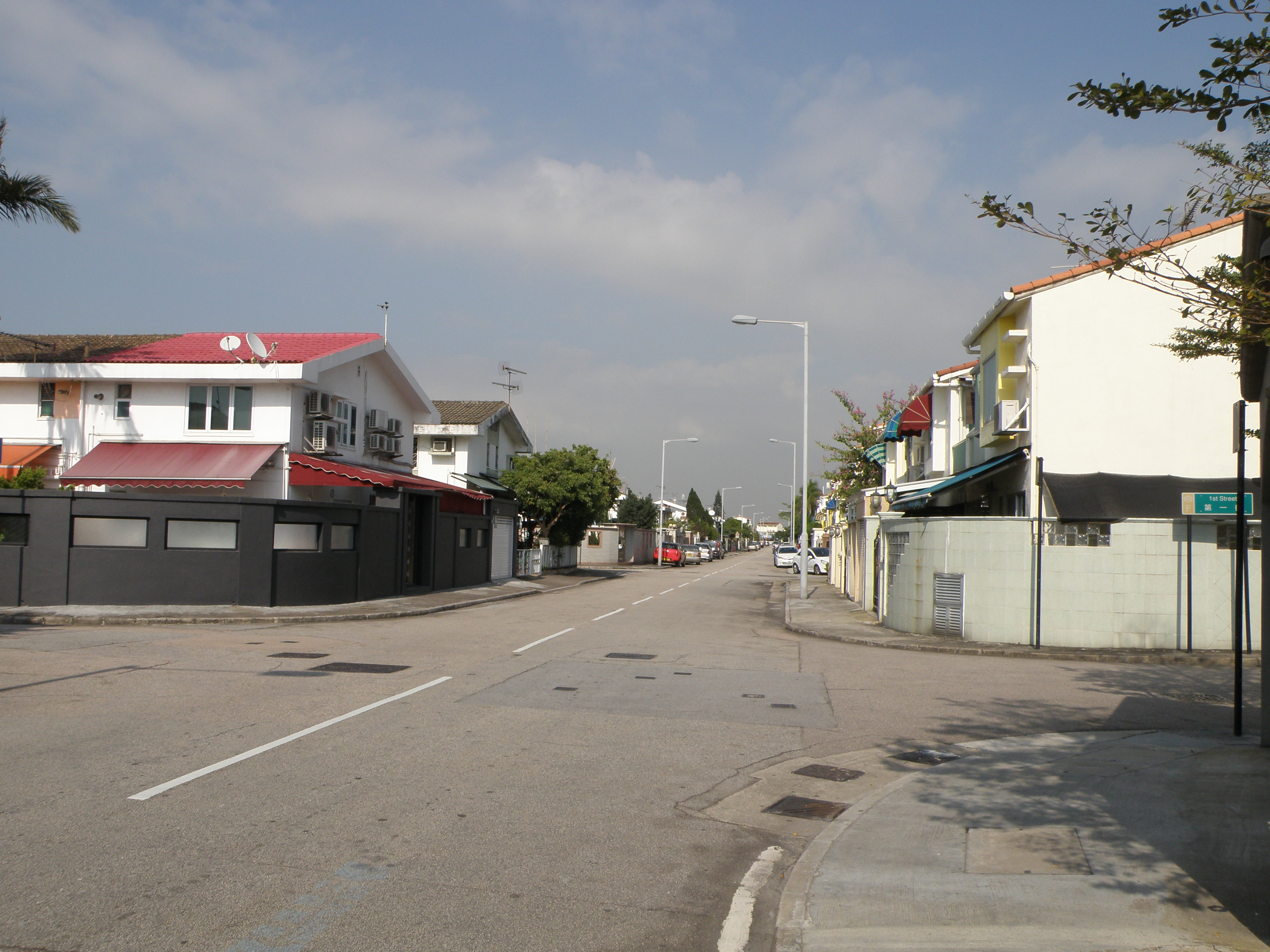
Fairview Park houses

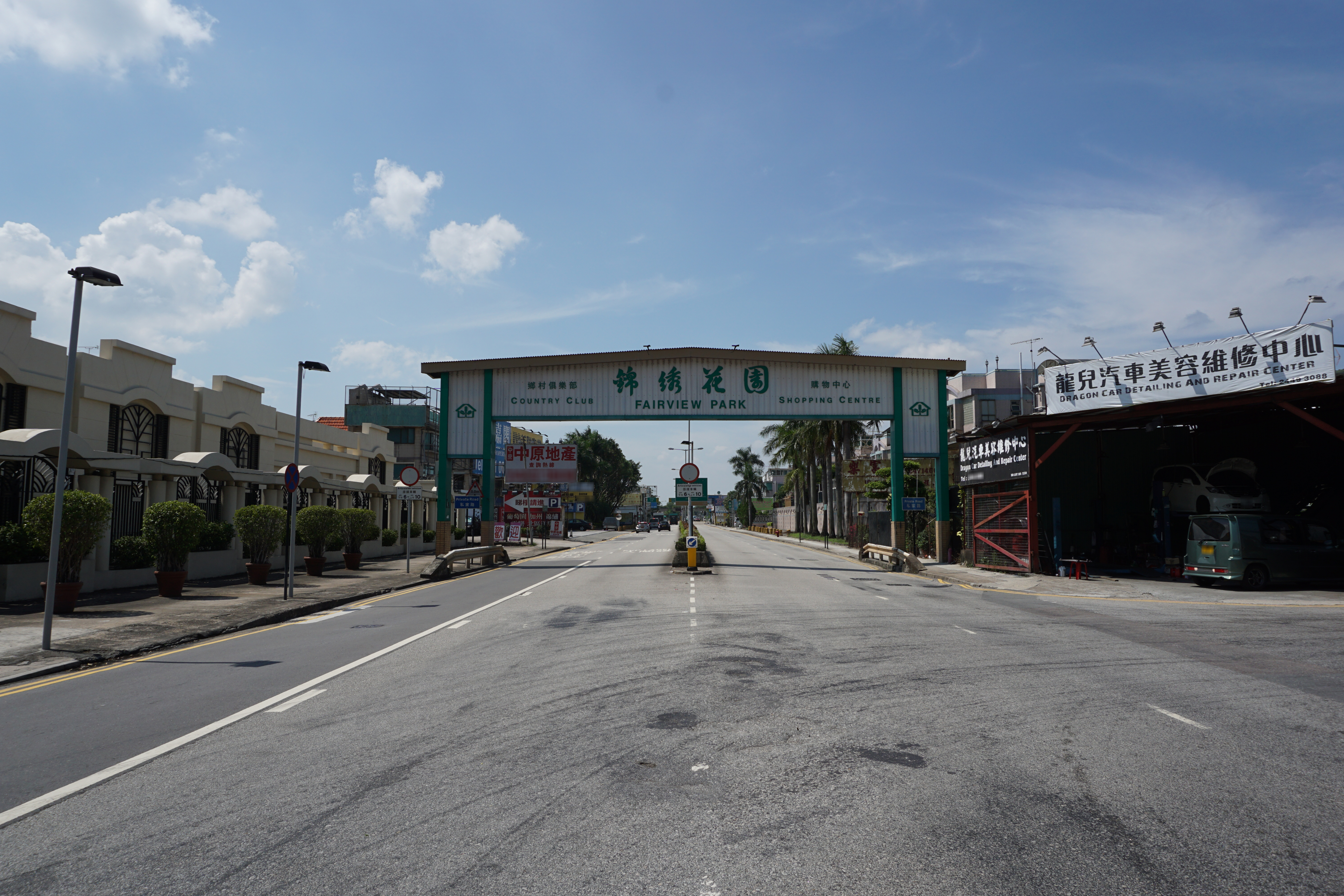
Fairview Park Entrance

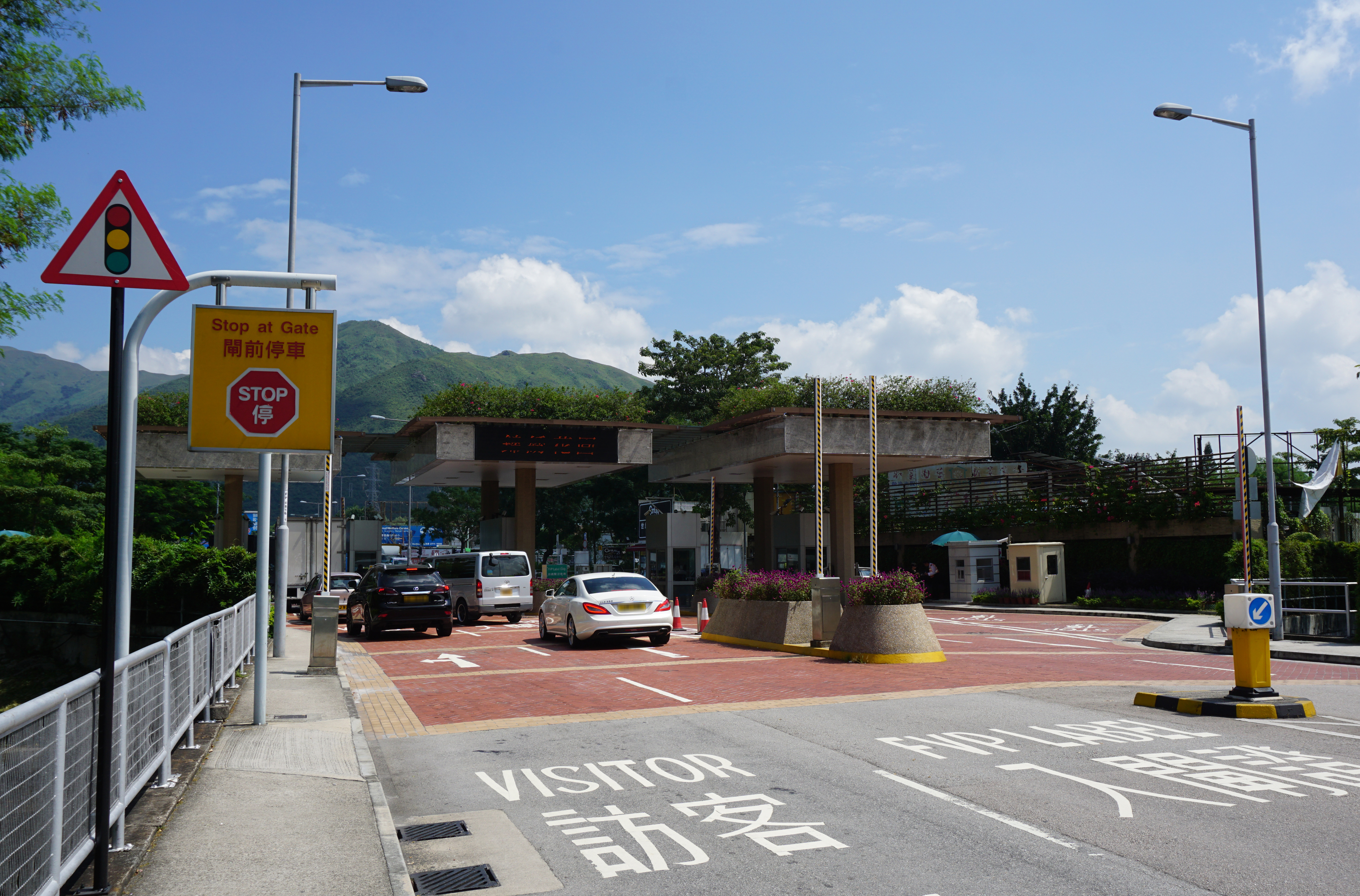
Fairview Park Gate

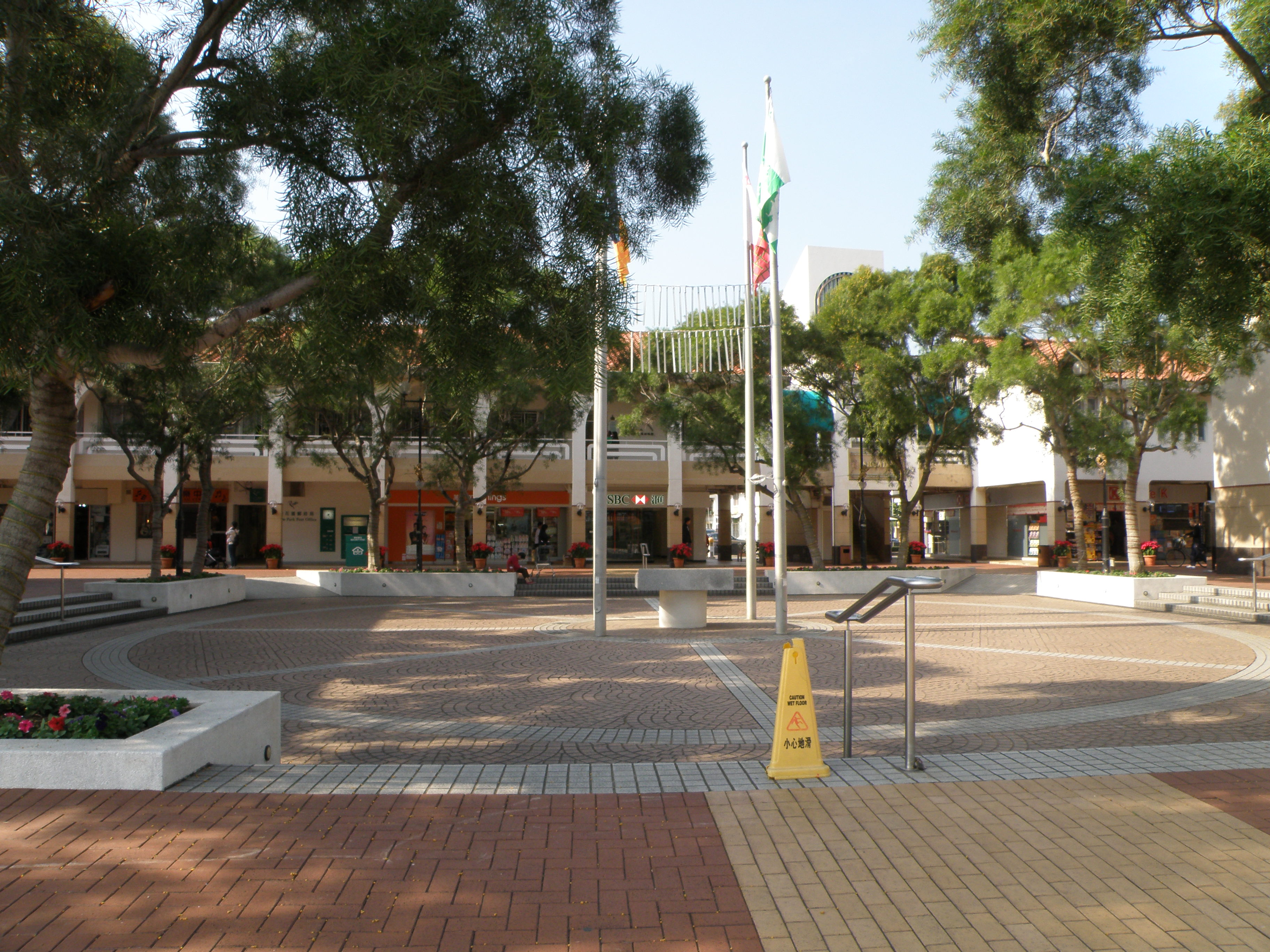
Fairview Park Town Centre

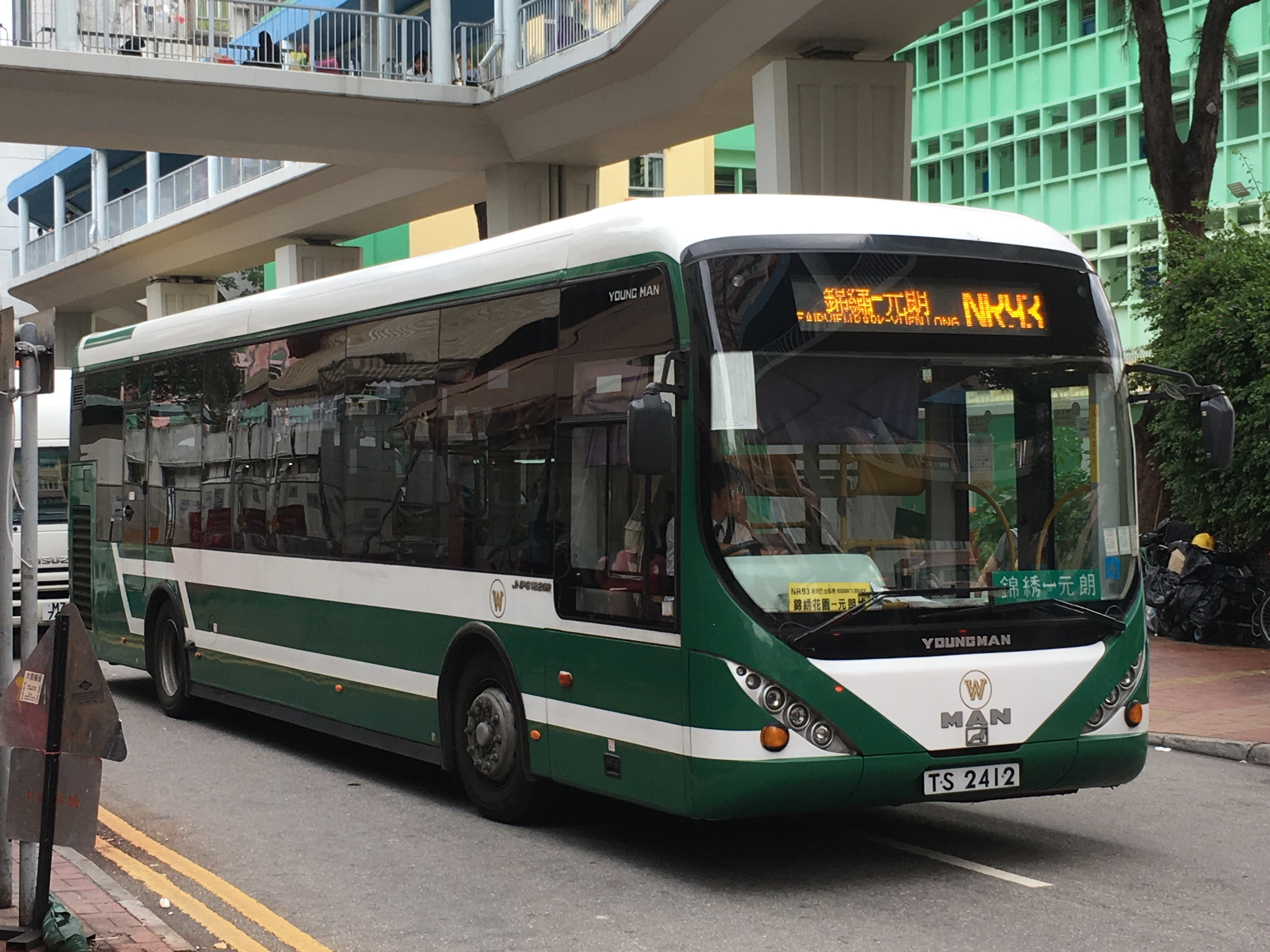
Fairview Park Shuttle Bus

Fairview Park (Chinese: 錦綉花園; Jyutping: gam2 sau3 faa1 jyun2; Cantonese Yale: gám sau fā yúhn) is a substantial private residential estate in the Yuen Long District in the New Territories of Hong Kong. It is unusual in Hong Kong for consisting of freestanding houses, rather than flats.

== History ==
Fairview Park was built in 1976 by Canadian Overseas Development (加拿大海外建設有限公司, afterward renamed to Fairland Holdings Limited 俊業海外建設有限公司) and completed between January 1977 to 27 December 1989.

The development of Fairview Park on fish farming land at Tai Shang Wai was a source of controversy at the time of its planning and construction. Concerns included ecological aspects, due to its proximity to marshland bordering Deep Bay, and the transport implications, with the majority of the inhabitants expected to work in the Victoria Harbour area.

== Features ==
The estate covers an area of 1.16 km^{2} (0.45 sq mi) and comprises 5,024 houses. There are 13 different types of house, ranging in size from 79 to 157 square metres (850 to 1,690 sq ft). Each house has a front and back garden as well as a car port. There is a 15,000 square metres (160,000 sq ft) artificial lake. Fairview Park has its own sewage treatment plant, the end product of which is used for watering vegetation, cleaning streets within the estate and providing a source of water for the nearby Mai Po prawn farm. Statistically, there are more than 100 streets, which measure a combined 27 kilometres (17 mi). It has three schools, 60 parks, a Christian and Missionary Alliance church, a supermarket, a fire station, medical centres, a post office, restaurants and a country club.

== Demographics ==
In the 2016 by-census, the population of the estate was recorded as 14,474. The median age of the residents was 45.6, slightly more than the Hong Kong-wide figure of 43.4.

== Education ==
Fairview Park is in Primary One Admission (POA) School Net 74. Within the school net are multiple aided schools (operated independently but funded with government money) and one government school: Yuen Long Government Primary School (元朗官立小學).

== Access road controversy ==
Fairview Park is a rare example of a self-contained gated community in Hong Kong, linked to the outside world by Fairview Park Boulevard, which despite being a private road has long been opened to the public; its heavy use by nearby villagers and businesses eventually became a source of controversy.

=== Accident ===
On 31 January 2007, a 12-year-old pupil riding his bike to school was run over and killed by a large truck at Fairview Park Boulevard. Fairview Park residents accused the Hong Kong Government of delaying the opening of the recently built Kam Pok Road (which bisects Fairview Park Boulevard near the Fairview Park gate) which cost roughly $10 million. This delay, they said, has resulted in Fairview Park Boulevard being turned into a major traffic thoroughfare.

On 2 February 2007, Fairview Park residents attended a special meeting organised by the Yuen Long District Council in which the Transport Department announced it would open Kam Pok Road on 5 February without restricting the use of Fairview Park Boulevard by heavy vehicles over seven metres in length. Fairview Park residents responded with outrage by waving placards and shouting. Some council members immediately left the meeting in protest. Fairview Park residents decided to convene a residents meeting themselves on 3 February 2007, to discuss further tactics. They revealed their desire to block trucks coming through by lying on the road. Fairview Park residents made a public pledge to drop their legal proceedings against the Transport Department if the Transport Department would ban heavy vehicle use on Fairvew Park Boulevard. The Transport Department said it would only make the next move when all legal proceedings are settled. The Transport Department was accused of cowardly behaviour by not standing up to certain groups. Transport Department deputy director Law Fung-ping was evasive and ambiguous in her answers when grilled by the hosts of RTHK Radio 1's HK2000 phone-in programme. Host Robert Chow Yung accused her department of cowardly behaviour.

=== Clashes ===
Kam Pok Road was opened to traffic by the Transport Department on 5 February 2007. By noon that day, Cable TV news images showed 100 Fairview Park residents demonstrating at the site of the bike accident by holding up placards. Fairview Park management staff then placed obstacles on the road blocking both access to part of the boulevard and consequently the ability of trucks making a turn. More than 100 Tai Sang Wai villagers traded insults with Fairview Park residents. Deputy chairman of the San Tin Rural Committee Fung Kan-cheung stressed that their village road which turned onto the boulevard, remains their only major access road to the outside world. Ms Leung, a Fairview Park resident, insisted that banning heavy vehicles on the boulevard would have no impact on the access of local villagers who used smaller vehicles. She went on, "We have tried every peaceful means in the past. The government does not listen when we are civilised." The owner of a nearby container storage yard objected to the heavy vehicle ban, saying Kam Pok Road was too narrow for container trucks to pass as he clashed with Fairview Park management staff. Mr Lam Kok-fai, the manager for Fairview Park management together with RTHK Radio 1's HK2000 phone-in programme host Robert Chow Yung, questioned what sort of powerful organisations would cause such a delay in the opening of Kam Pok Road from the Traffic Department. Transport Department deputy director Law Fung-ping again failed to sufficiently explain such cause.

== See also ==
- Hong Lok Yuen
