= Kam Sheung Road station =

MTR station in the New Territories, Hong Kong

Kam Sheung Road 錦上路
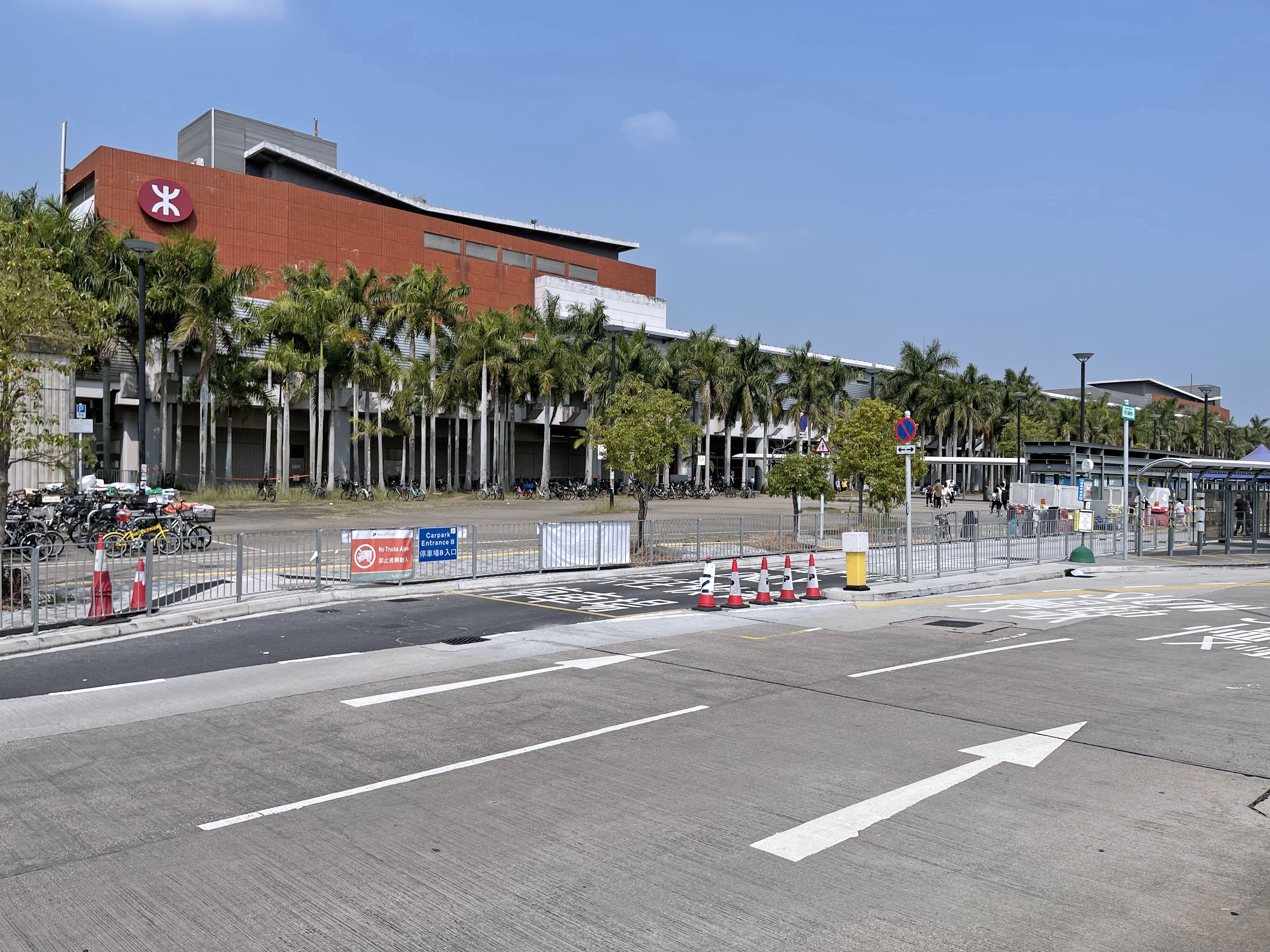
- Exterior of Kam Sheung Road station

Chinese name
- Traditional Chinese: 錦上路
- Simplified Chinese: 锦上路
- Jyutping: gam^{2} soeng^{6} lou^{6}
- Cantonese Yale: Gámséuhnglouh
- Literal meaning: Upper Fairfield Road
Transcriptions
Standard Mandarin
- Hanyu Pinyin: Jǐnshànglù
Yue: Cantonese
- Yale Romanization: Gámséuhnglouh
- Jyutping: gam^{2} soeng^{6} lou^{6}

General information
- Location: Tung Wui Road, Kam Tin; Yuen Long District, Hong Kong
- Coordinates: 22°26′05″N 114°03′48″E
- System: MTR rapid transit station
- Owner: KCR Corporation
- Operator: MTR Corporation
- Lines: Tuen Ma line; Northern Link (Under construction)
- Platforms: 2 (1 island platform)
- Tracks: 2
- Connections: Bus, minibus

Construction
- Structure type: Elevated
- Accessible: Yes
- Architect: RMJM

Other information
- Station code: KSR

History
- Opened: 20 December 2003; 22 years ago
- Former names: Pat Heung, Kam Tin

Services
Preceding station	MTR	Following station
Yuen Long towards Tuen Mun	Tuen Ma line	Tsuen Wan West towards Wu Kai Sha
Under construction
Terminus	Northern Link Opening 2034	Au Tau towards Kwu Tung or Huanggang Port
Proposed (2039)
Terminus	Central Rail Link	Tsuen King Circuit towards Kowloon Tong
Track layout
Location
- Location within MTR

Kam Sheung Road (Chinese: 錦上路; Jyutping: gam^{2} soeng^{6} lou^{6}; Cantonese Yale: Gámséuhnglouh) is an MTR station on the Tuen Ma line, located between Pat Heung and Kam Tin in Hong Kong. It is situated between Tsuen Wan West and Yuen Long stations. Kam Sheung Road was the location for the KCR West Rail's opening ceremony.

== History ==
On 20 December 2003, Kam Sheung Road station opened to the public along with other KCR West Rail stations.

On 27 June 2021, the West Rail line officially merged with the Ma On Shan line (which was already extended into the Tuen Ma line Phase 1 at the time) in East Kowloon to form the new Tuen Ma line, as part of the Shatin to Central link project. Kam Sheung Road was included in the project and is now an intermediate station on the Tuen Ma line.

Since 27 September 2026, exit B and exit C has been closed and will be relocated to comply with the construction of Northern Link.

== Description ==
The station is an elevated structure along the viaduct to the north of one of the two rail depots of the Tuen Ma line. The MTR Kam Tin Building is just north of the station building and once housed the West Rail control centre, but the facility relocated to the main MTR control centre in Tsing Yi after the railway merger.

The station itself is a short distance from the towns of Kam Tin or Pat Heung. As residents from nearby could not decide upon the name of the settlement that the station would be named after, the main road nearest to the station was used instead.

Although the station was not expected to have high passenger patronage relative to others, the station attracted a number of villagers from Kam Tin and Pat Heung since the Tuen Ma line is their only direct link to urban areas in Kowloon. If the Northern Link (to Lok Ma Chau) is built, Kam Sheung Road will serve as the interchange with the Northern Link, and the station will be expanded as well.

There was a flea market, which was completely closed on 2 February 2026, beside the station building with more than 150 stalls. From 26 September to 28 November 2004, the West Rail Sightseeing Bus was introduced, attracting thousands of Kowloon residents.

The station is close to the Shek Kong Airfield.

== Future expansion ==
Kam Sheung Road will be one of the terminus stations on the Northern Link, a future MTR rapid transit line which will connect the Tuen Ma line and the Lok Ma Chau Spur Line of the East Rail line at Kwu Tung Station. The link will also serve as a connection to the border checkpoints to mainland China at Huanggang Port Station while also facilitating travels between eastern and western New Territories.

== Station layout ==
P Platforms	Platform 1	Tuen Ma line towards Tuen Mun (Yuen Long) →
P Platforms	Island platform, doors will open on the right
P Platforms	Platform 2	← Tuen Ma line towards Wu Kai Sha (Tsuen Wan West)
G	Concourse	Exits, transport interchange
G	Concourse	Car park, cycle park
L1; Platforms	Platform 3	Northern Link (under construction) towards Kwu Tung or Huanggang Port (Au Tau) →
L1; Platforms	Island platform, doors will open on the right
L1; Platforms	Platform 4	← Northern Link (under construction) termination platform

Platforms 1 and 2 share the same island platform. Although the train tracks are exposed from above, platform screen doors are still fitted.

== Entrances/exits ==
- A: MTR Kam Tin Building
- B and C are closed while the Northern Link construction work is carried out
- D: Kam Ho Road

== Gallery ==
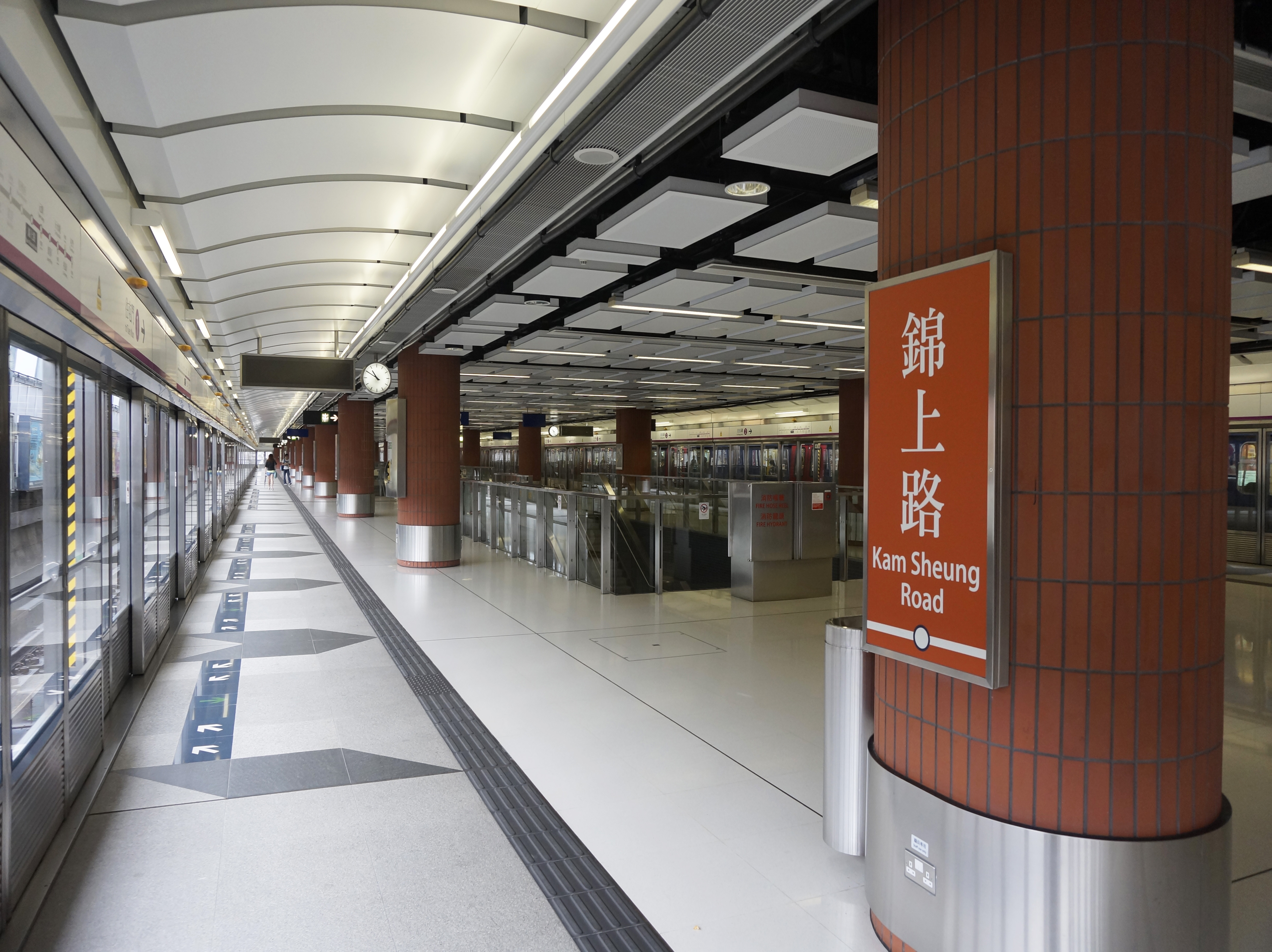
Station platform

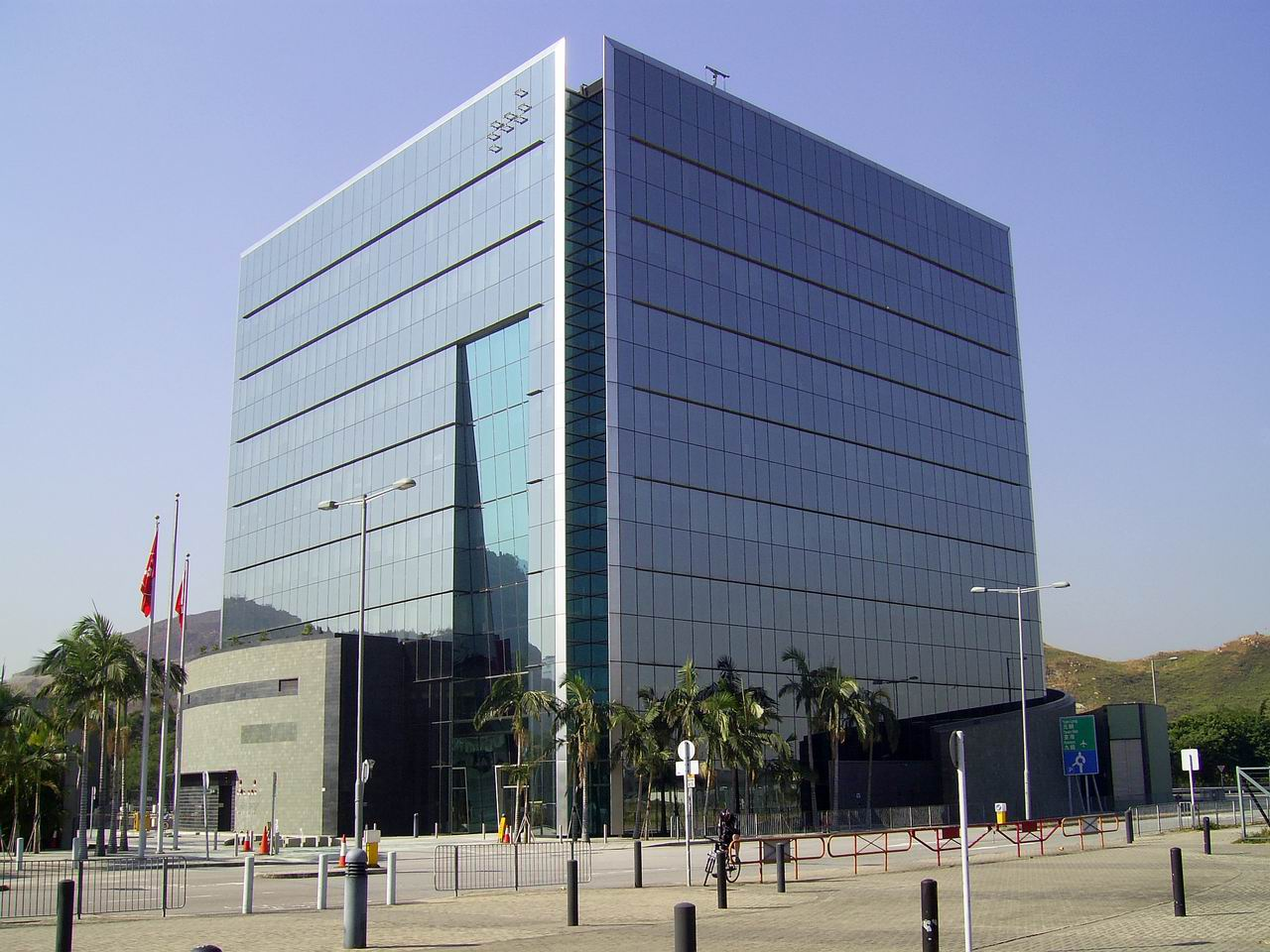
Administrative building on the station grounds

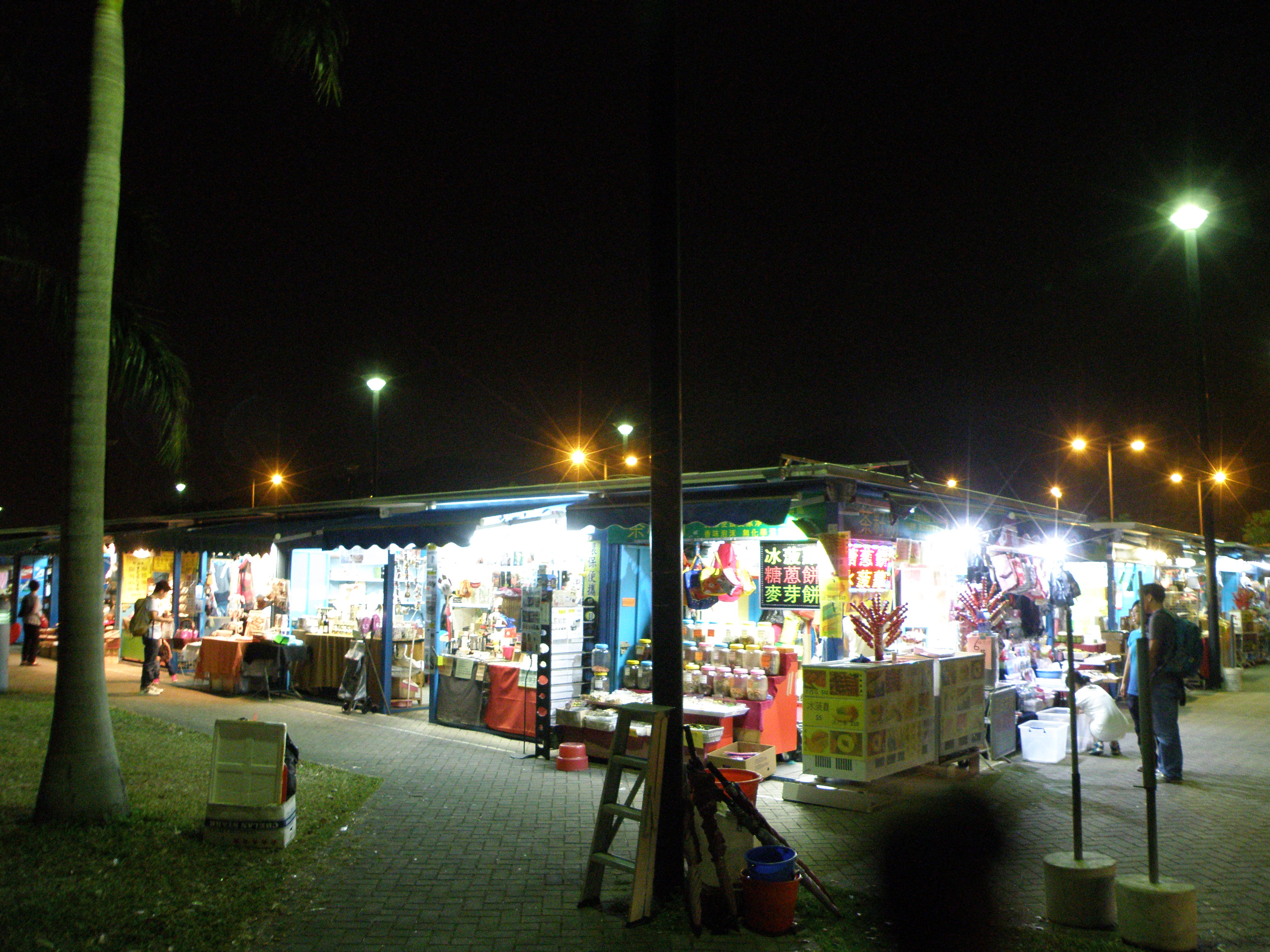
Bazaar at night

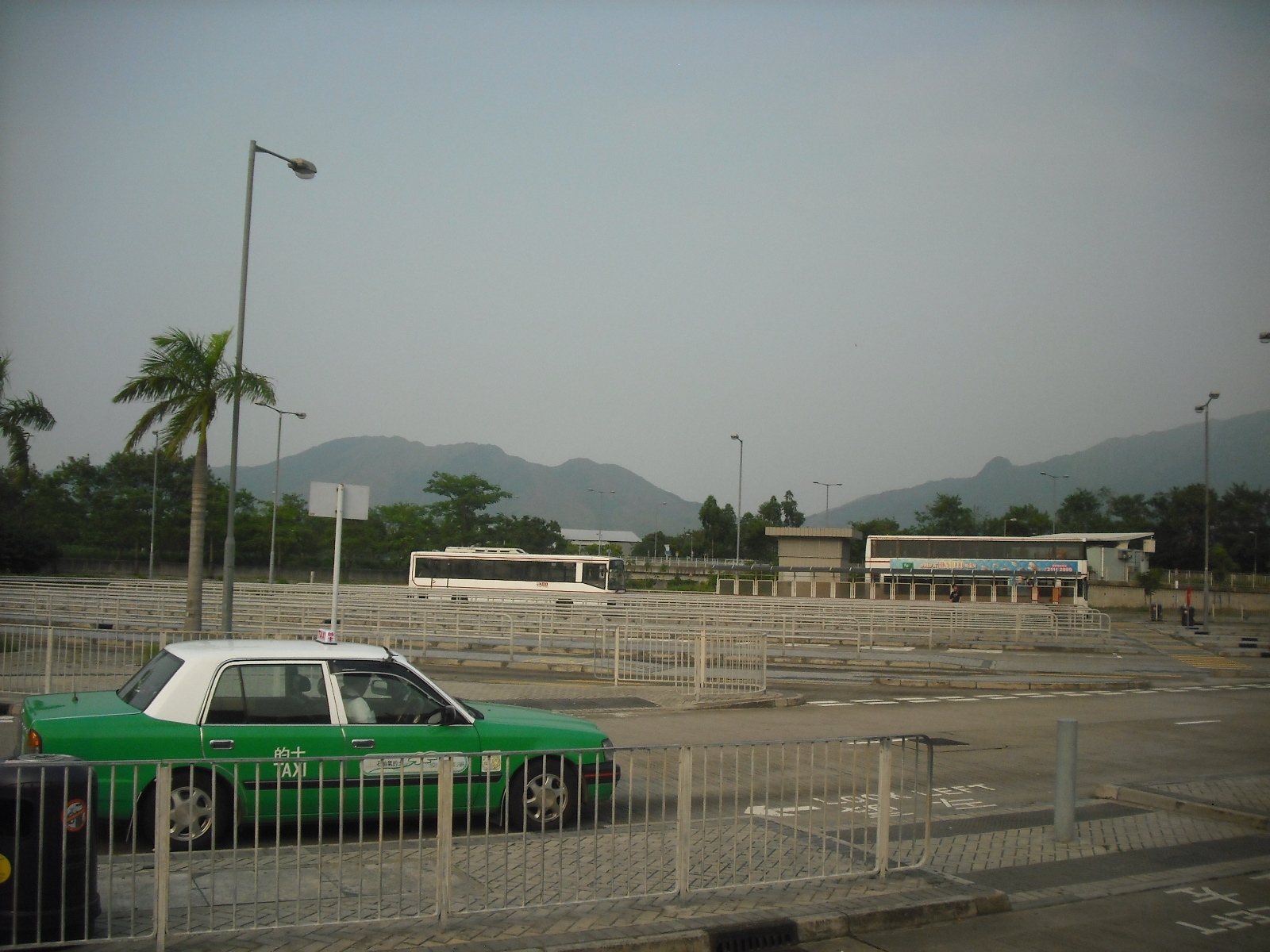
Public transport interchange
