= Huanggang Checkpoint station =

Metro station in Shenzhen, China

Huanggang Checkpoint 皇岗口岸
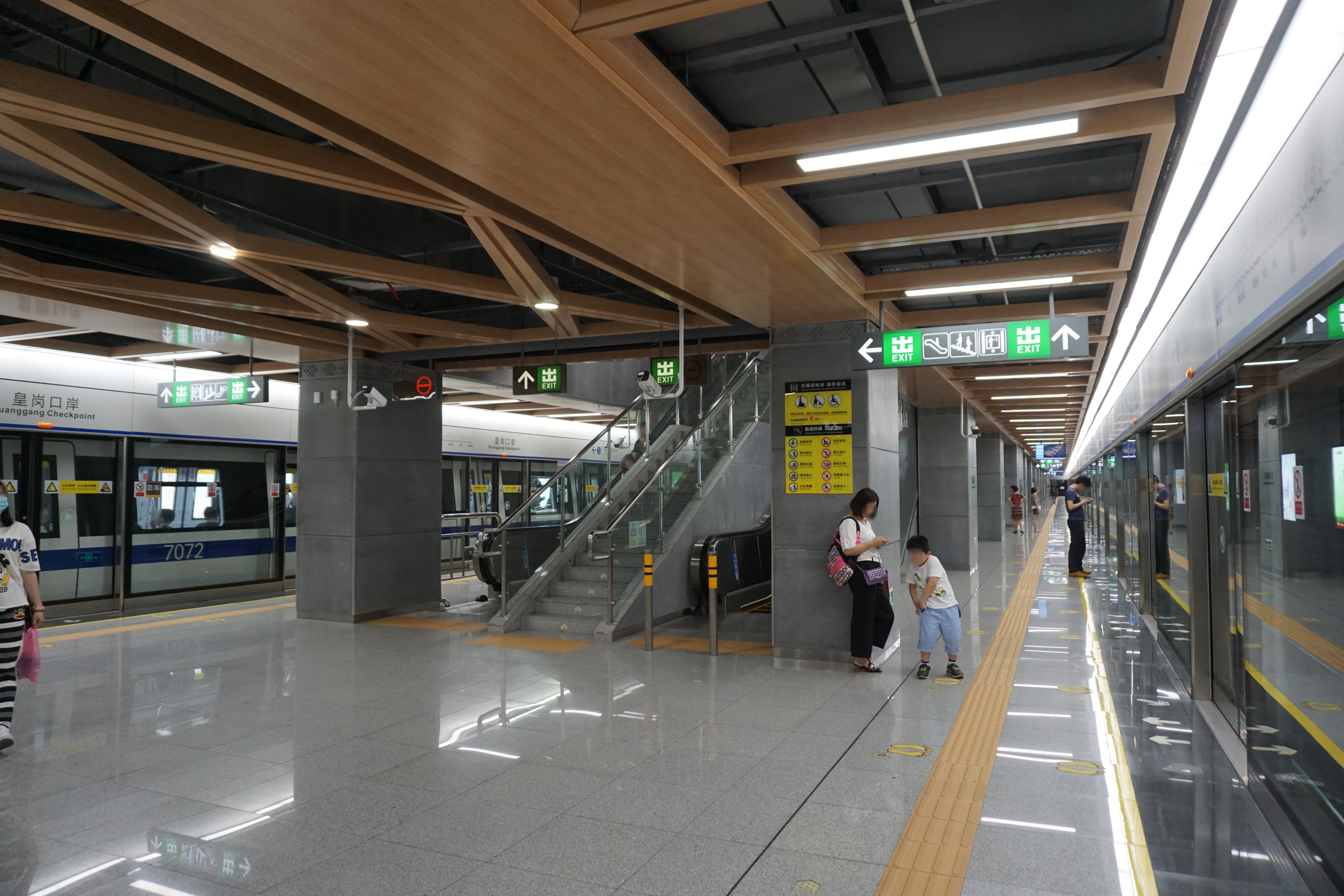
- Platform

General information
- Location: Futian District, Shenzhen, Guangdong; China
- Operator: SZMC (Shenzhen Metro Group)
- Line: Line 7
- Platforms: 2 (1 island platform)
- Tracks: 2

Construction
- Structure type: Underground
- Accessible: Yes

History
- Opened: 28 October 2016 (9 years ago)

Services
Preceding station	Shenzhen Metro	Following station
Fumin towards SZU Lihu Campus	Line 7	Chiwei towards Tai'an
Transfer at Huanggang Port station (2034)
Preceding station	MTR	Following station
The Loop towards Kam Sheung Road	Northern Link transfer at Huanggang Port	Terminus
Route map
Location

Huanggang Checkpoint station
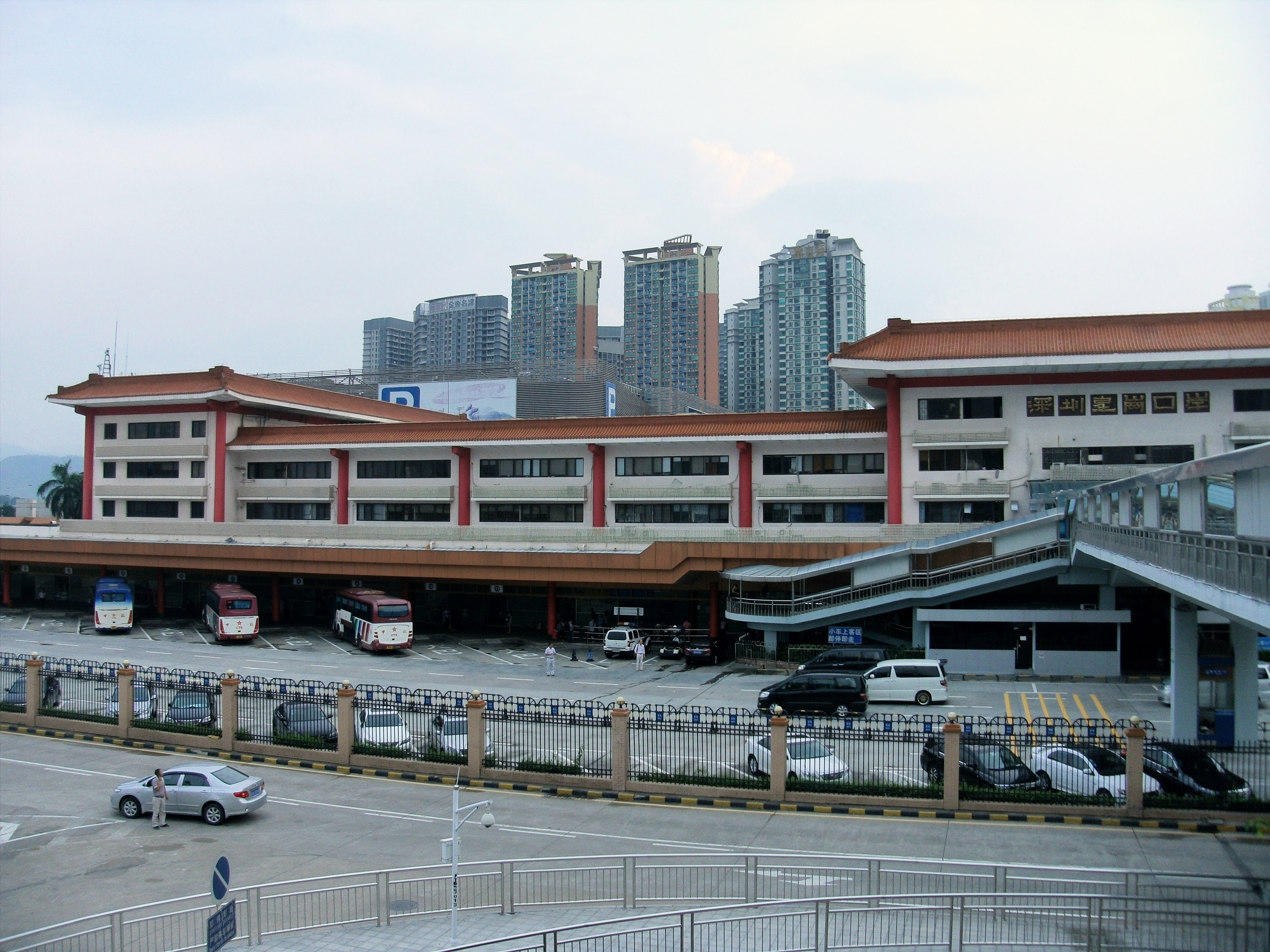
- Huanggang Port pedestrian crossing
- Simplified Chinese: 皇岗口岸站
- Traditional Chinese: 皇崗口岸站
Transcriptions
Standard Mandarin
- Hanyu Pinyin: Huánggǎng Kǒu'àn Zhàn
Yue: Cantonese
- Jyutping: wong^{4} gong^{1} hau^{2} ngon^{6} zaam^{6}

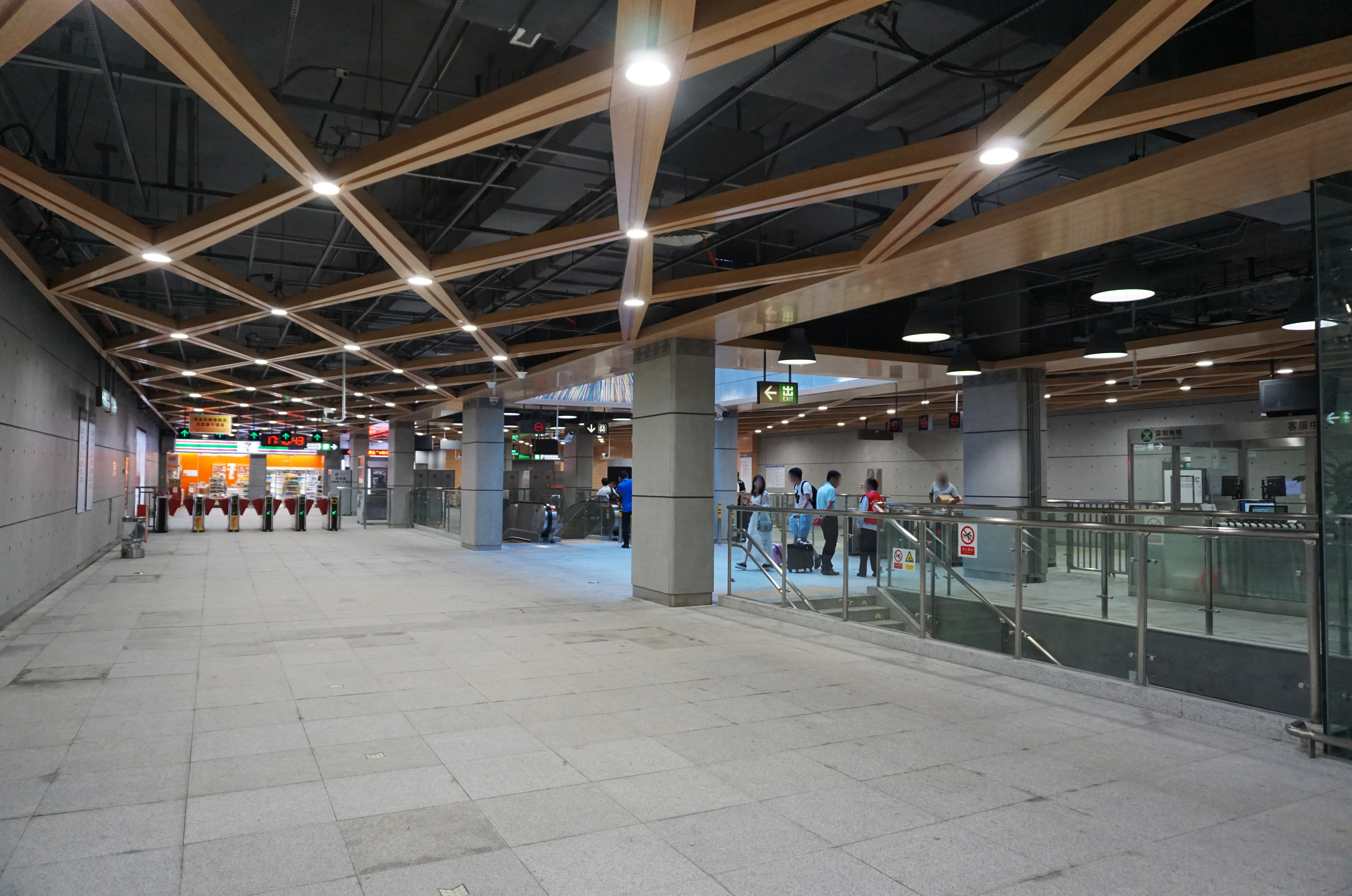
Concourse

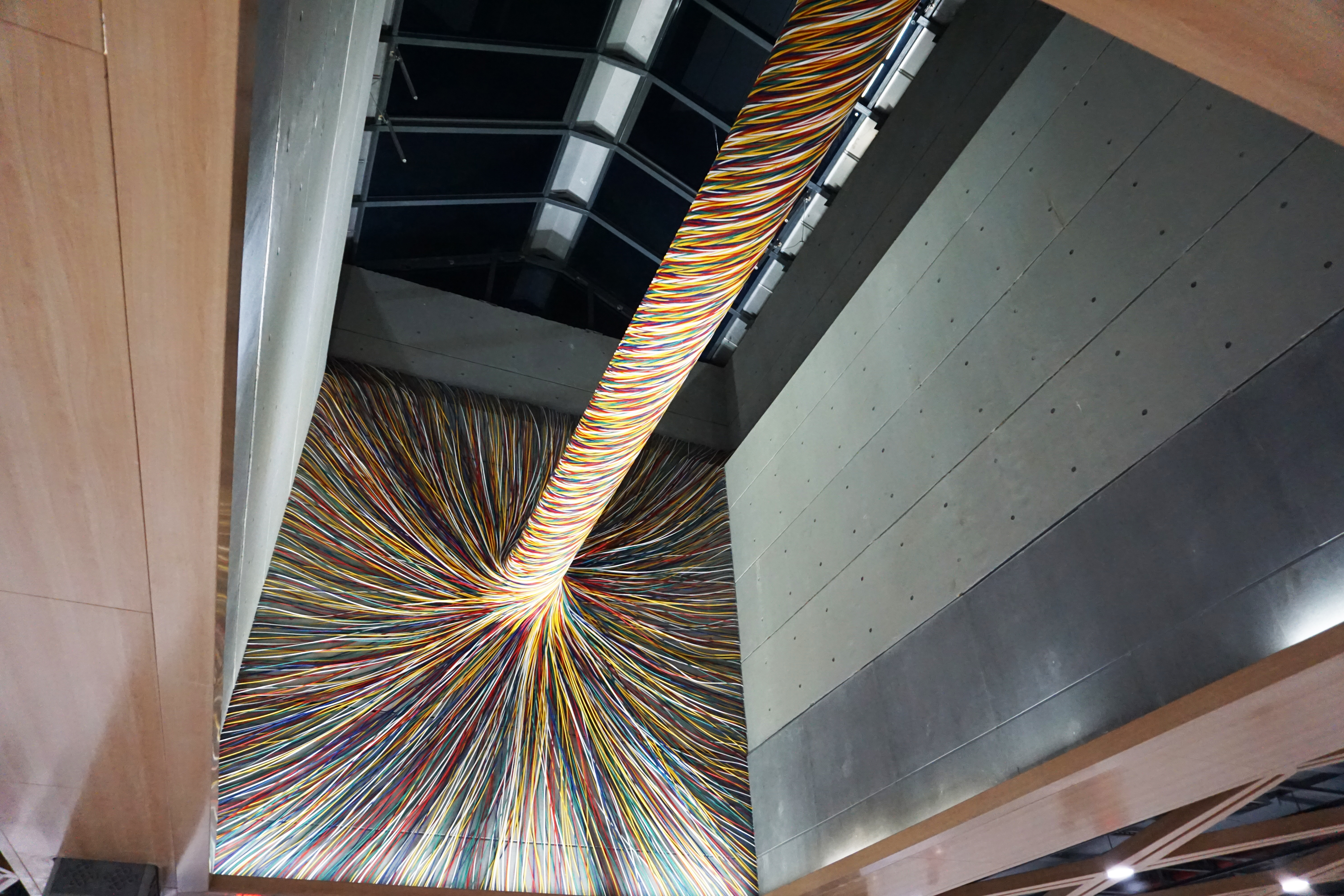
Art Wall

Huanggang Checkpoint station (simplified Chinese: 皇岗口岸站; traditional Chinese: 皇崗口岸站; Jyutping: wong^{4} gong^{1} hau^{2} ngon^{6} zaam^{6}; pinyin: Huánggǎng Kǒu'àn Zhàn) is a station on Line 7 of the Shenzhen Metro at Huanggang Port. It opened on 28 October 2016.

== Station layout ==
1F
Exit
Exit C, D, E, F
B1
Concourse
Lobby
Ticket machines, Customer service, Shops, full body scanners,

Exit A, B

B2
Platforms
Platform
7 towards SZU Lihu Campus (Fumin)
Island platform, doors will open on the left
Platform
7 towards Tai'an (Chiwei)

== Exits ==
Exit	Destination
A	Huanggang Port (To Hong Kong only)
B	Huanggang Port (From Hong Kong only)
C	Tonghe Road (E), Baihe 2nd Road (N)
D	Tonghe Road (E), Baihe 2nd Road (N), Shenzhen Checkpoint Command Center Building
（Temporarily closed)	Futian South Road (W), Baihe 2nd Road (N), Tonghe Road (E), City Cube, Huanggang Checkpoint Intercity-bus Station
F	Tonghe Road (W), Baihe 3rd Road (N), Huanggang Checkpoint Intercity-bus Station
