= Kwu Tung station =

Future MTR station in the New Territories, Hong Kong

Kwu Tung 古洞
- The East Rail Line section of the Kwu Tung station in October 2026

Chinese name
- Chinese: 古洞
- Literal meaning: Ancient Cave
Transcriptions
Standard Mandarin
- Hanyu Pinyin: Gǔdòng
Yue: Cantonese
- Jyutping: gu^{2} dung^{6}

General information
- Location: Ho Sheung Heung Road × Ma Tso Lung Road, Kwu Tung; North District, Hong Kong
- Coordinates: 22°30′27″N 114°05′59″E
- Elevation: Underground
- System: Future MTR rapid transit station (Construction began in September 2023)
- Owner: KCR Corporation
- Operator: MTR Corporation
- Lines: East Rail line (expected 2027); Northern Link (expected 2034)
- Platforms: 2 (1 island platform)
- Tracks: 2
- Connections: Bus, minibus

Construction
- Structure type: Underground
- Platform levels: 1

Other information
- Station code: KTU
- Website: Kwu Tung Station

History
- Opening: Expected: 2027
- Electrified: 25 kV 50 Hz AC (Overhead line)

Key dates
- 2021: Planning and design commences
- 2022: Project gazetted under the Railway Ordinance
- 2023: Commencement of construction
- 2027: Expected completion of construction

Services
Preceding station	MTR	Following station
Sheung Shui towards Admiralty	East Rail line Opening 2027	Lok Ma Chau Terminus
San Tin towards Kam Sheung Road	Northern Link Opening 2034	Terminus
San Tin towards Kam Sheung Road	Northern Link Proposed	Lo Wu South towards Ping Che
Location
- Location within MTR

Kwu Tung (Chinese: 古洞站; Jyutping: gu^{2} dung^{6}) is an underground infill station currently under construction. It is situated on the Lok Ma Chau spur line of the East Rail line of the MTR rapid transit network in Hong Kong. The station will be situated near Kwu Tung in North District, New Territories and once completed, will be the 100th station of the MTR.

It is part of the first phase of the Northern Link and will act as its eastern terminus when phase 2 is completed, with an expected construction cost of HK$5.9 billion as of July 2023.

== History ==
In 2001, KCR Corporation, then operator of the East Rail line (known then simply as the "East Rail"), proposed a spur line that would reach the Lok Ma Chau checkpoint. A small area of land in Kwu Tung, an area in between Sheung Shui and Lok Ma Chau, was acquired by KCR for the construction of an underground station. When construction began in 2002, the length of the spur line was built using tunnel boring machines (TBMs) through Kwu Tung. An underground station box structure was constructed through cut-and-cover, featuring the running tunnels running alongside an island platform. When the spur line finally opened in 2007, trains ran through the unfinished Kwu Tung station but never stopped there. While the station was never completed, in 2007, the design contractor Arup stated the retaining wall would be strong enough for any future construction works. Also, the structures on the edges of the unfinished platforms were strong enough for future installation of any platform screen doors. Until excavation was completed in 2024, the station only consists of an underground area excavated allowing for future platforms.

In 2014, after the merger of KCR and MTR, the Government supported the completion of the station and the development of the Northern Link and recommended the MTR Corporation to do so. The Hong Kong Government investigation found that 447 ha (4.47 km^{2}) of land in Kwu Tung North is available for development as part of the government's plan to increase the area's population by 114,300.

In 2021, MTR announced that Arup, the design contractor for the original station box, would be returning for the first phase of the Northern Link. The construction of the station was approved by the government in 2021, in anticipation of rising transport demand in the Kwu Tung North New Development Area.

On 11 November 2022, the government gazetted approval for the construction of the station. On 8 September 2023, MTR awarded the contract for the design and construction of the station to Bouygues. A groundbreaking ceremony was held on 29 September.

As of 5 November 2025, the platform screen doors at Kwu Tung station have been fully installed. Subsequently, the East Rail Line portion of the station was topped out on the 19th of the same month.

East Rail Line trains are expected to start operating at this station in 2027. The station will serve as a major public transport hub in the northern New Territories when the Northern Link is completed in 2034.

== Layout and structure ==
This station has a set of island platform structures, and can install the necessary equipment in a short time to become an operational station. However, no platform structure has been reserved for the Northern Link, so new platforms will need to be built north of the station in the future. On the ground level, there are two emergency exits, including fire lifts and stairs, while other areas are covered with stone ballast.

Ground level	Exits under construction (Ho Sheung Heung Road, Ma Tso Lung Road)
Concourse	Concourse (under construction)
Platform	Platform 2	East Rail line towards Admiralty and Lo Wu (Sheung Shui) →
Platform	Island platform, under construction, not opened to the public
Platform	Platform 1	← East Rail line towards Lok Ma Chau (terminus)

Until May 2026, Northern Link platforms and concourse are still under planning stages.

== Gallery ==
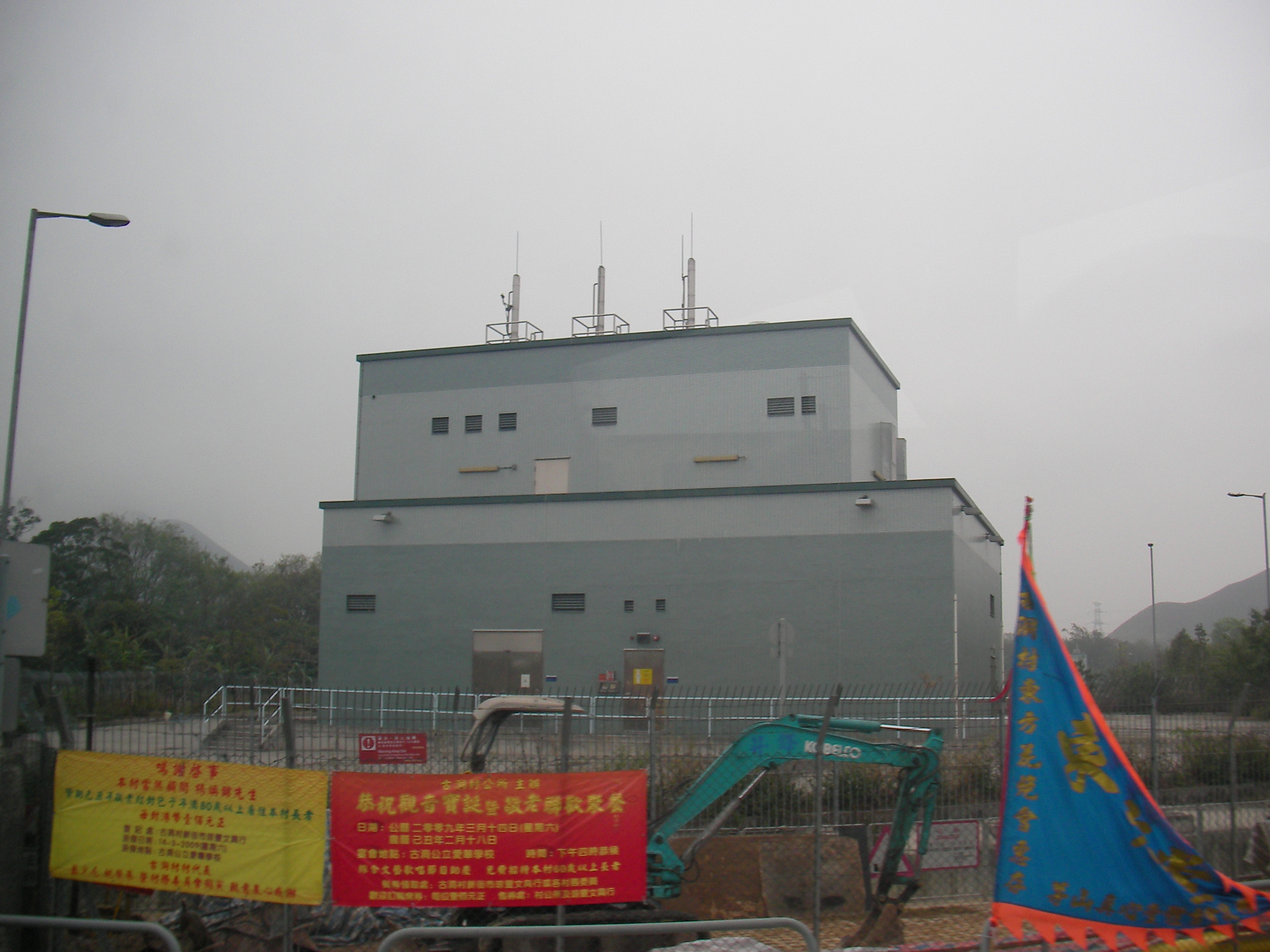
The place reserved for the building of Kwu Tung station in the future

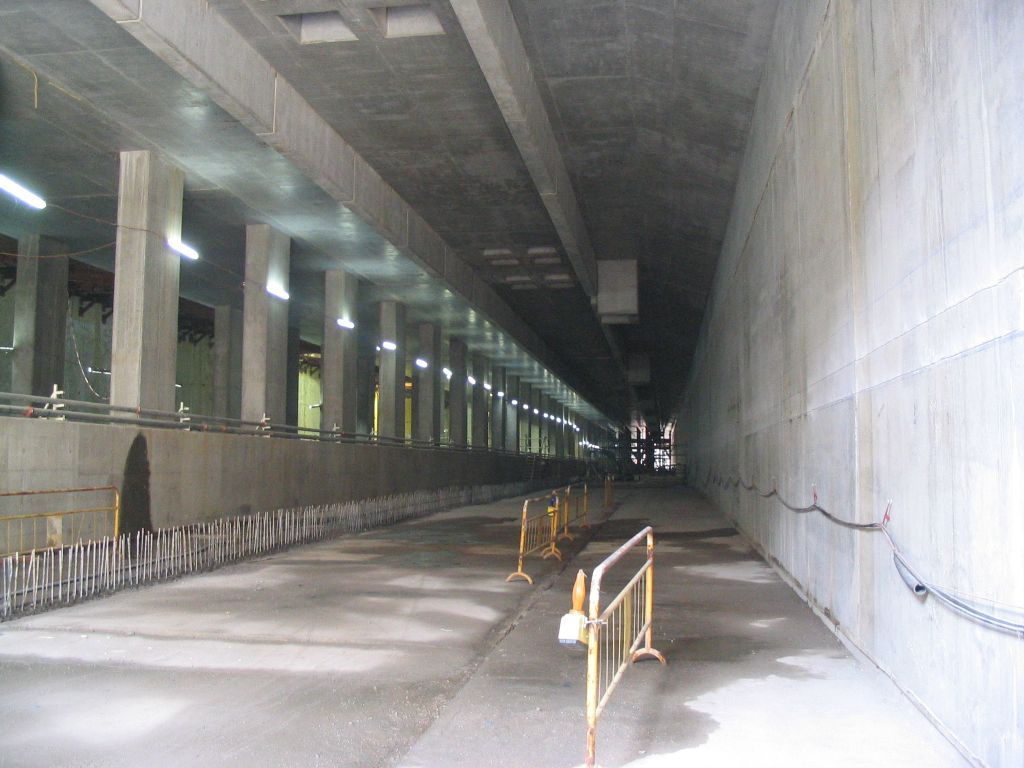
Area reserved for platform structure

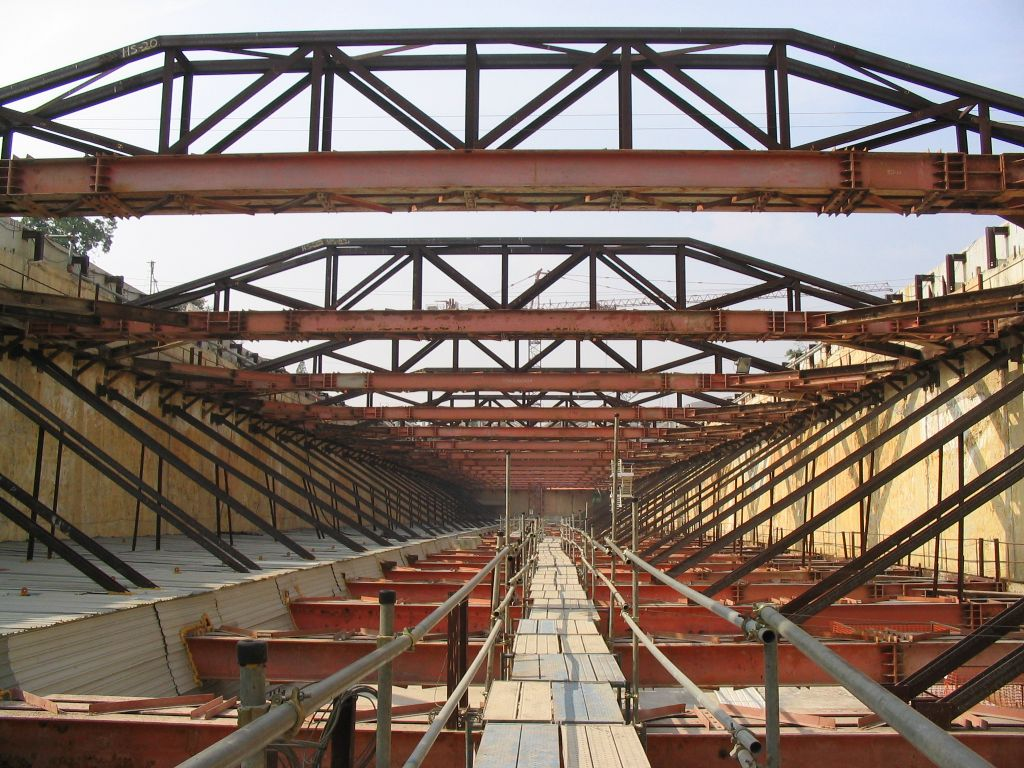
Kwu Tung station reserve structure under construction (January 2005)
