= Hallifax =

The surname Hallifax may refer to:

- David Hallifax (1927–1992), Constable and Governor of Windsor Castle
- Edwin Richard Hallifax (1874–1950), senior official in Hong Kong
- Emily Hallifax (born 2005), French diver
- Guy Hallifax (1884–1941), South African military commander
- Samuel Hallifax (1733–1790), English bishop and academic
- Thomas Hallifax (1722–1789), English politician
- Tom Hallifax (b. 1965), Anglo-Irish contemporary artist

== See also ==
- Halifax (disambiguation)
