= Haligonian =

Haligonian may refer to:

- of or from Halifax, Nova Scotia, Canada
- of or from Halifax, West Yorkshire, England
- Haligonian, a 1925 schooner built to race Bluenose

== See also ==
- Halifax (name)
