= Halifax =

Halifax commonly refers to:

- Halifax, Nova Scotia, Canada
- Halifax, West Yorkshire, England
- Halifax (bank), a British bank

Halifax may also refer to:

== Places ==
=== Australia ===
- Halifax, Queensland, a coastal town
  - Halifax Bay, the wider region

=== Canada ===
==== Nova Scotia ====
- Halifax, Nova Scotia, the province's capital
  - Downtown Halifax
  - Halifax Peninsula
  - Mainland Halifax
- Halifax County, Nova Scotia, dissolved 1996
- Halifax (federal electoral district)
- Halifax (provincial electoral district)
- Halifax Harbour, a saltwater harbour
- Halifax West, a federal electoral district since 1979

==== Elsewhere in Canada ====
- Halifax Parish, Prince Edward Island
- Halifax Range, British Columbia

=== England ===
- Halifax, West Yorkshire, England
  - Halifax (UK Parliament constituency)

=== United States ===
- Halifax, Kentucky
- Halifax, Massachusetts
  - Halifax (MBTA station)
- Halifax, Missouri
- Halifax, North Carolina
  - Halifax County, North Carolina
- Halifax, Pennsylvania, a borough
  - Halifax Township, Dauphin County, Pennsylvania
- Halifax, Vermont
- Halifax, Virginia
  - Halifax County, Virginia
- Halifax area, Florida
- Halifax River, Florida

== People ==
- Halifax (name), including a list of people and characters with the name
- Earl of Halifax

== Arts and entertainment ==
- Halifax (band)
- Halifax f.p., an Australian crime series
- "Halifax", a song by Pete Yorn from ArrangingTime

== Businesses and organisations ==
- Halifax (bank), founded 1853
- Halifax (Ireland), a financial services company, 1965–2010
- Halifax College, University of York, England

== Military craft ==
- HMCS Halifax, either of two Canadian warships
  - Halifax-class frigate
- HMS Halifax, any of several Royal Navy ships
- Handley Page Halifax, a British heavy bomber aircraft

== Sports ==
=== England ===
- FC Halifax Town, a professional football club
  - Halifax Town A.F.C., a former professional football club
- Halifax Panthers, a professional rugby league club

=== Canada ===
- Halifax Mooseheads, a junior ice hockey team
- Halifax Thunderbirds, a professional box lacrosse team
- Halifax Tides FC, a professional women's soccer team
- HFX Wanderers FC, a professional soccer team
- Halifax Hoopers, a former professional basketball team
- Halifax Hurricanes, a former professional basketball team
- Halifax Rainmen, a former professional basketball team

== See also ==
- Halifax Explosion, a 1917 Canadian maritime disaster
- Halifax Gibbet, an early guillotine
