= Halifax station =

Halifax station may refer to:

== Rail ==
- Halifax railway station (England)
- Halifax North Bridge railway station, England (defunct)
- Halifax St Pauls railway station, England (defunct)
- Halifax station (Nova Scotia), Canada
- Halifax station (MBTA), Massachusetts, United States

== Other uses ==
- Halifax bus station, England
- Halifax Station, or North America and West Indies Station, a British Royal Navy formation

== See also ==
- Halifax (disambiguation)
