= Hong Kong Golf Club =

Private golf club in Hong Kong

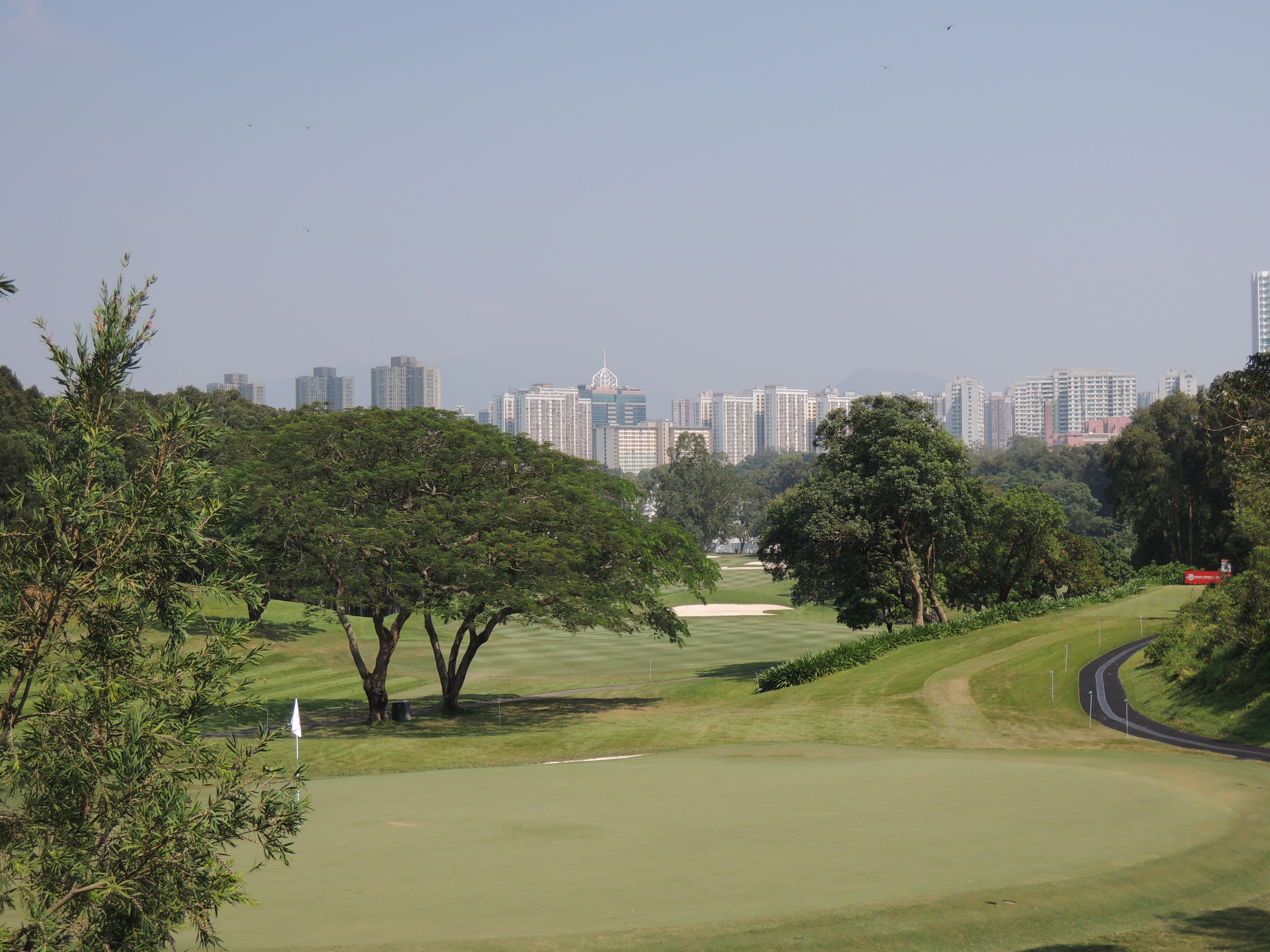
- Hong Kong Golf Club
- Interactive map of Hong Kong Golf Club
- 22.492°N 114.115°E

Club information
- Location: Fanling, Hong Kong
- Established: 1889; 137 years ago
- Type: Private
- Total holes: 63
- Tournaments: Hong Kong Open
- Website: www.hkgolfclub.org

Old Course
- Par: 71
- Length: 6,246 yards

Eden Course
- Par: 70
- Length: 6,128 yards

New Course
- Par: 70
- Length: 6,547 yards

Deep Water Bay
- Par: 28
- Length: 1,608 yards

Hong Kong Golf Club
- Traditional Chinese: 香港哥爾夫球會
- Simplified Chinese: 香港哥尔夫球会
Transcriptions
Standard Mandarin
- Hanyu Pinyin: Xiānggǎng Gēěrfū Qiúhuì
Yue: Cantonese
- Jyutping: hoeng1 gong2 go1 ji5 fu1 kau4 wui5

Royal Hong Kong Golf Club
- Traditional Chinese: 皇家香港哥爾夫球會
- Simplified Chinese: 皇家香港哥尔夫球会
Transcriptions
Standard Mandarin
- Hanyu Pinyin: Huángjiā Xiānggǎng Gēěrfū Qiúhuì
Yue: Cantonese
- Jyutping: wong4 gaa1 hoeng1 gong2 go1 ji5 fu1 kau4 wui5

The Hong Kong Golf Club is a private golf club. It is home to the Hong Kong Open, a tournament co-sanctioned by the European and Asian Tours.

Founded in 1889 as the Royal Hong Kong Golf Club, the club originally played in Happy Valley, a location shared with many other activities. As the club expanded, the need for a more permanent home was addressed with the building of a small 9-hole course at Deep Water Bay, before the club eventually moved to its current location in Fanling, most of which is leased from the Hong Kong government. According to the club annals, the Deep Water Bay location opened in 1898; and the 18-hole Old Course was completed in 1911. To expand the facility, in 1968, the club negotiated the lease of around 30 acres of land at Beas River with which it expanded the Eden Course into a full 18-hole championship course. The 'Royal' was dropped from the name of the club in 1996, in advance of the transfer of sovereignty over Hong Kong from the United Kingdom to the People's Republic of China.

The club paid a one-off premium to lease the land, and is wrongly labelled to pay only a peppercorn rent annually. In 2012, the club paid HK$1.9 million for rent and HK$3.2 million for rates. In Year 2013–2014, the Government Rent Payable is HK$2,538,000.

== History ==
=== 1889–1910 ===
On 8 May 1889, a notice was published on the Hong Kong Daily Press:

"GENTLEMEN INTERESTED IN THE ROYAL AND ANCIENT GAME OF GOLF ARE REQUESTED TO ATTEND A MEETING TO BE HELD IN THE HONGKONG CLUB ON FRIDAY 10TH MAY, 1889 AT 5 pm. TO CONSIDER THE QUESTION OF STARTING A GOLF LINKS IN HONGKONG OR KOWLOON."

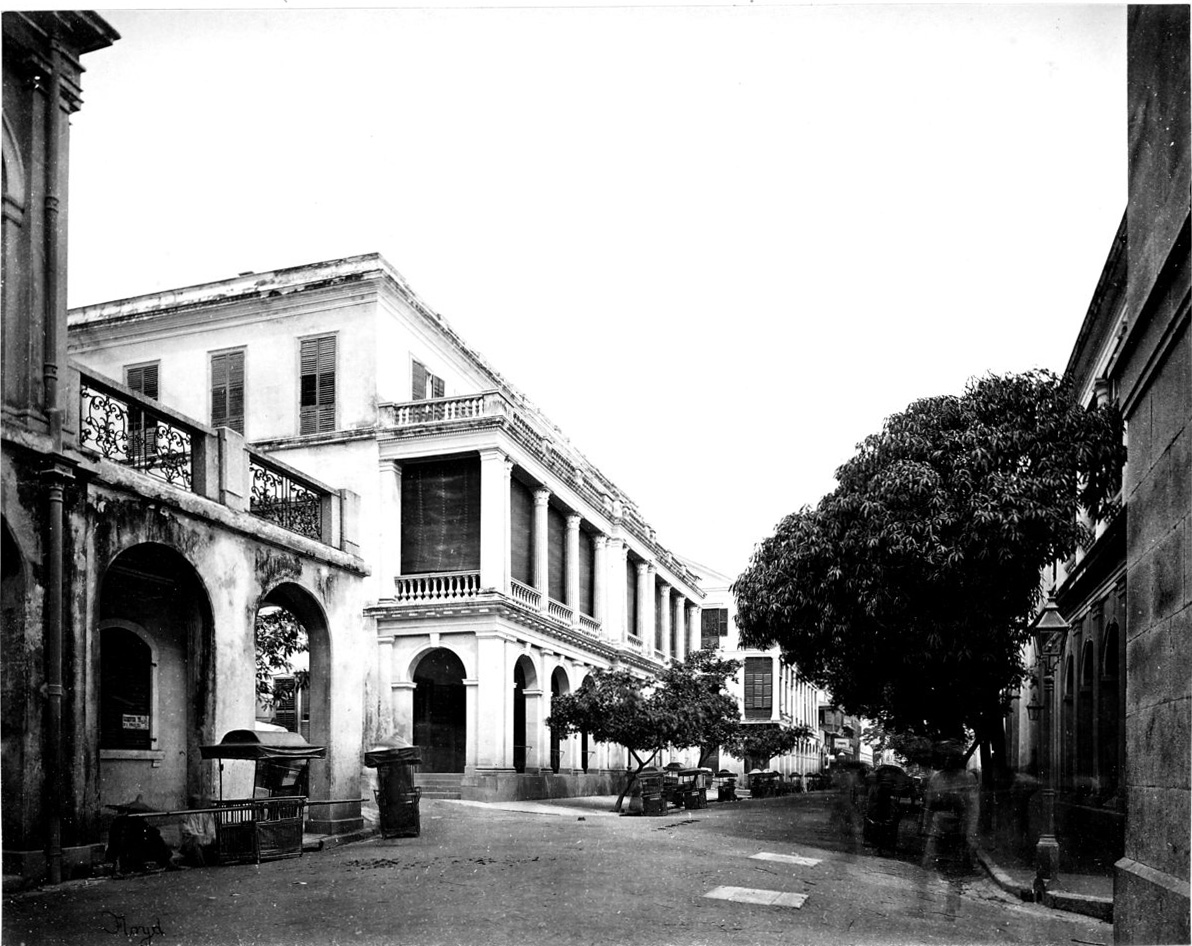
The first meeting of Hong Kong Golf Club was held at the first Hong Kong Club clubhouse at the corner of Wyndham Street and Queen's Road in 1889.

Then, the "Royal Hong Kong Golf Club" was started in 1889 by "thirteen golfing enthusiasts" in a shared location in Happy Valley. According to "History of the Royal Hongkong Golf Club", which was written by T.F.R. Waters, of these thirteen, with the exception of Robert Murray Rumsey R.N. (then Hong Kong Harbour Master and the Rumsey Street was named after his name.) and Gershom Stewart (afterwards Knighted and a member of parliament for Hoylake) very few had much notion of the game but readily agreed to do what they could to established a foothold for it in the Colony. Although Captain Rumsey and Stewart had clubs and balls and had in fact been driving these balls within the race track at Happy Valley before 1889, the opinion of the Meeting was that attempts should be made to acquire land then in possession of the military in Kowloon. Rumsey had been elected captain of the new club and had secured the consent of the Governor – Sir William Des Voeux – to accept the presidency. Despite this influence at Court the military authorities could not be persuaded to become cooperative, and after some months the proposition had to be dropped. However, on 30 September 1889 permission was eventually obtained from Hong Kong Government to use ground at Happy Valley. Money was raised and work was started making the greens and tees. The architect of the course at Happy Valley was Captain (afterwards Colonel) H. N. Dumbleton R.E. The work progressed rapidly, and it is recorded that in May 1890 a match of six a side was played between the club and the 91st Regiment of the Argyle and Sutherland Highlanders, which the Club won easily.

In 1896, Captain Rumsey and Captain Dumbleton examined the possibilities of Deep Water Bay as a possible solution to the ever-increasing pressure from the ladies for extension of their very restricted privileges at Happy Valley as imposed by Commodore Boyes. Negotiations were opened with Government in June 1897 and with the not inconsiderable assistance of the Governor himself, Sir William Robinson, "the best friend the Club ever had", a lease of land for a small nine-hole course at Deep Water Bay was concluded with Hong Kong government in 1898.

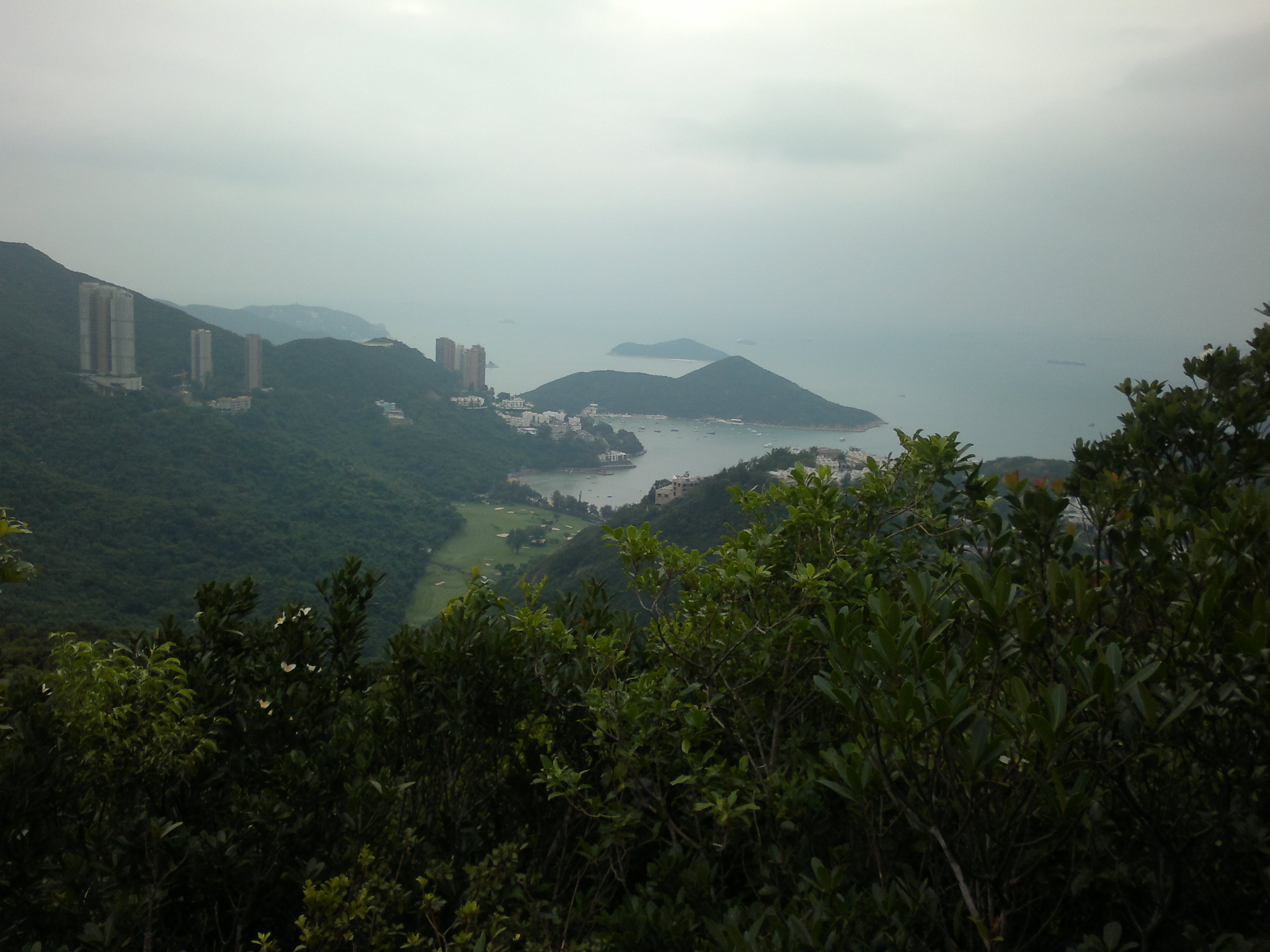
Deep Water Bay golf course

On 1 September 1897 as a result of a letter addressed to Queen Victoria's Lord Chamberlain the following reply was addressed to Sir William Robinson G.C.M.G. Governor of Hong Kong: "Sir, With reference to your dispatch of 20th July addressed to the Right Honorable The Lord Chamberlain, The Earl of Lothian, I have the honour to inform you that on your application being laid before The Queen, Her Majesty was graciously pleased, in view of your recommendations, to give Her permission to the Hong Kong Golf Club being called 'The Royal Hong Kong Golf Club'." This announcement was received with great acclaim and duly celebrated by a banquet at which Sir William was an honoured guest.

In 1903, the club obtained exclusive use of Happy Valley ground except for Wednesdays and Saturdays, when soccer and cricket were played. From the start, use by ladies was heavily restricted. And when the club gained exclusive use of Happy Valley in 1903, ladies were allowed to play on Sundays only.

In connection with this sharing of the ground at Happy Valley there is on record this remark made by the Captain at the Annual General Meeting of 1903 in connection with the playing of the final of the Club Championship at Happy Valley "The thanks of the Players are due to the Cricketers who so kindly stopped their game to let the Golfers through on each round."

The proximity of the Golf Course to the football ground on occasions lead to misdirected shots landing in the football arena but no one seems to have been hit. There was however one occasion when the late "Auntie" Maitland misdirected her drive from the 1st tee and caused serious injury to the eye of a Marine.

=== 1911–1945 ===
According to the club annals, "protracted negotiations" with the government and local farmers resulted in sufficient land being obtained in Fanling, its current location, to build its first full 18-hole course that was completed in 1911. The first idea was to use the Sun Wei valley but the Army Authorities opposed this. Messrs. T. S. Forrest, K. M. Cumming, L. S. Greenhill and M. A. Murray were appointed by the club to view this grazing land. Their report was enthusiastic and favourable. Negotiations with Government were opened (1908) for a lease of sufficient land for a full-size 18-hole course to be constructed. These negotiations with Government were protracted despite the club receiving a great deal of assistance from the Governor, Sir Henry May, in dealing with the local farmers in the matter of acquiring certain extra pieces of land considered essential by the course architects. It was said that E.R. Hallifax, the then Tai Po District Officer, was the man more than any other responsible for the construction of a course at Fanling golf course. The relationship of the District Officer with the village elders everywhere was avuncular or, indeed, almost paternal. In 1916, Sir Henry May arranged for the club to acquire additional land to form a Relief Course for the use of the Ladies.

At the time the Old Course was laid out, there were no trees at all on the course except down by the 3rd green and one or two near the clubhouse site. Much forestry work was undertaken during the period 1915–1919 but there was still very little to show yet except beautiful clumps of lilies and cannas on the hillsides. Grave mounds, or "pimples", as they were known, plus innumerable jars of human bones, existed on many of the fairways, but these were for the most part removed in 1920 as the result of a generous grant through Sir Henry May of $50,000, which was paid out as compensation to the families owning them. There was a particularly large number of the "jars" at the base of the "saddle" or, as it is known today, "Tommy Tucker" (derived from the Cantonese "Mm ta-ka (唔得㗎)" – don't strike). These jars unfortunately were in direct line from the tee and got broken one by one by duffed tee-shots. The penalty for picking out was one stroke but the picking was usually left to the caddie.

Trees were conspicuous by their absence, but then so was the grass on the fairways which were more rolled mud than anything else. This made the fairways very dusty especially on a windy day. The Greens were turfed with local grass, much of it 'cabbage', which made putting difficult whilst a great deal of trouble was constantly experienced from worms which fed upon the young fresh roots and didn't give the Green keepers a chance. The course was almost devoid all that there was a great deal of room for improving the original layout. The Committee appointed Mr. L.S. Greenhill to work out with Mr. Kerr (who had been general manager of the club since 1914 and resided in the Orme Bungalow) on a new lay out and new bunkering.

In 1919, a caddies union was discovered called "Po Tai Ngoi Yue" – Golf Caddies Club – which turned out to be a semi-triad society. The first caddie strike took place in April 1922 and was eventually settled.

On 2 November 1931, the New Course which had been designed by L.S. Greenhill some years before, was officially opened by Sir William Peel.

It was said that Sir William Peel, the Governor of Hong Kong in early 1930s, was a keen golfer. Little was allowed to interfere with his weekly round of golf or his regular rides with the Fanling Hunt. He rode hard, plunging across the terraced rice fields, bogging down at times in the waterlogged mud.

In 1933, George Bernard Shaw visited the club.

In 1936, Mr. Stanley H. Dodwell presented a "Captain's Chair" for the bar room to commemorate the disappearance of the last of the Pimples on the Old Course. Whenever the Captain is at Fanling and any other member or subscriber sits in the chair by mistake, the penalty will be one round of drinks at that particular table in memory of the departed pimples. It was fortunate that although this chair was looted during WWII, it was spotted being used as a Sedan Chair slung between two poles and recovered for the club.

=== 1945–1989 ===
During the 1950s, all the greens remodelled and planted with Gezira or Uganda grass. This grass has all come from a shoebox full of seeded soil taken from Uganda to Cairo during the war and one more sod of this grass was flown from Cairo to Hong Kong in 1951.

Sir Sidney Gordon, C.B.E., J.P., former President of the club, recalled his stopover at Cairo airport in 1951. "During the usual one-hour stopover and, as relations between the United Kingdom and Egypt were rather strained, the customs officer was somewhat suspicious of this damp, sackcloth-wrapped, parcel and insisted on it being opened. The contents made him even more suspicious but the intervention of the air crew enabled us to get it on board just before take-off."

By the end of 1956, the indebtedness of the club had been reduced to $40,000 – a reduction of $387,000 in eight years.

The first Hong Kong Open took place at the club in 1959.

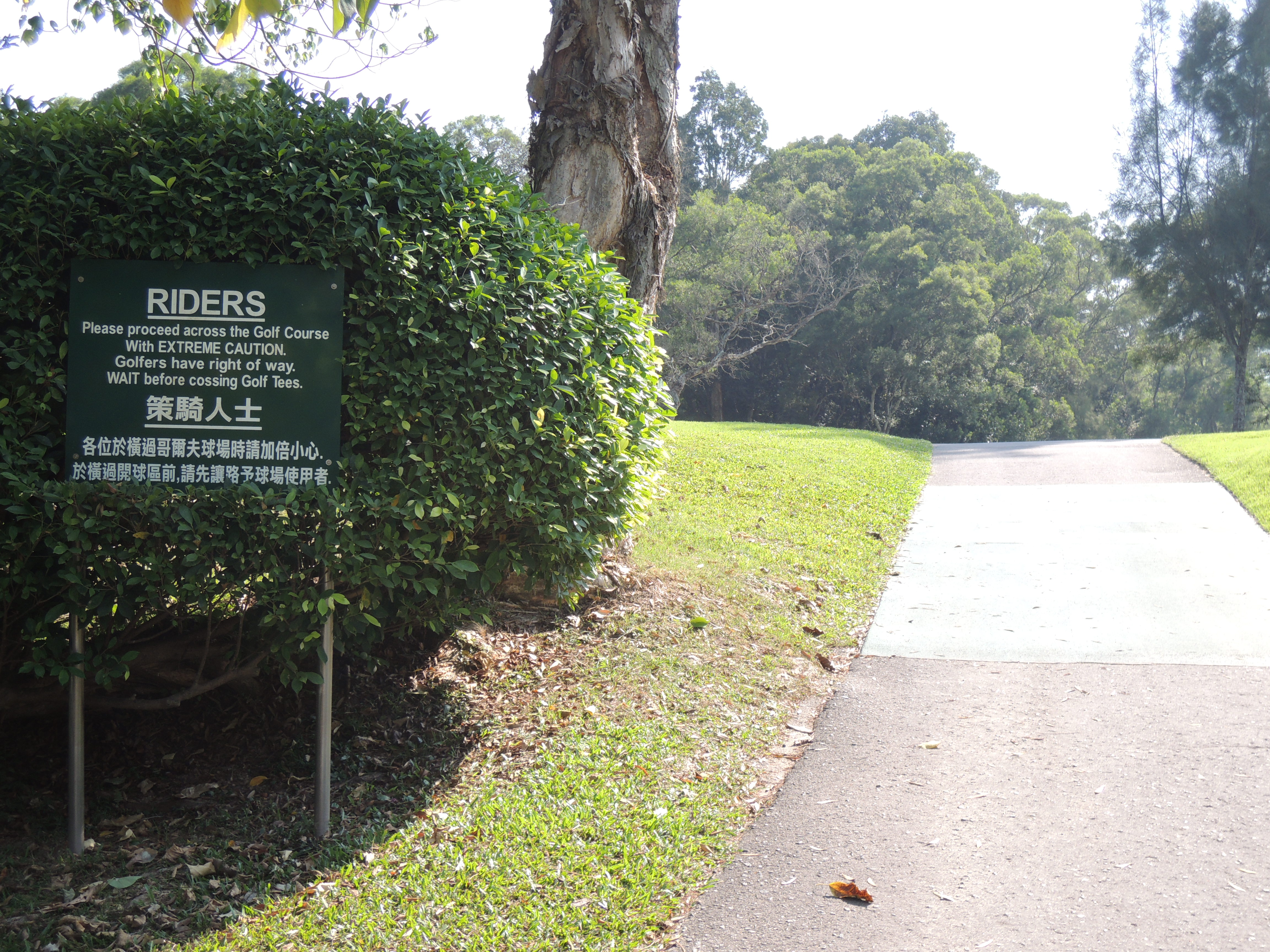
Riding Sign at Eden Course

Negotiations with the Jockey Club started in 1967 and, in due course, the Stewards of the Jockey Club agreed to recommend to their members that approximately 30 acres of land at Beas River, between the Jockey Club's West Paddock and Hang Tau Village Road, should be leased to the Golf Club. In return, the Golf Club would provide a 'ride' of about four or five miles, which would be laid out around the perimeter of the Golf Club property and would be available at all times for members of the Jockey Club. During the autumn of 1968, John Harris's proposals for the extension of the Eden Course were considered. The members approved expenditure of HK1.3 million on improvements to the Eden Course. On 10 October 1971, the 6,142-yard par-71 Eden Course was officially opened by Sir David Trench.

Sir David Trench, Governor of Hong Kong from 1964 to 1971, was keen on golf. He had insisted on his regular game of golf even during the political turmoils in late 1960s. In October 1968, Sir David Trench was pairing with Singapore Prime Minister Lee Kuan Yew to play a round of golf against Mr Gordon Macwhinnie, the club's Captain and Mr W.C. Choy at Fanling.

=== 1990–now ===
In 1996, in advance of the transfer of sovereignty over Hong Kong from the United Kingdom to the People's Republic of China, the club dropped 'Royal' from its name.

In 2015, the club celebrated its 125th anniversary by offering Hong Kong residents a special HK$125 green fee rate on selected days.

The first Hong Kong Ladies Open took place at the club in June 2015.

Tiffany Chan, a member of Hong Kong Golf Club, was qualified to play 2016 Summer Olympics. She finished for a four over total of 288 (71-75-73-69) and ranked 37 among the 60 players.

==== Public Housing ====
In 2018, after 5 months of public consultation, the Task Force on Land Supply recommended that land from the Fanling site be used for public housing. A land parcel of 32 hectares to the east of Fan Kam Road of the golf course, which is on the short-term tenancy, will be resumed by the government for housing development. In August 2022, shortly after the election of a new Hong Kong Chief Executive, the South China Morning Post reported that Legislative Council of Hong Kong member Regina Ip, also a member of the golf club, had called for the plans be abandoned; it was also reported that the club itself had been lobbying various groups in an attempt to overturn the plans on environmental grounds. In total, 7 of 16 members of the Executive Council have declared themselves members of the golf club, raising concerns of a conflict of interest. Executive Council member Ronny Tong also criticized the plan to build public housing on the course. In September 2022, the president of the Hong Kong Golf Club argued that it would not be cost effective to build public housing on the site. The Golf Club hosted an event with hundreds of dogs in an effort to rally public support against redevelopment of the land. Ta Kung Pao, a newspaper aligned with Beijing, said that "If the golf course development plan is thwarted, the public impression of 'business colluding with government officials' will only get worse."

John Lee has said that he respected the plan to build public housing.

In May 2023, after Hong Kong's environmental authority gave conditional approval for building public housing on part of the golf course, the Golf Club said "The approval... represents a great set-back to the city's efforts to enhance its liveability and combat climate change." In response, a member from Liber Research Community refuted the Golf Club's statement and said "If the ecological value or the environmental value of the land was so great, it does not make sense for it to be used as a golf course, as they use a lot of water and have been called 'toxic green', meaning a lot of agrochemicals are used for their upkeep."

In July 2023, after development chief Bernadette Linn confirmed the government planned to move forward with the plan to build public housing, the Golf Club applied for UNESCO recognition in order to block the government's plan. In addition, the Golf Club also filed a judicial review to the Court of First Instance.

In August 2023, the government offered to halt construction until legal proceedings were over; the Golf Club rejected the offer, with the Golf Club's lawyer saying the offer did not ensure that the public housing plan would be stopped.

In May 2024, the government's lawyer stated that the Golf Club had artificially inflated the number of moths found on the site, saying that "among the more than 700 moth species found by the club, around 300 actually were the same species."

In December 2024, Hong Kong's High Court overturned approval for 12,000 public housing units on the Fanling Golf Course, citing flaws in the environmental impact assessment from the Environmental Protection Department.

== President ==
The club has been led by a president since its founding in 1889. Due to war, financial ruin, and poor management, the list of presidents is not complete; the following list is a partial list.

=== List of presidents ===
1. Sir William Des Vœux, KCMG (1889–1891)
2. Sir William Robinson, KCMG (1891–1898)
3. Sir Frederick Lugard, GCMG (1911)
4. Sir Francis Henry May, GCMG (1912–1919)
5. A. G. Stephen (1921–1923)
6. A.H. Ferguson (1924)
7. E. R. Hallifax (1925)
8. Sir Gordon MacWhinnie, CBE (1983–1991)
9. L. C. K. Yung (1995–2001)
10. Dr. George Choa, GBS, CBE, KSt.J, JP (2001–2005)
11. H.C.H. Loh (2005–2009)
12. A.R. Hamilton (2009–2013)
13. M.K.T. Cheung (2013–2014)
14. Ronald Lu (2014–2019)
15. R.C.K. Lee (2020)
16. Peter Lam (current)

== Membership ==
In 1897, the club's membership reached 250.

By 1923, the club's membership reached 800.

In July 1964, it was decided to close the membership. All applicants, regardless of nationality, were put on the waiting list. The policy was to put the emphasis on giving membership to established golfers as opposed to beginners.

The club currently has 2,510 members, including 365 corporate nominee memberships.

=== St. George's v St. Andrew's ===
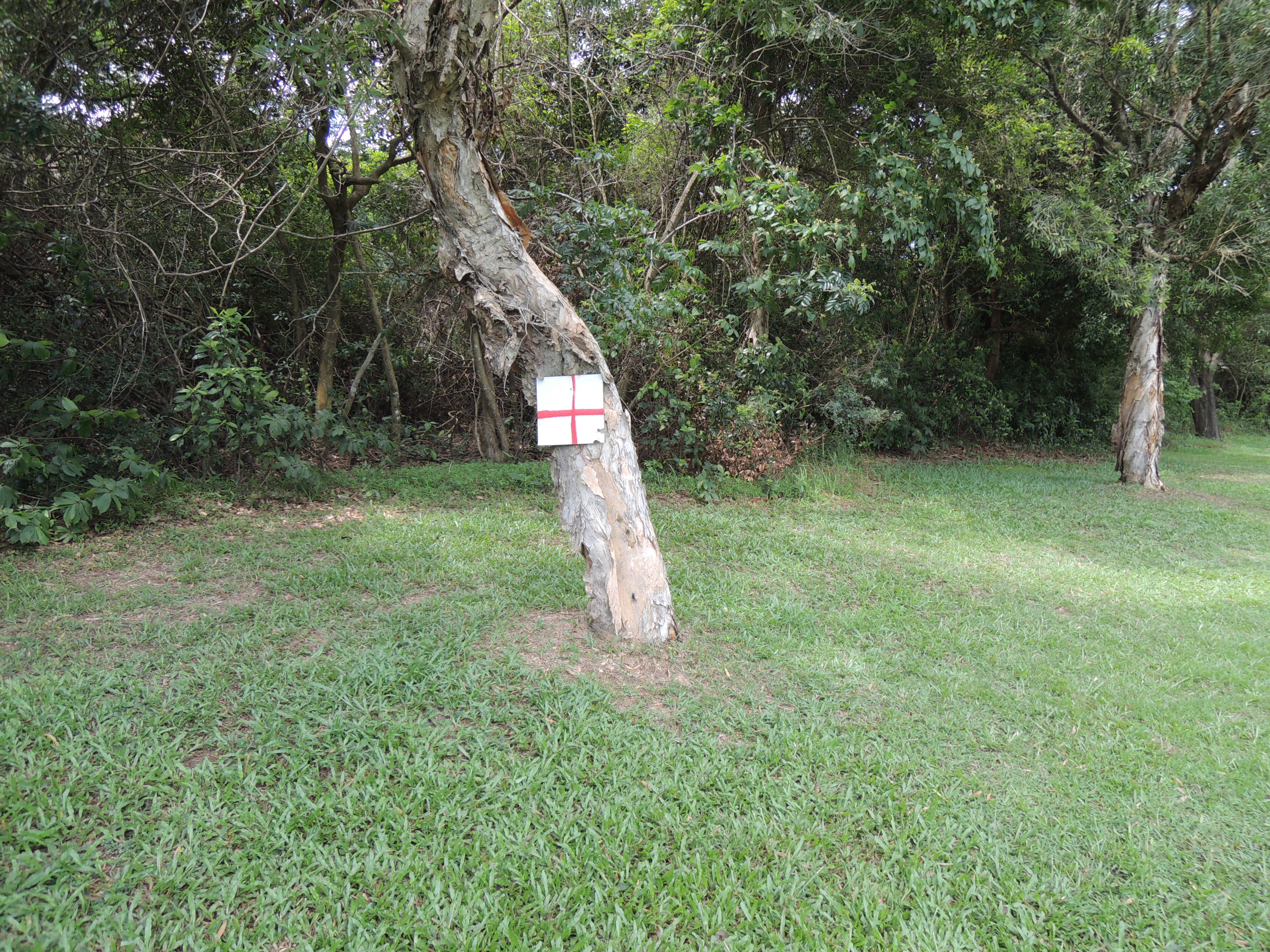
St George flag at Old Course

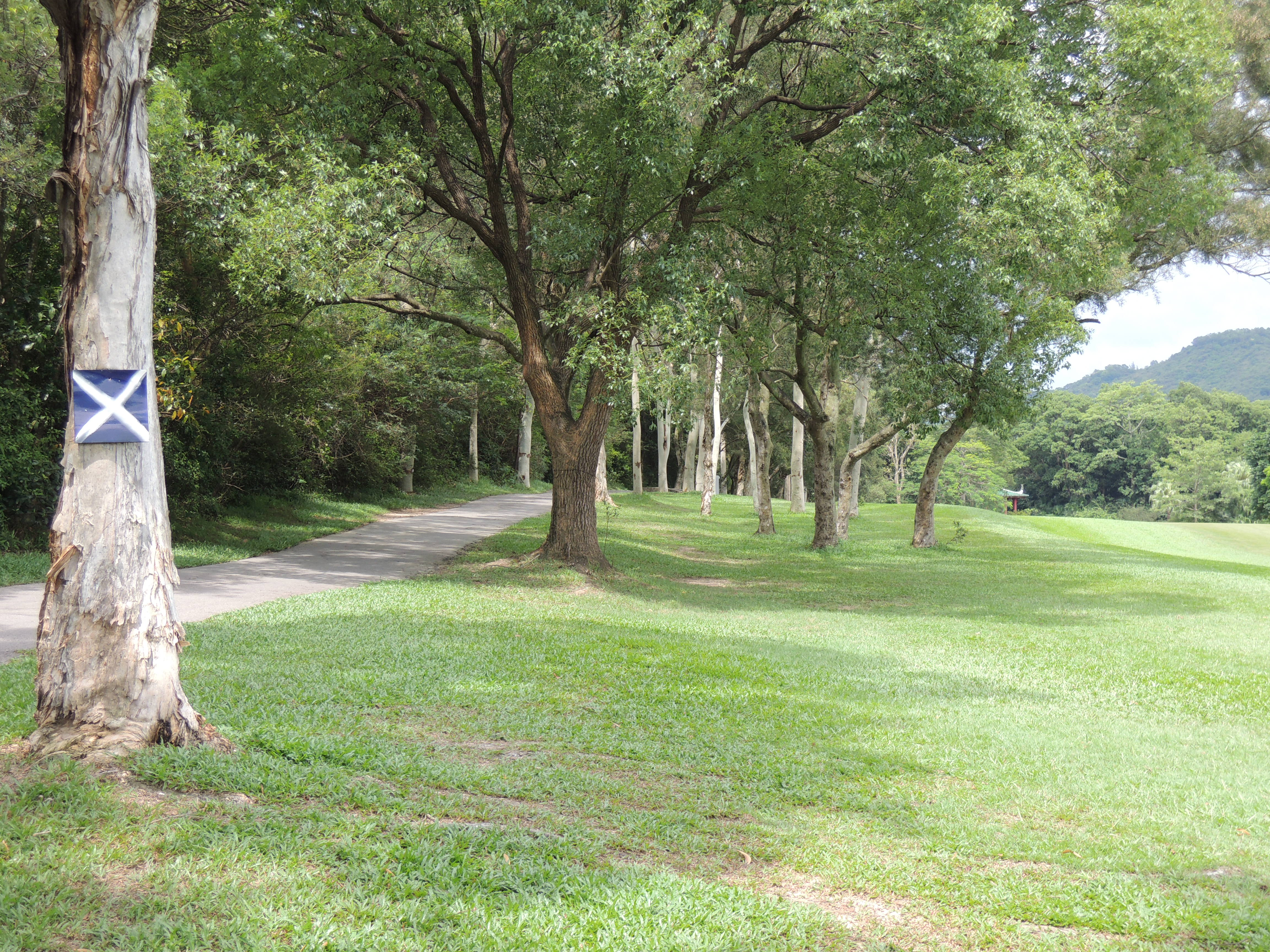
St Andrews flag at Old Course

Prior to 1921, there had been several matches of Scotland versus the Rest with usually very unsatisfactory results for the members of Scottish origin. In 1921, the first St. George's versus St. Andrew's Match was played in the month of January with, until 1926, a return match in December. After 1926, the December game was dropped probably due to the many other competition taking place in that month. Those playing for the Societies must be members of the club as well as members of one of the Societies. Entries are not limited except in so far as it is possible to pair off. The losing team in the morning Singles matches pays for lunch. The record of these matches are as follows:

Year	Winner	Year	Winner	Year	Winner	Year	Winner
1921	St. Georges	1926	St. Georges	1936	St. Andrews	1951	St. Georges
	St. Georges	1927	St. Georges	1937	St. Andrews	1952	St. Andrews
1922	St. Georges	1928	St. Georges	1938	St. Andrews	1953	St. Andrews
	St. Andrews	1929	St. Georges	1939	St. Andrews	1954	St. Georges
1923	St. Georges	1930	St. Andrews	1940	St. Georges	1955	St. Georges
	St. Georges	1931	St. Andrews	1941	St. Georges	1956	St. Georges
1924	St. Georges	1932	St. Georges	1947	N/A	1957	N/A
	St. Georges	1933	St. Georges	1948	N/A	1958	N/A
1925	St. Georges	1934	St. Georges	1949	N/A	1959	N/A
	St. Andrews	1935	St. Georges	1950	St. Andrews	1960	N/A

=== Debentures and nominee membership ===
After WWII, the Fanling property had badly suffered from general neglect which was understandable in the circumstances. The trees had been cut down for fuel and parts of the course including most of the greens had been used for vegetable cultivation. The New Course had been used for training and a large number of fox holes had been built. The clubhouse was requisitioned by the British Army after the war. The rehabilitation was as expensive as had been forecast. The Club not only spent all its account balances but had to arrange for an overdraft which at one time was over $400,000. (The price of daily newspaper in Hong Kong was 20 cents in 1947–48.) To reduce this liability a debenture issue was authorised on the basis of HK$500 per member. A few of the long established firms such as the Hong Kong Bank and Jardines also took up a number of the debentures to aid the club.

In 1963, an EGM was called and a Fanling Development Scheme was approved. Two resolutions were passed authorising the committee to proceed with a scheme for the extension of the Fanling clubhouse and the issue of debentures to the amount of HK$900,000 to cover the costs. A building levy of HK$5 per month for all members was also introduced. Actual and estimated capital expenditure on the improvement to the clubhouse totalled HK$1,214,000.

In early 1970s, to raise capital for the new complex, including the swimming pool and the mixed accommodation, a scheme of Nominee Memberships was introduced. On payment of HK$5,000 – soon raised to HK$10,000 – a firm became entitled, after approval by the club, to nominate an employee to membership. The Nominee Memberships were transferable, again subject to the club's approval, on payment of a commission to the club.

At the AGM in 1980, it was decided to issue 30 Nominee Memberships to meet the expense of a redevelopment scheme to include a swimming pool and squash courts in Deep Water Bay. The new building at Deep Water Bay was completed in early 1983 at a cost of about HK$25 million.

The financial problems were eventually overcome. Following many years of loss, a profit was reported in 1984 for the third year running. Since then, the club has remained in the black.

In 1986, 10 Nominee Memberships were issued in the price of HK$1.1 million to raise fund for the building of the automatic irrigation system, which piping secondary treated effluent from the sewage treatment plant belonging to one of those estates of the new town, Shek Wu Hui. This was the last time that the club issued Nominee Membership.

== Visitors and green fees ==
The club welcomes non-member Hongkongers on weekdays at HK$1,200 per round and HK$500 if they play after 3 pm. The number of rounds is unlimited The club offers practice sessions on the night range in 30-minute intervals from 6 pm until 11 pm seven days a week (including public holidays). These either start on the hour or half-hour allowing players unlimited use of range balls during these time periods. The night range fee for 60 minutes is HK$70 on weekdays and HK$100 on weekends and public holidays.

An agreement was formed where rural villagers could also play on some parts of the golf course for free, with one villager saying he had been allowed to do so for decades. Approximately 800 villagers were registered under the program.

== Facilities ==
Besides golf, the club offers swimming and tennis facilities, as well as restaurants and accommodation.

=== Happy Valley Club House ===
In 1896, the Club House was officially opened by Commodore Boyes. This Club House had been designed by Major Edward Albert Ram, entirely on a voluntary basis, as a keen golfer. It was built of stone with the main entrance facing the racecourse; lockers lined the walls and at one end there was a stone tablet recording the Club Champions since 1894. There was a Dressing room, bar and a caretaker's room. Mrs. Rumsey unfurled the club flag and as a special gesture a Ladies' competition was played after the opening despite the heavy rain which was falling. The women who played in this historic event were Mesdames O'Gorman, Dalrymple, Eccles, Boyes and Miss Boyes and Miss Gordon. The winner was Mrs. O'Gorman. A few months later, portraits of Sir William Des Voeux and Sir William Robinson were presented to the club and hung in the main entrance.

In 1918, the disastrous fire broke out in matsheds near the Club House at Happy Valley. The flames spread so rapidly that it proved impossible to save any of the club's records or stocks. Nothing but ashes.

From that date the club had been lent club room space once again by the Jockey Club but notice that this particular building was to be pulled down was given to the Golf Club at the end of 1928 and these rooms were consequently handed back to the owners in February 1929. The club decided to build a new club House at Happy Valley at a cost of HK$30,000 and this was duly completed in November 1930 and officially opened early in 1931.

After the World War II, the Club House had been thoroughly looted by the mobs during the hand-over interval as had every unoccupied residence in the Hong Kong and the club decided to surrender this property to Government for many reasons not the least of which was financial.

=== Deep Water Bay Club House ===
At the Annual General Meeting in 1898, it was decided to erect a single story Club House at Deep Water Bay and this was built in 1899. Major Edward Albert Ram, who designed the Happy Valley one, once more came to the club's aid as he had by that time become a partner of Messrs Dennison, Ram and Gibbs' architects.

During the war and after the fall of Hong Kong on Christmas Day 1941, Deep Water Bay was used by the Japanese for various purposes for the most part as a transport depot but they also built piggeries and these provided the excellent flagstones which now surround the south and east sides of the Club House. The rehabilitation of Deep Water Bay was not undertaken until 1947–48 when Frank Groves and Hector Mundy did an excellent job.

=== Fanling Club House ===
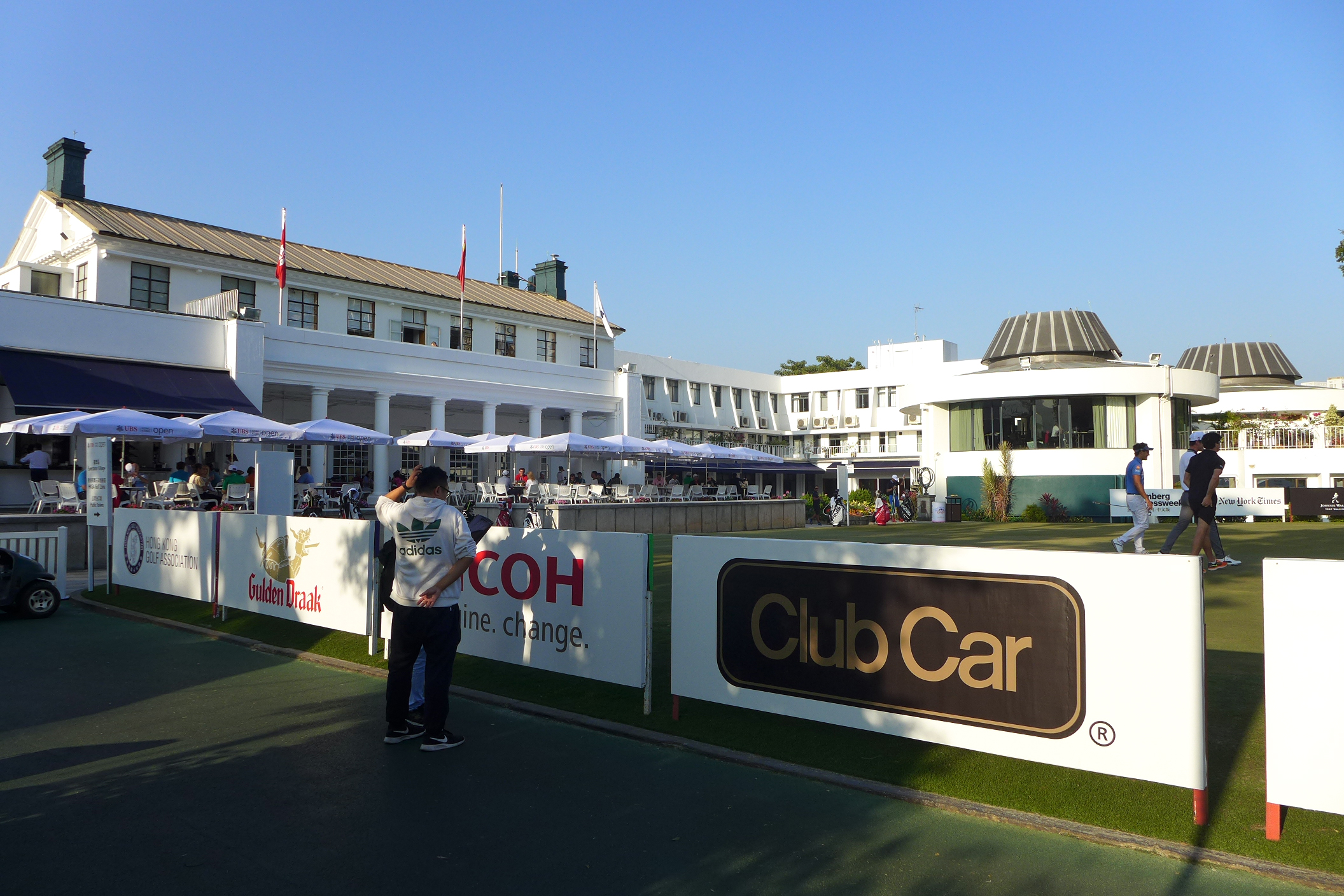
Fanling clubhouse

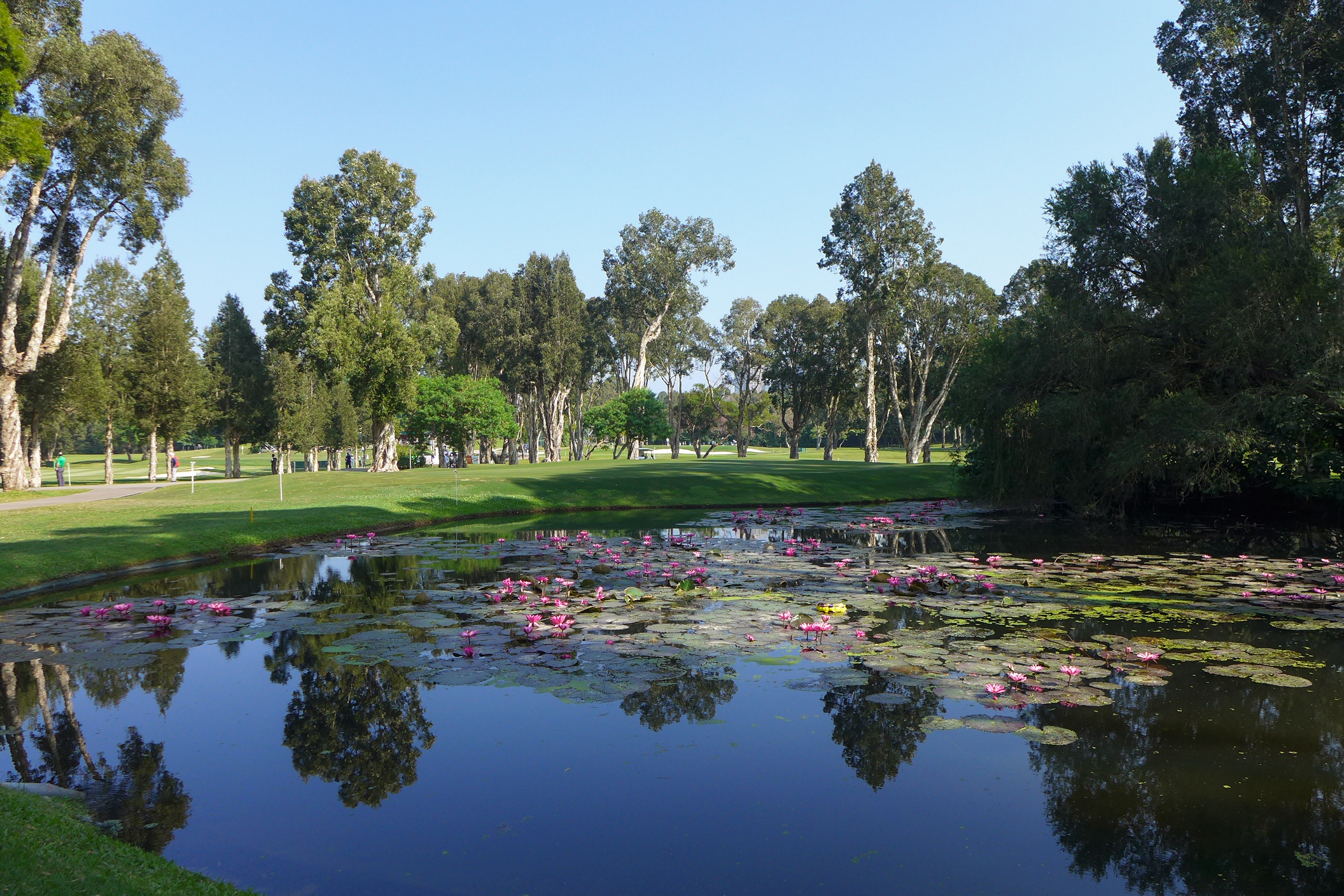
Lily Pond inside Hong Kong Golf Club

By 1911, the old course had been laid out and once more Edward Albert Ram of Messrs. Dennison, Ram & Gibbs designed the clubhouse, which was not however completed until 1914 and was originally known as the Dormie House.

=== Half Way House ===
The Half Way House at Fanling is a Grade III historic building. It is located on Fanling Golf Course. Inscriptions on a board over the entrance indicate that the building was erected in 1916 by Sir Henry May and T.S. Forrest Esq. Frank Hunter, Club Captain in 1950, donated money to form the garden at the Half-way House on the occasion of his retirement from Hong Kong. The pavilion is built in traditional Chinese Qing Vernacular style consisting of a partly open-sided structure formed of columns spaced at regular internals supporting a pitched and hipped Chinese tiled roof. One end of the pavilion has been enclosed to form a kitchen. The roof is decorated with curving end ridges to the hips, and a colourful ridge-board supporting two green dragons competing for the Pearl for Wisdom. Ornamental finials in the shape of fish, dripper tiles and a colourful eaves board complete the decorations to the roof which is supported on traditional Chinese roof trusses. The plinth is formed of unusual knapped stones. There are three flights of steps. The pavilion is a rare piece of Qing architecture. It was restored in 1998 and some alternations have been made.

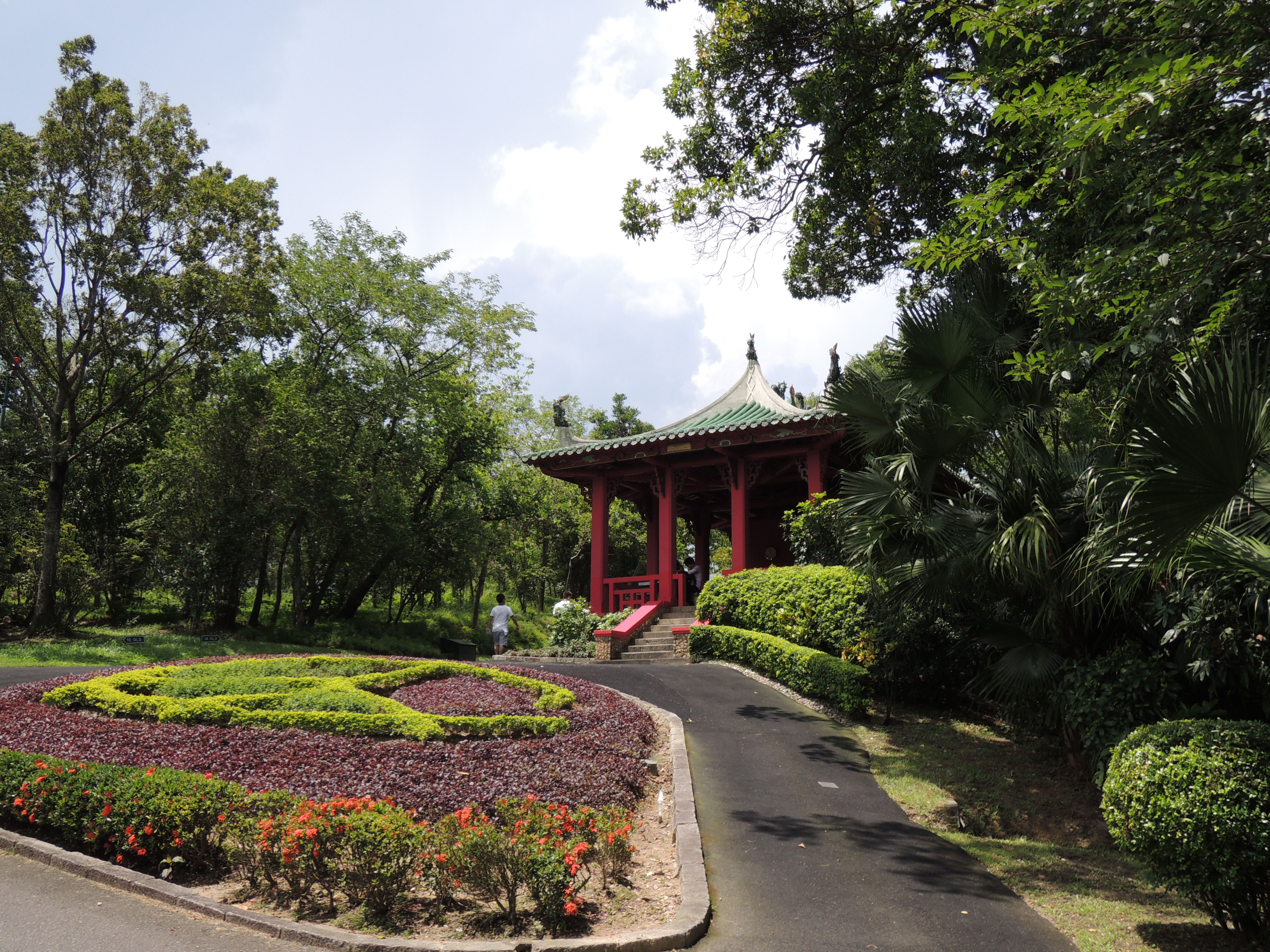
Half Way House

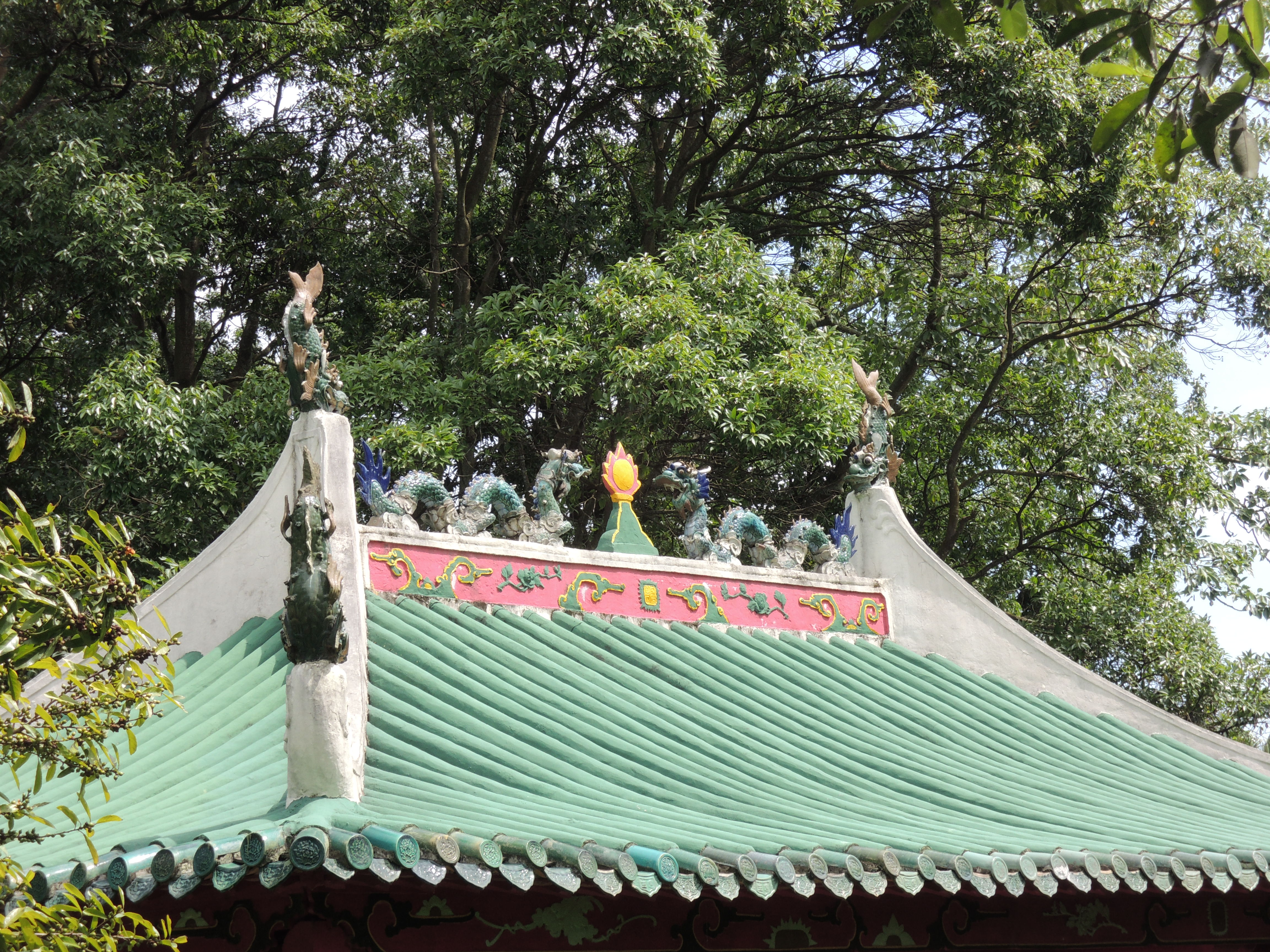
Roof of Half Way House

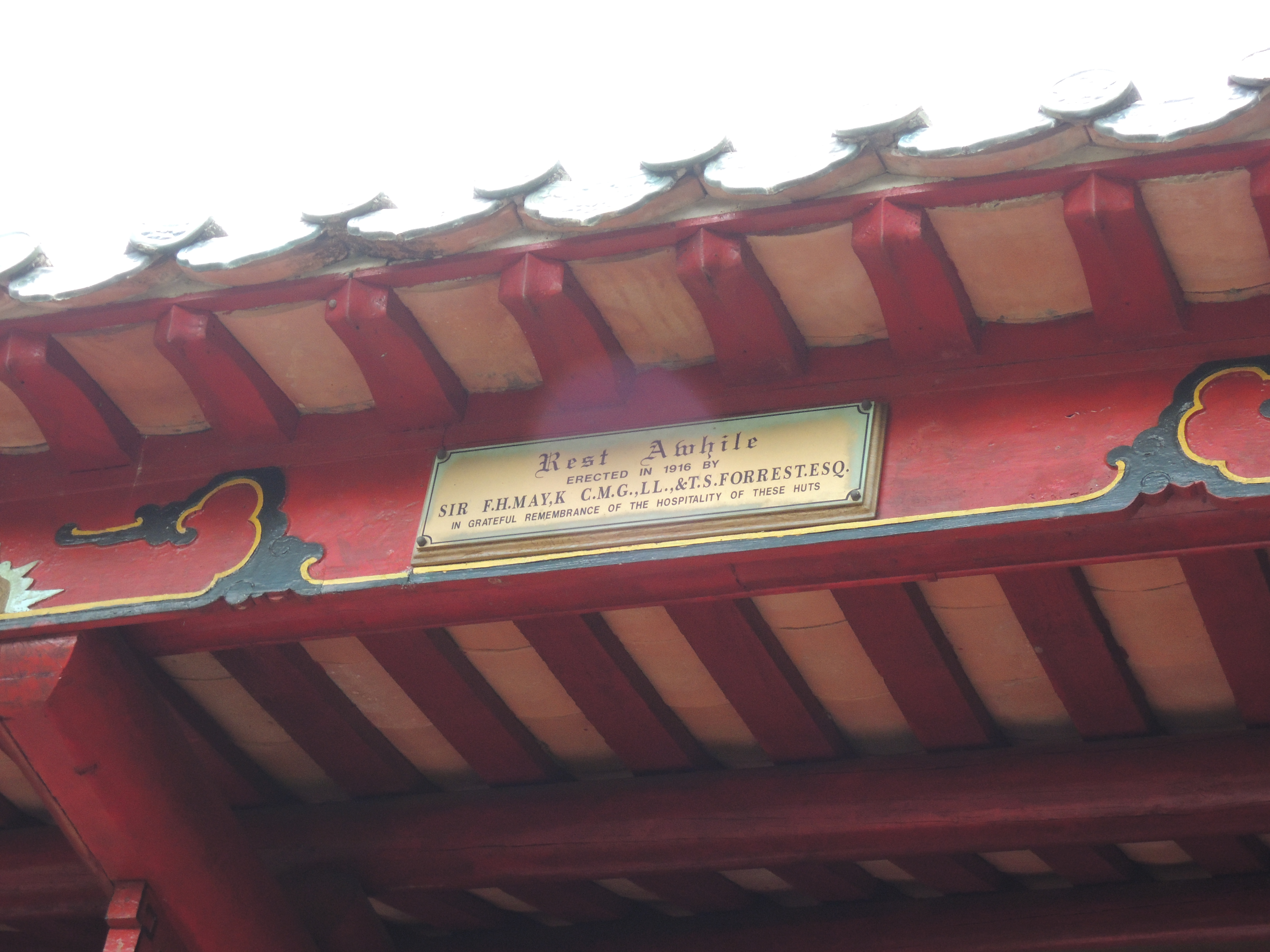
In the memory of Sir Henry May and T.S. Forrest Esq

=== Irrigation System ===
In 1980s, the club introduced the recycling of domestic waste water collected from Fanling town centre to use as irrigation – making the courses more playable in winter.

== Environmental Stewardship and Heritage Trees ==
According to the club's tree survey, there are nearly 100 different species of tree on the property including three species that are deemed by the Hong Kong Government as being Old and Valuable ones. Some of the tree species at Fanling include banyan, many of which are over 80 years old, eucalyptus (there are some particularly special examples of these by the right side of the 16th tee of the Old Course) as well as indigenous camphor trees, acacias, ironwoods, Norfolk pines and paper barks. In 2015, the club launched educational guided tours for local schools and organizations on specially designed tree trails over the three courses in Fanling. Besides, the club also announced to join the Audubon Cooperative Sanctuary Programme for Golf.

== Wildlife and Ecology ==
The Fanling golf course is around 44% forested, the rest consisting of road and fairway. The vegetation cover includes 75 hectares of mature lowland secondary forest, an extremely rare habitat in Hong Kong. The forest's age as well as its position on low-lying terrain has led to a high level of biodiversity. A survey from the Asia Ecological Consultants in 2018 logged over 150 bird species, over 30 reptiles and amphibians and 16 species of mammals. Collared scops owl, Pallas's squirrel, bamboo pit viper and common rose butterflies are commonly seen depending on the season and time of day. The golf course is home to several internationally endangered species such as Chinese pond turtle, Chinese swamp cypress，and freshwater crab species Somanniathelphusa zanklon which is endemic to Hong Kong and is threatened by the development of the course.

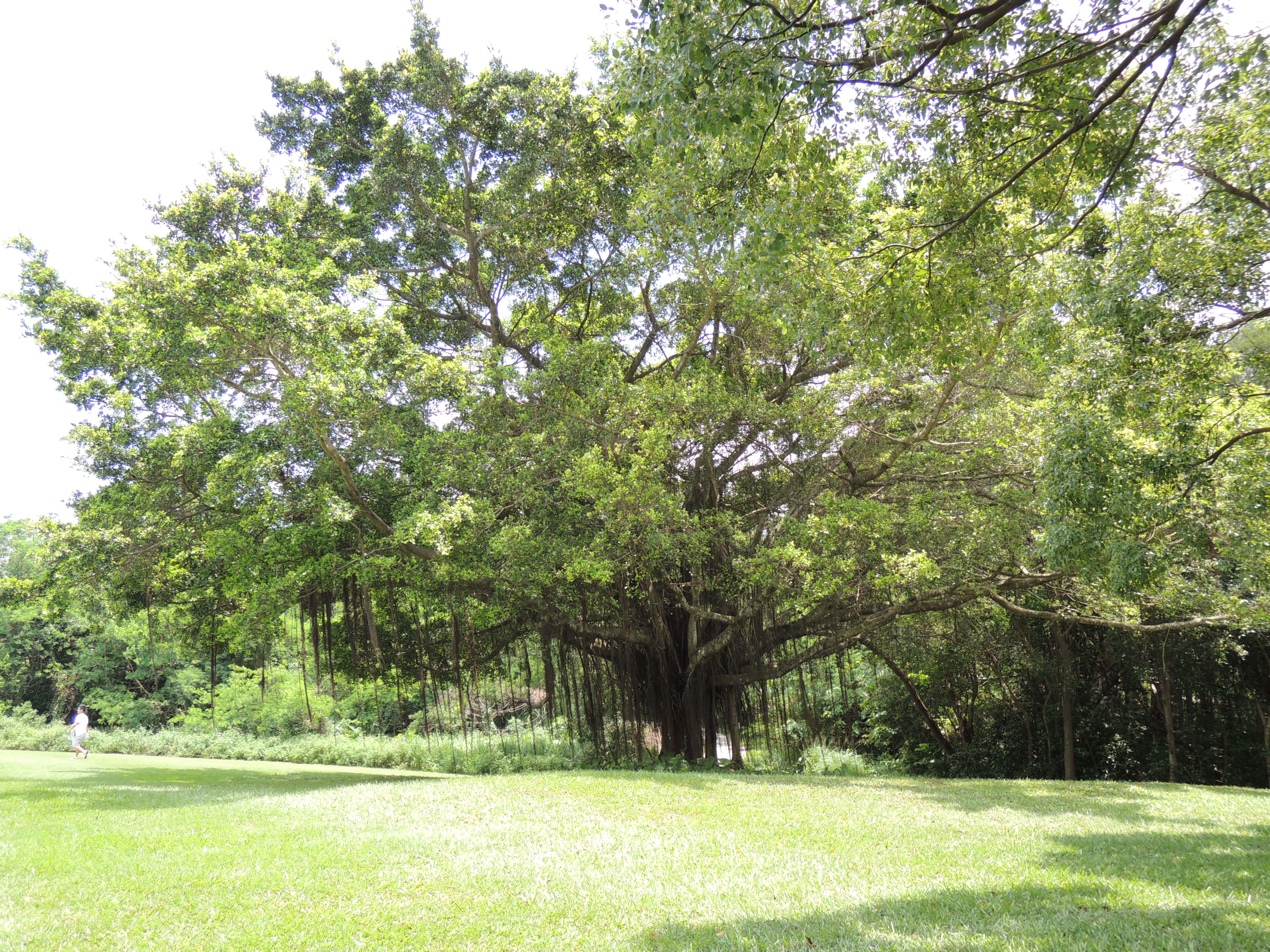
Banyan Tree near Hole 5

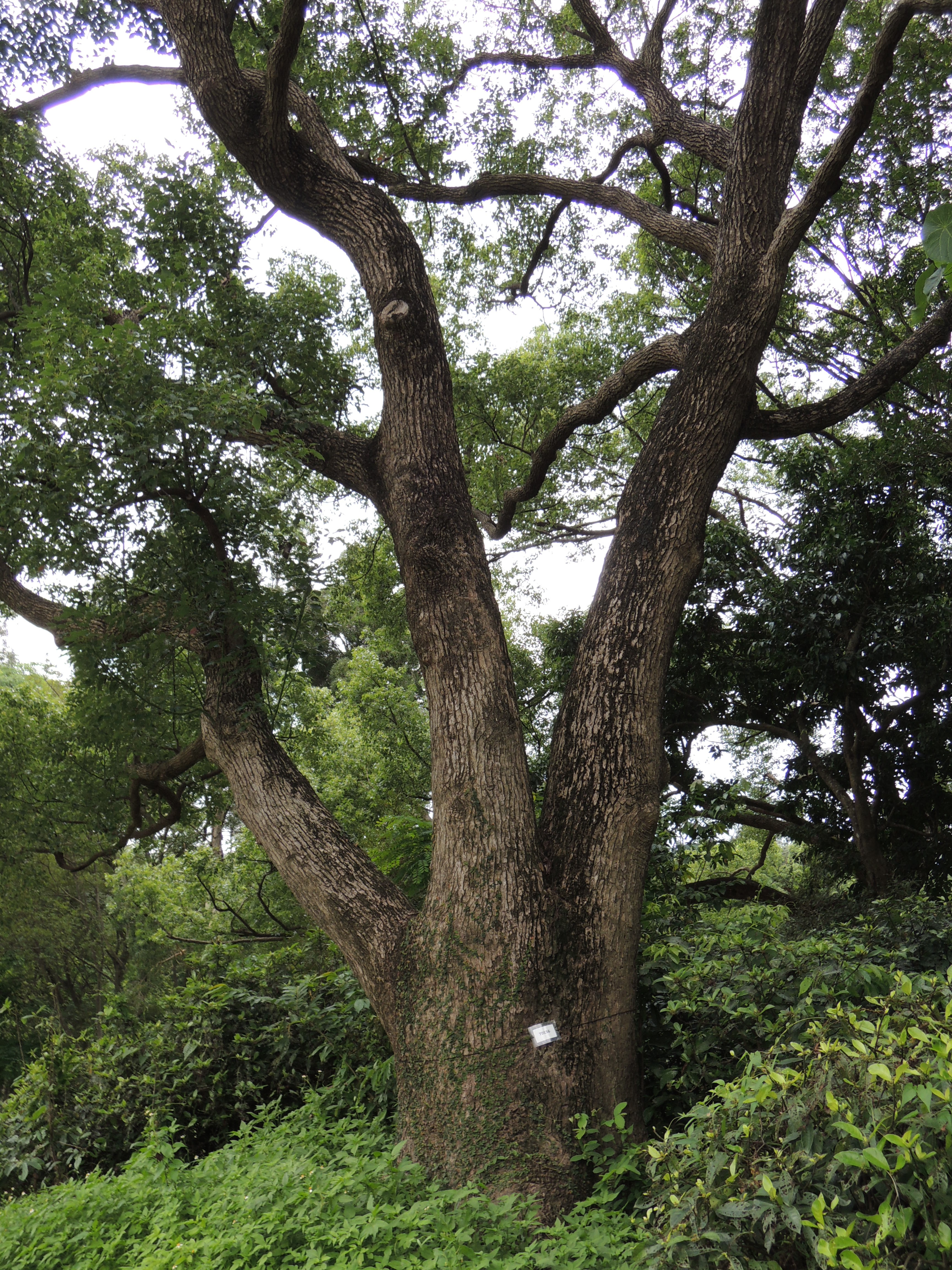
Camphor Tree near Hole 3

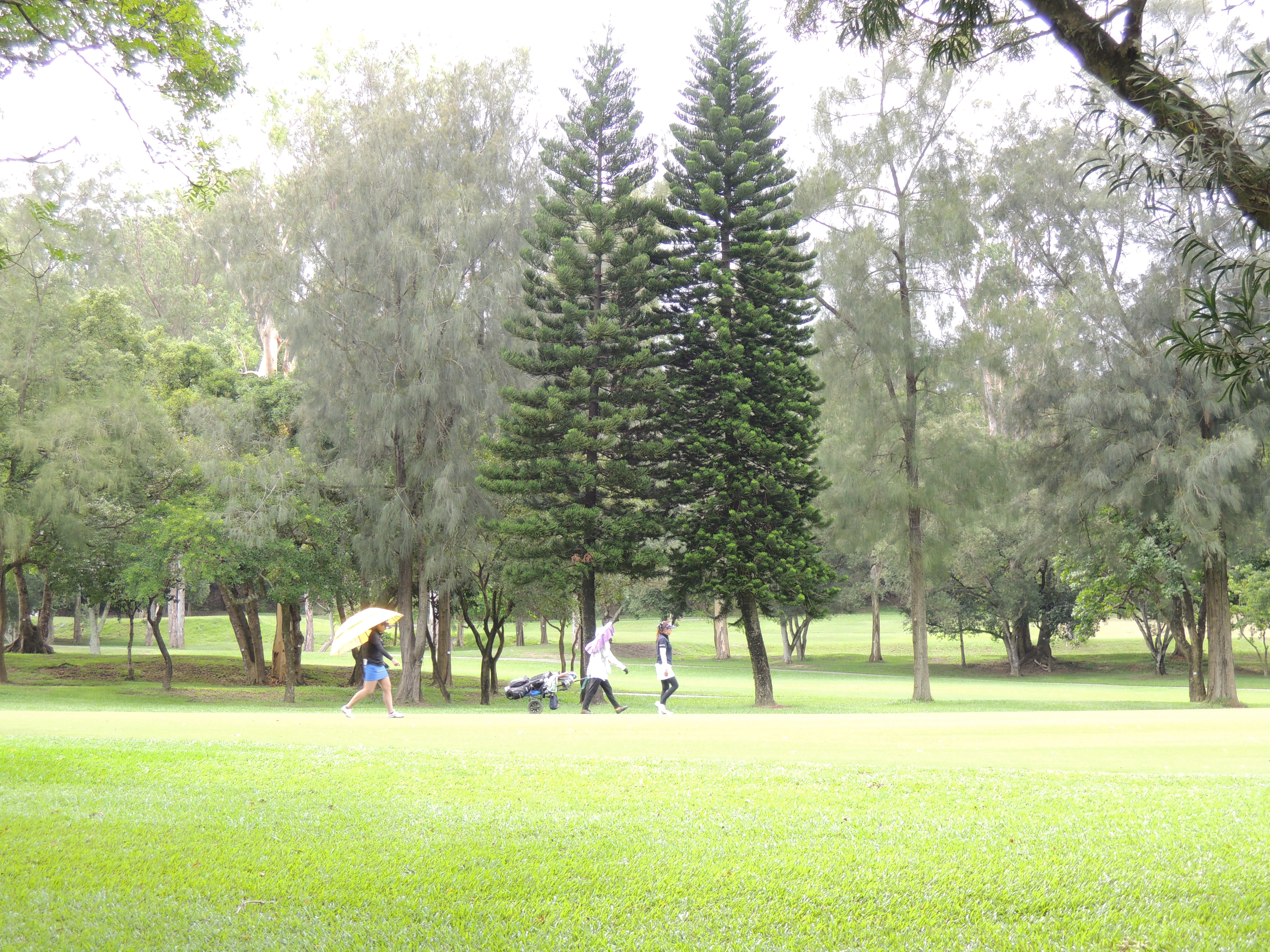
Norfolk pines near Hole 14

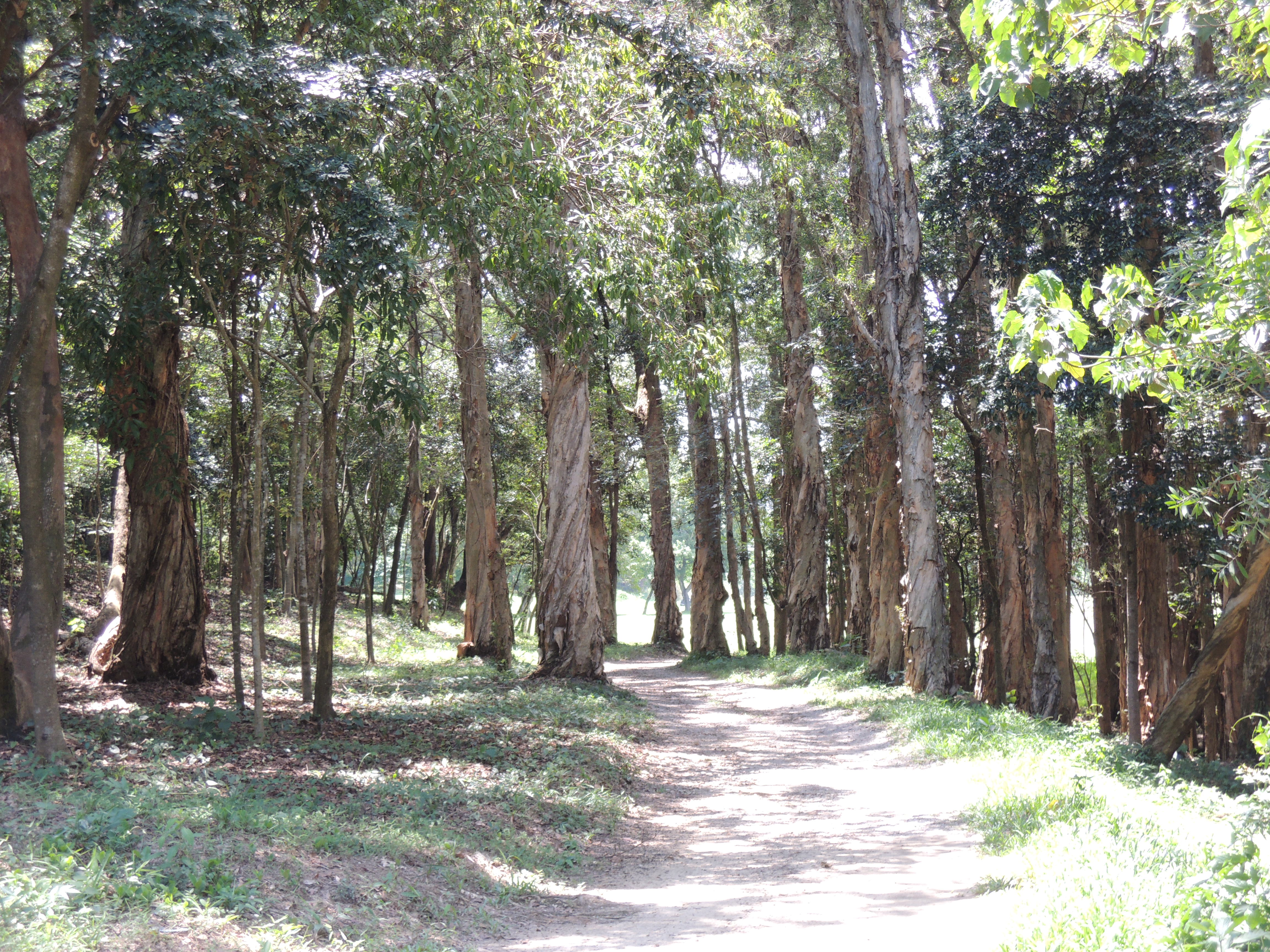
Paper Barks near Hole 9

== Tournaments hosted ==
- Hong Kong Open, 1959 to present
- LIV Golf Hong Kong, 2024
- Colgate-Hong Kong Open, 1976
- Johnnie Walker Classic, 1990
- Dunhill Cup – Asian Zone
- Eisenhower and Espirito Santo Trophies, 1984
- Queen Sirikit Cup 1990, 2001 & 2015
- Ageas HKPGA Championship 2014
- Hong Kong Ladies Open, 2015
- 2025 National Games of China 2025

== Charity events ==
Many charities hosted fundraising golf days at the club's courses, including the Community Chest, Po Leung Kuk and the Tung Wah Group of Hospitals. For example, in 2014 alone, golf events held at the club raised over HK$11.5 million for charity. Additionally, since 1987 the club has hosted its own charity golf event – the annual Cup of Kindness. Money was raised for the Sheung Shui-based Home of Loving Faithfulness, a residential care home for mentally and physically disabled young people; the Buddhist Po Ching Home for the Aged Women in Fanling and the Heep Hong Society, a multi-faceted children's training and therapy charity with centres across Hong Kong.

In addition, Chinese University of Hong Kong Golf Day has been held at Fanling since 2013.Hong Kong Baptist University held its golf day in 2004, 2005, 2006, 2007, 2008, 2010, 2012 & 2014.

=== The Community Chest Charity Golf Day ===
Community Chest has held its golf day at Fanling since 1999. From 1999 to 2009, DHL Express was the title sponsor.

Since 2010, Bank of China (Hong Kong) has become the title sponsor of the golf day. The participants concerted efforts helped render tangible support to the Chest's member agencies in providing a wide range of supportive and integrated services for the Mentally ill and Ex-mentally ill. From 2010 to 2015, the event raised from HK$1.6 million to HK$1.8 million. In 2016, the Bank of East Asia acted as title sponsor of the tournament and raised HK$2.3 million.

Year	Amount Raised	Teams	Participants
Community Chest DHL Charity Golf Day
1999	HK$1,100,000	45	N/A
2000	HK$1,100,000	45	N/A
2001	HK$1,000,000	46	N/A
2002	HK$1,556,000	58	N/A
2003	HK$1,645,000	59	N/A
2004	HK$1,457,000	55	220
2005	HK$1,378,000	50	200
2006	HK$1,493,000	50	N/A
2007	HK$1,573,500	49	200
2008	HK$2,692,000	79	320
2009	HK$1,486,890	44	170
Community Chest BOCHK Charity Golf Day
2010	HK$1,725,960	49	200
2011	HK$1,802,800	50	200
2012	HK$1,653,600	47	190
2013	HK$1,617,644	47	190
2014	HK$1,630,097	47	190
2015	HK$1,400,000	41	160
Community Chest BEA Charity Golf Day
2016	HK$2,300,000	48	190

== See also ==
- List of golf clubs granted Royal status
- Fanling Lodge
- Oi Yuen Villa
