= Kwu Tung =

Kwu Tung 古洞
- Area
- Location within Hong Kong
- Coordinates: 22.504656°N 114.103769°E
- Country: China
- Provincial-level SAR: Hong Kong
- Region: New Territories
- District: North District
- Time zone: UTC+8 (HKT)

Kwu Tung
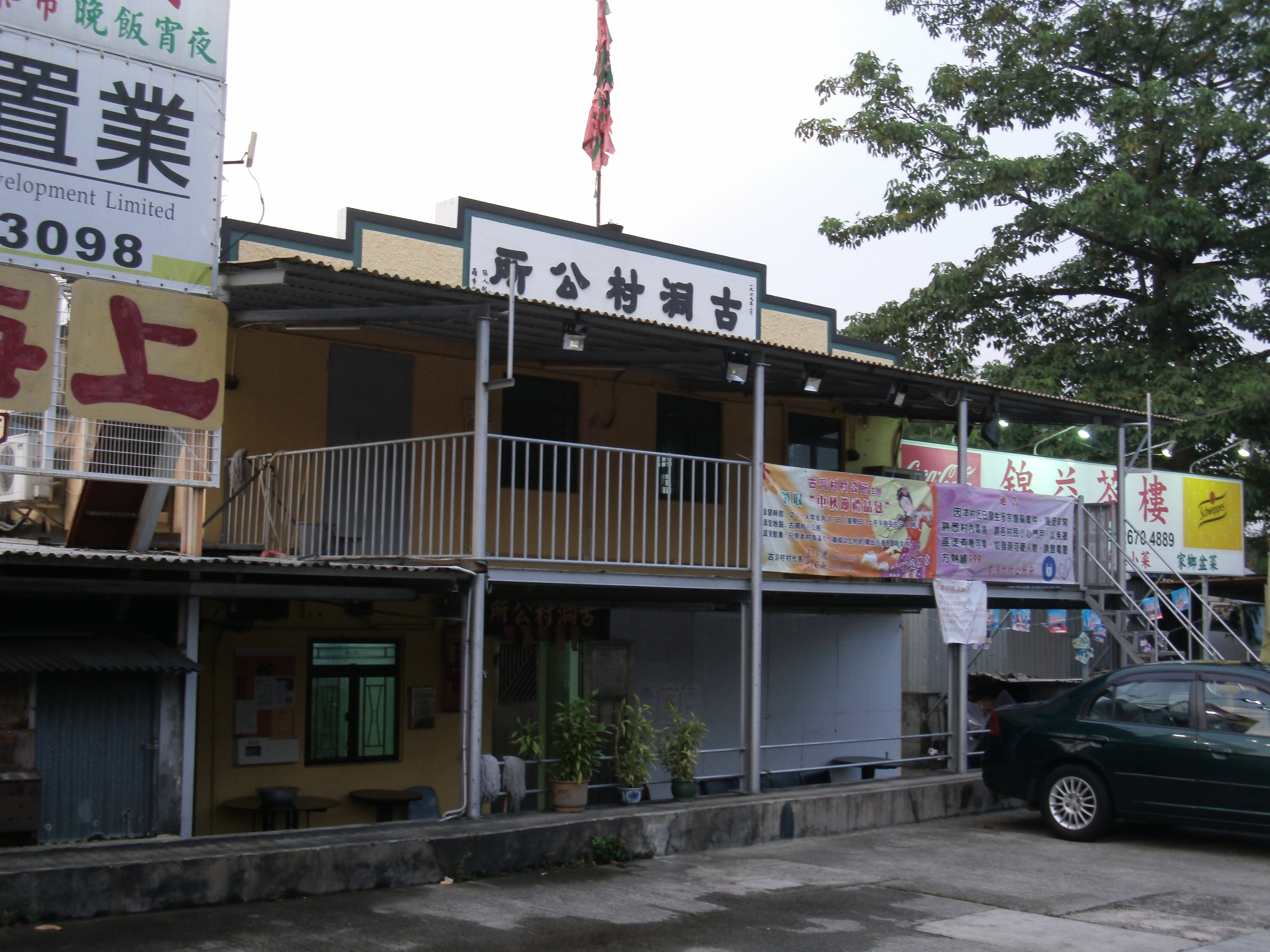
- Kwu Tung village office
- Chinese: 古洞
Transcriptions
Standard Mandarin
- Hanyu Pinyin: Gǔdòng
Yue: Cantonese
- Yale Romanization: Gú duhng
- Jyutping: Gu2 dung6

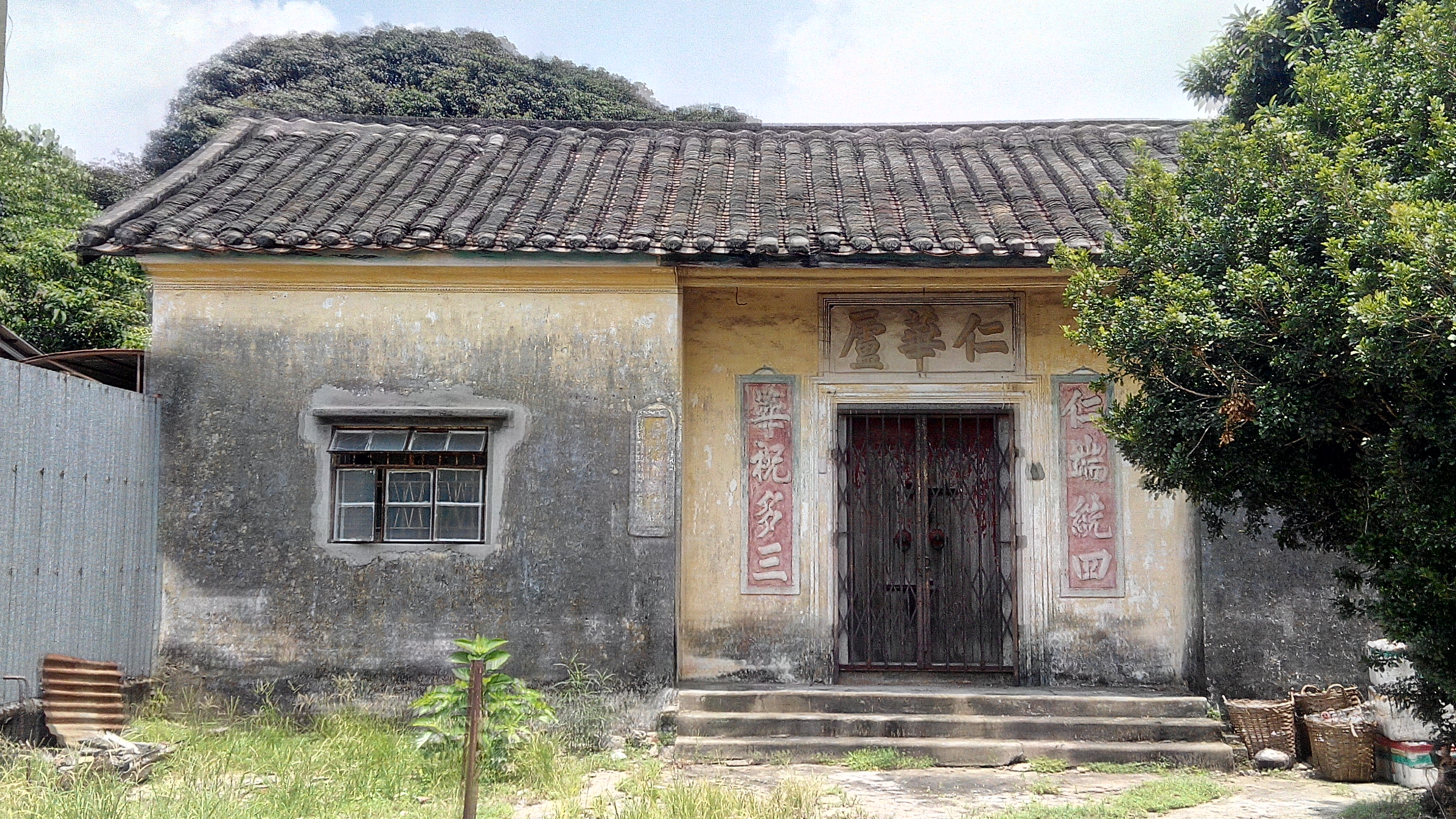
Yan Wah Lo was built in 1933 by members of the Yeung clan who had made their fortune in Indonesia.

Kwu Tung (Chinese: 古洞) is an area in the northern New Territories, west of Sheung Shui and Fanling, and east of Lok Ma Chau and San Tin, in Hong Kong.

== Administration ==
For electoral purposes, Kwu Tung is part of the Sheung Shui Rural constituency of the North District Council. It is currently represented by Simon Hau Fuk-tat, who was elected in the local elections.

== History ==
Kwu Tung literally means "old cave" in the Cantonese language. Tung (洞 or 峒) also indicates that it was the habitat of ancient native Cantonese people. These inhabitants were later replaced by Punti, Hakka, and a small number of Teochew people, and the newcomers became the indigenous inhabitants of Hong Kong. Residents in Kwu Tung are mainly farmers.

== Geography ==
With the sediment of Sheung Yue River and creeks nearby, the land of Kwu Tung is relatively plain compared to the rest of hilly Hong Kong.

== Development ==
Kwu Tung North is one of three new development areas currently being planned for North District, in parallel with Fanling North and Ta Kwu Ling, as part of the North East New Territories New Development Areas Planning by the Hong Kong SAR Government.

The planned new town includes residential, commercial and community developments, a public transport interchange and a railway station along the existing Lok Ma Chau Spur Line component of the East Rail Line.

Construction of the future Kwu Tung Station is scheduled to commence in 2023 with forecast completion in 2027, and is expected to be followed by subsequent expansion to accommodate the planned Northern Link railway connection to Kam Sheung Road Station.

== See also ==
- Kwu Tung station
- Oi Yuen Villa
