= North East New Territories New Development Areas Planning =

The Hong Kong 2030: Planning Vision and Strategy (HK2030 Study) is a study group tasked with preparing a strategic land use planning framework for Hong Kong up to year 2030. The HK2030 Study aimed to provide strategic framework for future land use in New Territories to address long-term housing demands in the New Development Areas (NDAs) of Kwu Tung North (KTN) and Fanling North (FLN). In 2008 "The North East New Development Areas Planning and Engineering Study" (NENT NDAs Study) began; it continued until 2013.

There were four primary objectives of this study group:

- Determine strategic roles of the NDAs
- Build people-oriented communities
- Create sustainable living environments
- Develop appropriate implementation mechanisms.

Industries such as special industries, research and development, creative industry, business, education, and medical care were emphasized in the developmental project.^{^{[5]}} The project was controversial with opponents questioning the need and intention of the project, zoning areas, compensation, and environmental preservation ^{^{[6]}}. The latest revision of NENT was passed by the Executive Council in 2013^{^{[7]}} and was passed by the Legislative Council for budget approval in 2014.^{^{[8]}}

== Policy content ==
Kwu Tung North and Fanling North are planned to provide 60,700 new flats accommodating 174,900 people with a ratio of public to private housing of 60:40. A population of 460,000 can be housed until the planning's completion.^{^{[9]}}

Due to its distance from central Hong Kong, the government concentrates residences, workplaces, and public facilities within 500 m of the public transport nodes, railway stations, and highways. An integrated pedestrian and cycle track network will serve to increase traffic convenience. A ‘Commercial, Research and Development Cluster’ will be developed to create synergy with Lok Ma Chau Loop, and it is estimated that there will be 37,700 job opportunities created.^{^{[10]}}

The areas are designed to be environmentally friendly with the use of green building design and electric vehicles encouraged.^{^{[11]}}In long-term consideration, Long Valley will be preserved as a nature park to compensate for the wetland loss due to the New Development Areas (NDAs). Two pieces of land located at the north and south of the park are reserved for agricultural purposes for farmers to purchase or rent.^{^{[12]}}

A special ex gratia compensation has been devised for affected qualified households to assist their removal. A public rental-housing site is reserved for rehousing.^{^{[13]}}

== Timeline of development ==
=== 1998–003 ===
NENT Study was conducted in between 1998 and 2003 to assess its development potential for strategic growth.^{^{[14]}} Ping Che/Ta Kwu Ling, FLN, and KTN were identified as suitable NDAs.^{^{[15]}} The NDA proposals were shelved when population growth slowed and housing demand fell.^{^{[16]}}

=== 2007–2008 ===
NENT NDAs development was proposed in 2007–2008 Policy Address. This plan targeted the integration with the Pearl River Delta's development and the generation of employment opportunities in the Six Industries.^{^{[17]}}

In June 2008, PlanD and CEDD worked on NENT NDAs Planning and Engineering Study which involved three-stage public engagement:^{^{[18]}} Stage One Public Engagement ("PE1"), ^{^{[19]}} Stage Two Public Engagement ("PE2")^{^{[20]}}and Stage Three Public Engagement ("PE3").^{^{[21]}} The study's findings were publicized through newspapers advertisements, posters, invitation letters and a study website.^{^{[22]}}

=== November 2008 – February 2009 ===
PE1 consisted of 16 briefing sessions and a community workshop.^{^{[23]}}The public were engaged in focus group discussions on four topics: implementation mechanisms, people-oriented communities, strategic roles of NENT NDAs, and sustainable living environment.^{^{[24]}}

In November 2008 briefing sessions were arranged with the Town Planning Board (TPB), the Development Panel of the Legislative council, and the Planning Sub-committee of Land and Building Advisory Committee (LDAC).^{^{[25]}} Briefings on NENT NDAs proposal were delivered at the Joint Co-operation Meeting between the Planning Department, Shenzhen Municipal Planning Bureau, and 12th Beijing – Hong Kong Economic Co-operation Symposium.^{^{[26]}}Briefing sessions were also arranged for the Hong Kong Institute of Planners, the Real Estate Developers Association of Hong Kong, Heung Yee Kuk New Territories (Heung Yee Kuk), and the Advisory Council on the Environment (ACE) in December 2008 and January 2009.^{^{[27]}} Upon invitations, the study team attended meetings held by North District Council ("NDC") and RCs in four districts including Sheung Shui, Fanling, Ta Kwu Ling, and Sha Tau Kok. ^{^{[28]}} The study team met residents and concerned groups from the Kwu Tung area and Fanling North Area including Ling Shan, Tin Ping Shan Tsuen, Ma Shi Po, and Shek Wu San.

A three-hour community workshop for the public was organized by PlanD and CEDD at Luen Wo Hui Community Hall in Fanling on December 20, 2008.^{^{[29]}} Expert Panel Members introduced four focus topics of the NDA's study before allowing group discussions of the topics.^{^{[30]}} Approximately 200 people attended the workshop. Many of the attendees were local residents, members of NDC, RCs, and representatives from relevant organizations like PlanD, Ma Shi Po Environmental Concern Group, and Chinese YMCA of Hong Kong.^{^{[31]}}

Over 90 individual written comments were collected until March 2009. A general support for ecological conservation was found from the feedback.^{^{[32]}}

=== Mid-November 2009 – mid-January 2010 ===
PE2 involved 17 briefing sessions and 1 public forum for soliciting opinions on the Preliminary Outline Development Plans.^{^{[33]}}Some exhibition panels were set up to introduce the study.^{^{[34]}}

Local committees and professional organizations met with the Green Group representatives and North District Secondary School Principals who gathered their opinions.^{^{[35]}} There were 4 local meetings with over 300 villagers held on November 29, 2009 and January 23, 2010.^{^{[36]}} These participants came from Kwu Tung Village, Fu Tei Au Village, Ling Shan Tsuen, Shek Wu San Tsuen, Tin Ping Shan Tsuen and Ma Shi Po.^{^{[37]}}

On December 12, 2009, a public forum was organized to obtain public opinions on proposals at Luen Wo Hui Community Hall.^{^{[38]}} About 500 people attended the forum including local residents, relevant NDC and RC Members, and representatives from relevant parties and organizations.^{^{[39]}}

The study team received more than 250 written comments until March 2010.^{^{[40]}}The development proposals were refined after taking into account the public comments and recommendations on technical assessments obtained from PE1 and PE2.^{^{[41]}}

=== Mid-June and September 2012 ===
PE3 was launched to gauge public opinion on the Recommended Outline Development Plans.^{^{[42]}}Roving exhibitions were organized at North Point, Sha Tin and the North District Government Offices.^{^{[43]}}Engagement activities included 35 briefing sessions, 1 public meeting, and 1 public forum.

The study team remained work closely with aforementioned agencies, Housing Authority, relevant local committees, professional bodies, and other stakeholders such as green groups.^{^{[44]}}

On July 29, 2012, a public meeting which 600 people participated in was held in Kwun Tung North. ^{^{[45]}} A public forum organized on September 22, 2012 was also attended by more than 5,000 people.^{^{[46]}} On December 9, approximately 100 local residents opposed the plan and marched to Henderson Land's headquarter^{^{[47]}}. Over 10,000 written comments were received by the end of 2012. ^{^{[48]}}

=== October 2012 – 6 October 2014 ===
After completion of the study in July 2013, NENT NDAs proposal was restated in the 2013 Policy Address.^{^{[49]}}On May 2, 2014, a motion allocating $340.8 million for advancing infrastructure work at KTN FLN NDAs was proposed.^{^{[50]}} Affected residents and activists stormed the Legislative Council building over the plan while pan-democrats filibustered over the bill.^{^{[51]}}On June 27, the motion was passed in Legislative Council^{^{[52]}}when most pan-democrats did not cast their votes.^{^{[53]}}The final report of the study was released in July 2014^{^{[54]}} and the government launched a new website for KTN FLN NDAs on October 6, 2014.^{^{[55]}}

== Opinion ==
=== Approbation ===
==== Increase housing supply ====
The expansion of new towns, supported by the pro-Establishment, will provide a large number of housing to solve the growing housing problem, which severely affects the quality of life in Hong Kong, slowing down economic progress and development. ^{^{[56]}} The plan will shorten the waiting time for public rental housing, which currently stands at 4.1 years. ^{^{[57]}}

=== Improve the areas’ living environment ===
Helps to resolve the problems brought by industrial land and open warehouses to improve life quality of local residents. In addition, rehousing moves squatting inhabitants to public housing.^{^{[58]}}

==== Economic development ====
The ‘Commercial, Research and Development Cluster’ acts as a driving economic force in the areas; it creates job opportunities to local residents. The plan facilitates the interaction between Hong Kong and Shenzhen in cultural and economic aspects which bring strategic interest to Hong Kong.^{^{[59]}}

==== Create a sustainable, environmentally-friendly community ====
Cleans up current polluted lands and preserve Long Valley in the long run.

=== Criticisms ===
==== Undemocratic policy-making process ====
During the initial stage of consultation, the government only invited Heung Yee Kok registered organizations, and government-affiliated committees to the meetings. The local residents and the general public were not represented.^{^{[60]}} The government later organized forums, but those only serve to present the policy proposal and there was no deliberation or negotiation between the government and attendees.^{^{[61]}} Responding to this, fifty thousand submissions opposed to the policy were submitted to Town Planning Board (TPB)^{^{[62]}} and many protests followed. In spite of strong opposition, the government bypassed the TPB to apply for an appropriation to Financial Committee, legislative council (LegCo). This incited the protesters to storm LegCo complex.^{^{[63]}} In view of this, the government was being criticized of having pre-install options and making false public consultations.

==== Destroy local agriculture and natural environment ====
Civil society organizations (CSOs) claim that the planning will destroy one fourth of active farmlands. CSOs opposed full urbanization of the areas since the government does not formulate a policy concerns with sustainable development of rural areas.^{^{[64]}}

==== Collusion, transfer of benefits between government and the business sector ====
Open tender for land sales was replaced by ‘In-situ land exchange’ Policy. Those who own 4000m^{2} of land can apply for land exchange. This benefits the real estate developers, since they have already accumulated a lot of agricultural. Under this policy, they can change the use of land from agricultural to residential use by paying land premium instead of bidding the lands with high price. In term of this, the public criticized the planning paves the way for developers to build luxury apartments instead of building public housing.^{^{[65]}}

==== Paves the way to 'China-HK Integration’ ====
The planning suggests the areas use their geographical advantages to have more interactions with Shenzhen. Then Chief Executive, C.Y. Leung has made remarks on the planning during his Chief Executive Election campaign; he suggested developing the areas into a 'special administrative region' in Hong Kong which would be visa-free to Mainland visitors. Opposition leaders in the Legislative Council have claimed that this will affect the sovereignty of Hong Kong; however, the pro-Establishment camp has expressed that the 'visa-free zone' will boost the retail and tourism industry of the Northern New Territories, bringing positive economic benefits. ^{^{[66]}}There is still some opposition to this, but the government will consider this plan for the betterment and progress of Hong Kong while upholding the rule of law outlined in the constitutional document, the Basic Law. ^{^{[67]}}

== Subsequent development ==
The Advance Works, including site formation and infrastructure work, will commence in 2018. The first batch of resident intake is expected in 2023.^{^{[68]}} Modification of lease like in-situ land exchange will facilitate the first population intake in 2022. Completion of all construction works in KTN and FLN NDAs is designated in 2031.^{^{[69]}}
