= Oi Yuen Villa =

Villa in Hong Kong

Coordinates: 22.501516°N 114.118584°E

Oi Yuen Villa (Chinese: 愛園別墅) is a privately owned villa located in Kwu Tung, Sheung Shui, Hong Kong. The building has been listed as a Grade I historic building since June 2017.

== History ==
The villa was probably built before 1919, when it was described as the "Ladies Club House" of the Royal Hong Kong Golf Club. Its architect was probably Edward Albert Ram, who designed all the clubhouses for the Royal Hong Kong Golf Club in the 1890s and 1910s. The building was owned by Jardine Matheson from 1922 to 1946. Eric Blechynden Moller bought it in 1947 and used it as a villa. From 1949 to 1956, it was the property of Mollers' Lands Limited, a steamship company. In 1957, the villa was acquired by Mr Hui Oi-chow (許愛周) (1881-1966) as his private residence and renamed "Oi Yuen Villa". After his death in 1966, Mr. Hui was buried at the site of Oi Yuen Villa and the villa was inherited by his descendants.

== Features ==
Oi Yuen Villa is a single-storey house with a mezzanine floor built on a small hill within a wooded compound. Its architecture is a blend of Tudor and Classical styles and may be classified as Arts and Crafts.

== Future development ==
A residential development is planned in the vicinity of the villa, which is planned to be preserved as the development's clubhouse. However, the neighboring residents and villagers strongly protested against the development, as they believed the development will bring severe traffic congestion in Castle Peak Road, degrade the ventilation and ruin the fung-shui.

== Neighborhood ==
The villa is located beside Fanling Highway and across Castle Peak Road (Kwu Tung), north of the Hong Kong Golf Club. Other Western style buildings in the area include Yeung Garden (楊園), Kam Tsin Lodge (金錢別墅), Enchi Lodge (恩慈之家) and Fanling Lodge.
