= Edwin Richard Hallifax =

British senior official in Hong Kong

Secretary for Chinese Affairs
- In office ?-?

Personal details
- Born: 17 February 1874
- Died: 4 May 1950 (aged 76) Tiverton, Devon, England

Edwin Richard Hallifax CMG CBE (17 February 1874 – 4 May 1950) was a senior official in Hong Kong in the early 20th century. There is a double "l" in the spelling of his surname. His official Chinese name is "夏理德". He was regarded as a very conservative officer. He died on 4 May 1950 in Tiverton, Devon.

== Family ==
Hallifax was born on 17 February 1874, as the 7th son of Benjamin Wilson Hallifax and Mary Anne Cox. Both his parent was from Tiverton. They were married in Calcutta in 1960.

T. F. R. Waters, former Captain of Hong Kong Golf Club in 1959, wrote that Hallifax arranged to take his bride of two weeks out to his Police Bungalow house in Tai Po on 30 August and had organised a small house-warming party with the guests staying overnight. One of these guests was Jack Macgregor of Caldbecks. The house got so warm that it burnt down in the middle of the night when everything was lost including all the wedding presents.

Hallifax was a younger brother of Federick James Hallifax, President of the Singapore Municipality and formerly President of Municipality of Penang, who married Roberta Cunningham, a sister of Mrs. Meiklejohn, in Hawick, Scotland, on 8 July 1913. Cunningham was well known in Penang.

=== Noel Dan Hallifax ===
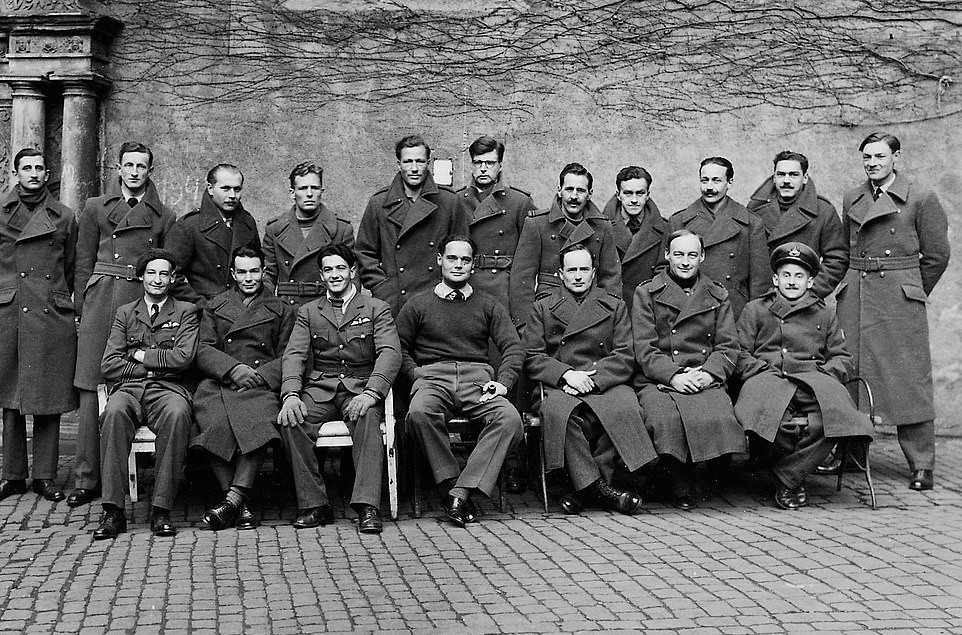
RAF mess at Colditz. Dan Hallifax (six from left, standing), Douglas Bader (sitting, center)

Hallifax's youngest son, Noel Dan Hallifax (1919–1946), was a Fight Lieutenant in the Royal Air Force who became a prisoner of war in Germany during World War II.

The Luftwaffe shot down Hallifax over Berlin on 15 May 1942. Injured, the Red Cross passed him for medical repatriation, which was contested by German command but eventually granted on 7 January 1945 after multiple escape attempts.

He died on 8 November 1946 at the age of 27 during an aircraft accident near Leeming Aerodrome, Yorkshire, on active service and was buried at Harrogate Stonefall Cemetery.

== Career ==
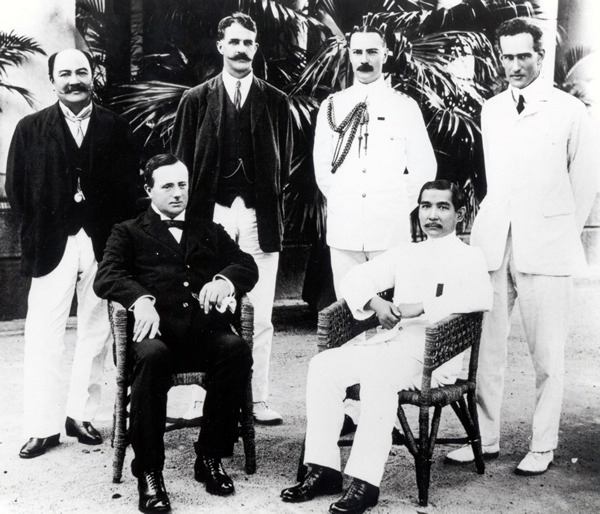
In 1912, E. R. Hallifax was one of those who accompanied Sir Claud Severn to meet Dr. Sun Yat-sen

He learnt Chinese from Sit Yanpo, father of Cantonese Opera artist Sit Koksin. He was well known by the Chinese community for his good skills in written and spoken Chinese language.

=== Secretary for Chinese Affairs ===
He was the Head of Registrar-General in Hong Kong; its title was changed to Secretary for Chinese Affairs in 1913.

In 1914, Kwong Wah Hospital was facing the problem of lack of funding to which Hallifax proposed to direct the income of Tin Hau temple in Yau Ma Tei toward the hospital.

In 1921, several Chinese community leaders, such as Shouson Chow and Fung Ping Shan proposed to establish a technical school for underprivileged children. Hallifax worried this would attract children from mainland China to come to Hong Kong and rejected it. In August 1922, the Chinese community leaders revised their proposal and set out the criteria for entry, which was only opened for local residents. Hallifax agreed with the new proposal and helped them locate the land to build the Aberdeen Industrial Institute, which is now called the Aberdeen Technical School.

On 7 April 1921, Dr. Sun Yat-sen was elected as the Extraordinary President of the Military Government in Guangzhou. The then Governor Sir Reginald Edward Stubbs was suspicious about Sun's co-operation with the Soviet Union and took a tough stand against the Military Government. On 4 May 1921, Hallifax, as the Secretary for Chinese Affairs, issued a notice to prohibit local Chinese in Hong Kong to celebrate the newly established Military Government in Guangzhou. On 6 May 1921, another notice noted that any fundraising activities for the Dr. Sun's government were not allowed. The Military Government reacted to these strongly and Stubbs finally caved in.

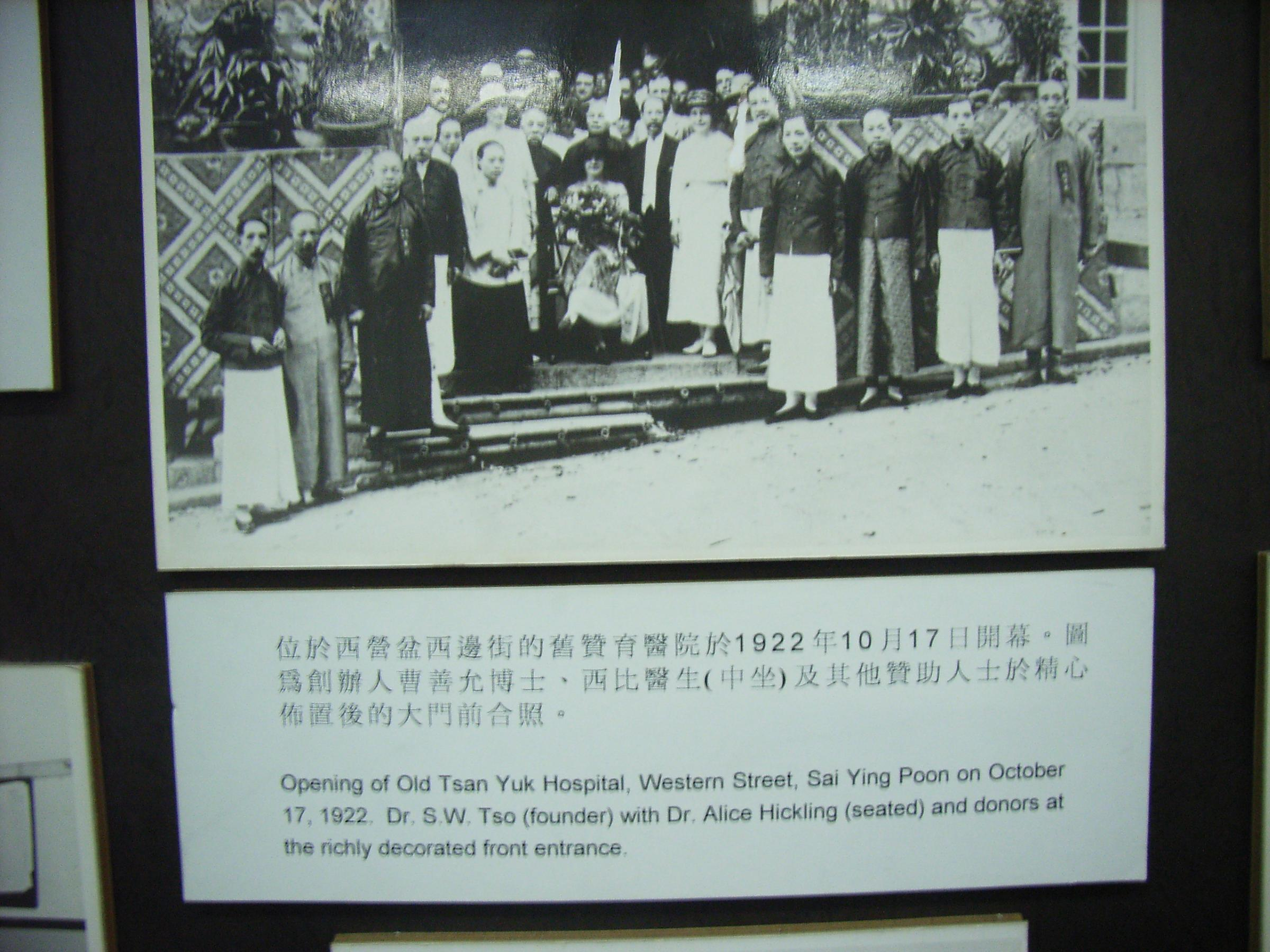
Tsan Yuk Hospital on 17 October 1922 – The Founder and the donors.

E.R. Hallifax played a role of the establishment of Tsan Yuk Hospital. It was Dr. S.W. Tso and Ng Hon-tsz advocated the establishment of the Hospital. Mrs. Hallifax was invited to deliver a speech when the Hospital was opened on 17 October 1922 and Mrs. Hallifax was the host of the ceremony.

In 1920, the Mechanics' Strike lasted for more than three weeks, and only after pressure from Secretary for Chinese Affairs, E.R. Hallifax, did the employers eventually concede to a 32.5% pay increase for the workers.

During the Seamen's strike of 1922, E. R. Hallifax, Secretary for Chinese Affairs, Lau Chu-pak and Shouson Chow all tried to broker a deal with the strike leaders, but without success.

In March 1927, the then Governor of Hong Kong, Sir Cecil Clementi, reported to London that gunmen from Canton had been sent to assassinate him, Hallifax, Shouson Chow and other loyal Chinese. Better relations with Canton eventually developed after Chiang Kai-shek's Kuomintang brutally purged the Communists in 1927.

In 1928, he was one of the members who accompanied Sir Cecil Clementi, the then Governor of Hong Kong, to visit Li Chai-Sum, the then Governor of Kwantung Province. The trip was regarded as an "Entente Cordiale" between the governments. A picture was taken for the visit.

=== Farewell dinner ===
On 14 March 1933, he and Sir Joseph Kemp received a warm tribute by the Chinese community leaders. A farewell dinner was held at the Kam Ling Restaurant, West Point, by their Chinese friends, Sir Shouson Chow paid a tribute to the work done by them in the Colony.

Hallifax recalled that "the days when he first came to the Colony, days during which the late Dr. Sun Yat-sen was kidnapped in London" He also recalled days spend in Canton and also his connection with the Police. He recounted some of the interesting cases during his connection with the Force. He then further told that his service in the New Territories that were his most pleasant memories. "For eight years I was in the New Territories, and I can only say that it was a lovely place – no roads, no railways, no houses of any account, no telephones. The telephone existed but it had the unhappy habit of breaking down at inconvenient times", said Mr. Hallifax. One incident in the New Territories, he recounted caused a good deal of amusement. He was a police officer, land officer, magistrate and treasury officer all at once. Once, while just about to go out for a jaunt in the country, he noticed his hat and several other articles were missing. The thief was apprehended and Mr. Hallifax had to act as complainant, charge him as a police officer, try, convict and sentence the thief as a Magistrate and collect the fine as a treasury officer!

Sir William Peel, the then Governor, also left his remarks during the dinner. He referred to Mr. Hallifax as a very old friend with whom he had travelled out nearly 35 years ago on the same ship to the Far East.

He received a warm tribute by the then Governor, Sir William Peel, on his last meeting in legislative council on 23 March 1933.

== Personal life ==
When he was the District Officer North (Taipo), he had been spending his recreational time walking over the hills with gun and dog and he was a familiar figure amongst the local farmers of Fanling and the neighbouring villages. In December 1908, when he was out shooting near Tai Po, his gun went off accidentally. Sone of the shots entered his hand. The wounds received temporary attention.

It was said that he was the man more than any other responsible for the construction of a course at Fanling. The relationship of the District Officer with the village elders everywhere was avuncular or, indeed, almost paternal.

He was the President of the Hong Kong Golf Club in 1926 and the Captain of the Club in 1915 and 1928. When he was retired, the Club presented him with a handsome souvenir as a mark of their appreciation for the work he done for the Club especially in the matter of liaisoning with Government on the occasion of his retirement from the Colony. The then Captain of the Club said during the occasion, "He had overcome Sir Henry May's anti-feeling, as he well remembers the days when Sir Henry used to ride his polo ponies over the greens at Happy Valley – before Sir Henry was converted to an enthusiastic golfer."

According to history writer Denis Way, he was also a keen rugby player and was the Chairman of the Hong Kong Football Club in 1913.
