= HMS Halifax =

Six ships of the Royal Navy have borne the name HMS Halifax, after the English town of Halifax, West Yorkshire and the city of Halifax, Nova Scotia.

- HMS Halifax (1756) was a 22-gun sloop launched in 1756 and captured by the French in the same year at Oswego
- HMS Halifax (1768) was a 6-gun schooner built 1765, purchased in 1768 and wrecked in 1775
- HMS Halifax (1775) was a schooner purchased in 1775 and sold 1780. She may have been the previous Halifax, salvaged and returned to service.
- HMS Halifax (1780) was an 18-gun sloop, originally USS Ranger, built 1777, renamed after the capture of Ranger on 11 May 1780; sold in 1781
- HMS Halifax (1782) was a 10-gun schooner purchased in 1782 and sold in 1784
- HMS Halifax (1797) was a 12-gun brig, the former French privateer Marie that the Royal Navy captured in 1797, commissioned in 1801, and sold that same year. She became the mercantile Halifax.
- HMS Halifax (1806) was an 18-gun sloop launched in 1806 at Halifax, Nova Scotia and broken up in 1814

== See also ==
- Ships of the Royal Canadian Navy named HMCS Halifax
