= HMCS Halifax =

Several Canadian naval units have been named HMCS Halifax.

- HMCS Halifax (K237) was a Flower-class corvette that served in the Second World War.
- HMCS Halifax (FFH 330) is the lead ship for the Halifax-class frigates.

== Battle Honours ==
Ships of the Royal Canadian Navy have earned the following battle honours;

- Atlantic, 1942–45
- Arabian Sea

== See also ==
- HMS Halifax
