= Halifax (name) =

Halifax is an English surname.

Notable people and characters with the name include:

== Title ==
- Earl of Halifax, a British title created four times and held by, among others:
  - Charles Montagu, 1st Earl of Halifax (1661–1715), English poet and statesman
  - George Montagu, 1st Earl of Halifax (c. 1684–1739), British politician
  - George Montagu-Dunk, 2nd Earl of Halifax (1716–1771)
  - Charles Wood, 1st Viscount Halifax (1800–1885), British Whig politician
  - Charles Wood, 2nd Viscount Halifax (1839–1934), British ecumenist
  - Edward Wood, 1st Earl of Halifax (1881–1959), British Conservative politician
  - Charles Wood, 2nd Earl of Halifax (1912–1980), British politician and peer
  - Peter Wood, 3rd Earl of Halifax (born 1944), British peer and Conservative politician
- Marquess of Halifax, a title in the Peerage of England created in 1682
  - George Savile, 1st Marquess of Halifax (1633–1695), English statesman, writer and politician
  - William Savile, 2nd Marquess of Halifax (1665–1700)

== Surname ==
- Joan Halifax (born 1942), Zen Buddhist roshi

== Fictional characters ==
- John Halifax, central character of the novel John Halifax, Gentleman (1856)
