= Huanggang Port =

Port of entry on the border between mainland China and Hong Kong

- 皇岗口岸
- Horizontal view of Huanggang Port from Hong Kong side

General information
- Type: Border control
- Location: Futian District, Shenzhen, China
- Coordinates: 22.52074°N 114.07496°E
- Opened: 1989; 12 October 2026; 24 days ago (Renovation)
- Operator: National Immigration Administration, General Administration of Customs, Immigration Department, Hong Kong Customs and Excise Department

Website
- ka.sz.gov.cn sb.gov.hk
- Coordinates: 22°31′24″N 114°04′04″E
- Carries: Pedestrians, vehicles
- Crosses: Frontier Closed Area

Statistics
- Toll: No toll

Location
- Interactive map of Huanggang Port

Huanggang Port
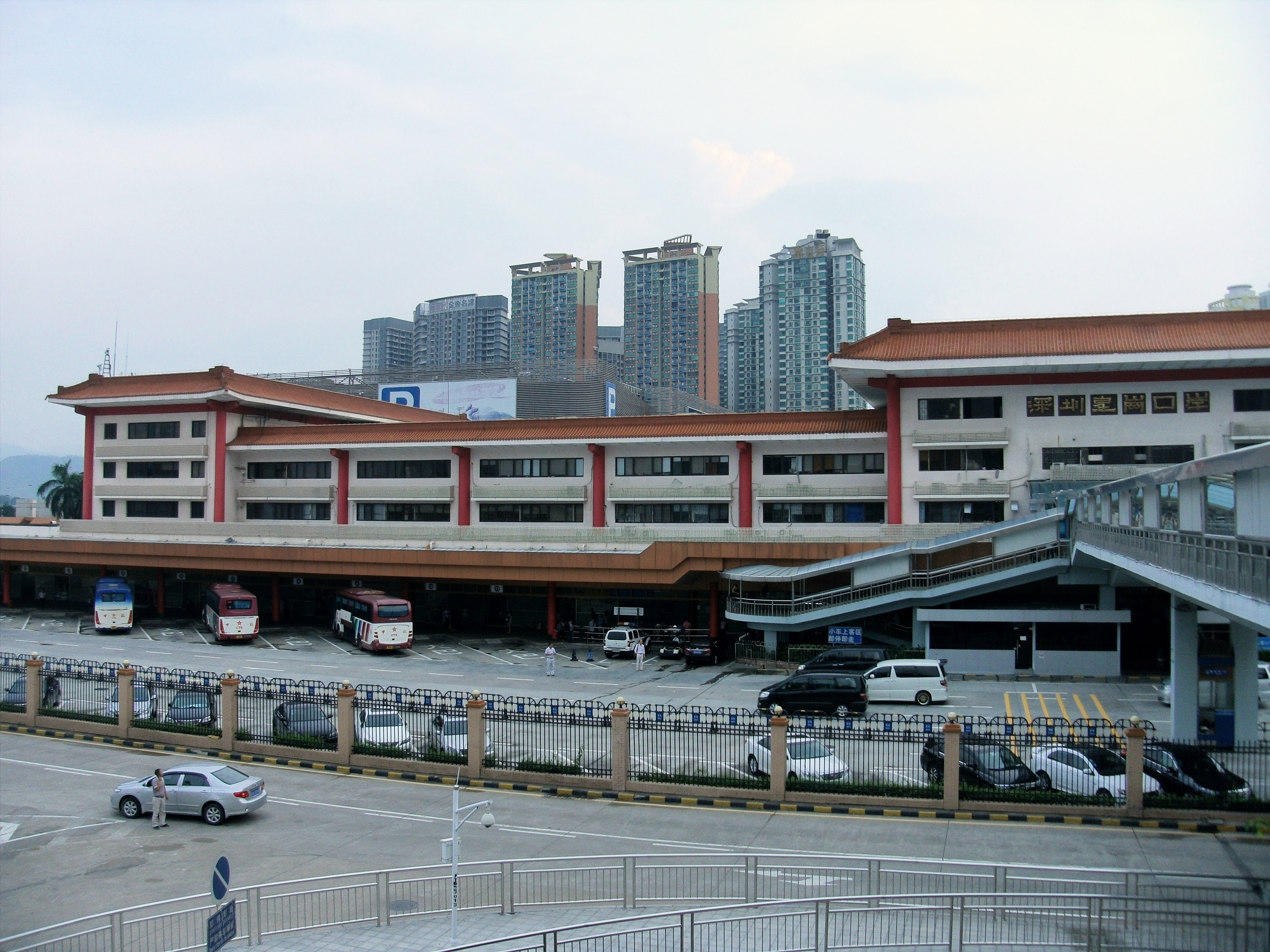

- Simplified Chinese: 皇岗口岸
- Traditional Chinese: 皇崗口岸
Transcriptions
Standard Mandarin
- Hanyu Pinyin: Huánggǎng Kǒu'àn
Yue: Cantonese
- Jyutping: wong4 gong1 hau2 ngon6

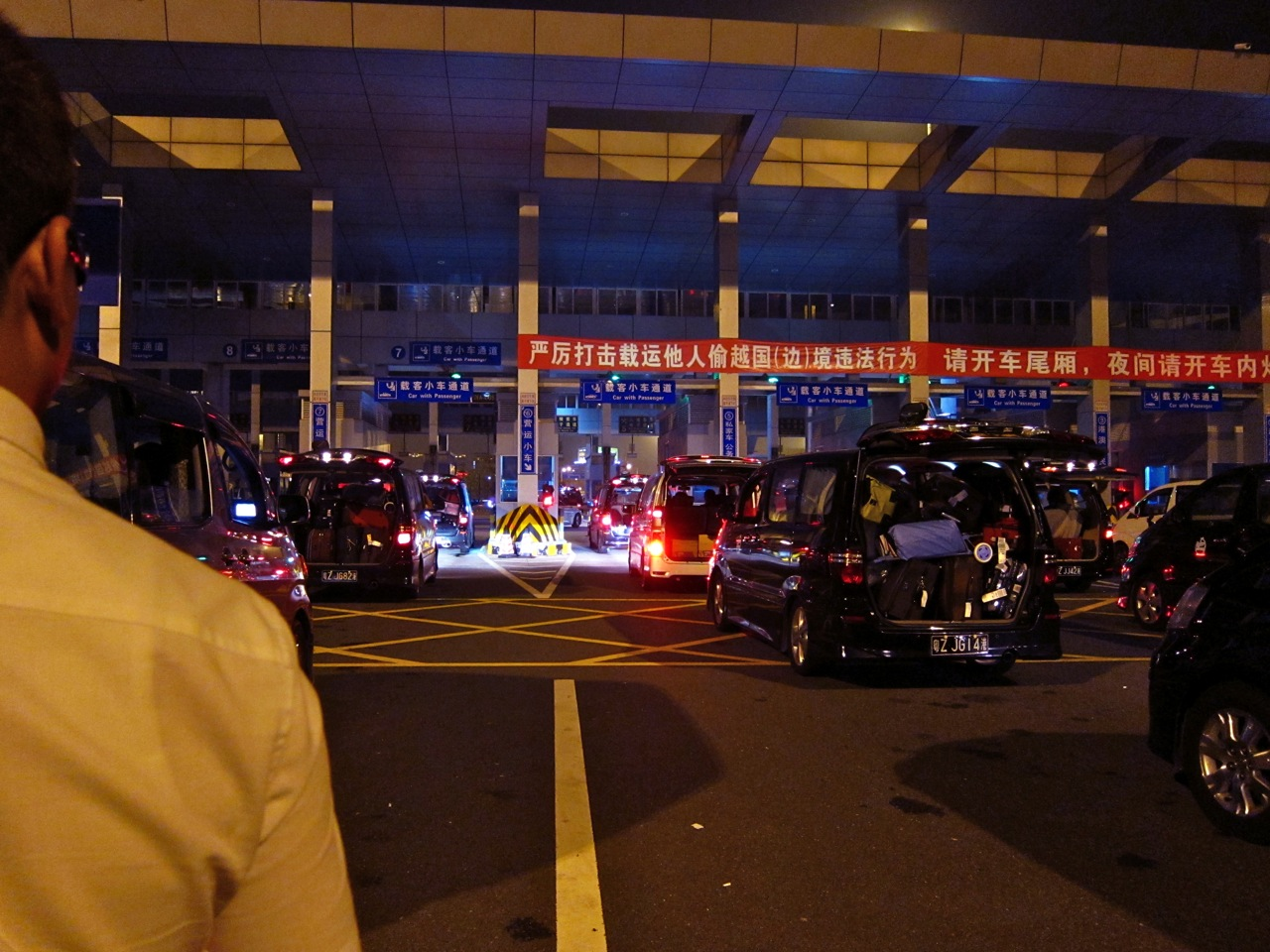
Old Huanggang Port vehicular border crossing between Lok Ma Chau, Hong Kong and Shenzhen, Guangdong

Huanggang Port (Chinese: 皇岗口岸) is a 24-hour port of entry on the border between mainland China and Hong Kong, in the Futian District of Shenzhen, Guangdong. Its counterpart in Hong Kong is the closed Lok Ma Chau Control Point, located in Lok Ma Chau in Hong Kong's New Territories, across the Sham Chun River from Huanggang.

Huanggang Port, close to Shenzhen city centre, is one of the five most important ports that connect the city and Hong Kong. On its west is the start of the Guangshen Expressway, which is the main thoroughfare connecting Shenzhen and Hong Kong. At present, it is both the largest comprehensive road crossings for passengers in China and one of the largest land crossings. Every day, about 20,000 vehicles pass through it. At the same time, it is also a passenger transit point. It is the second busiest in Shenzhen after Luohu Port and the third largest passenger crossing after the Gongbei Port in Zhuhai.

The new Huanggang Port commenced operations at 6:30 am on 12 October 2026. It is also the world's largest land port building by total single area.

== Floor locations ==
Floor	Shenzhen Port Area	Hong Kong Port Area
L5M2	Plant Room	Plant Room
L5M1	Duty-free Shop, Office	Office
L5	Arrival Hall	Departure Hall
L4M1	Office	Office
L4	Departure Hall	Arrival Hall
L3M	Clearance Departure Hall for Vehicle Passengers	Clearance Arrival Hall for Vehicle Passengers
L3	Departure Vehicles	Arrival Vehicles
L2	Cross-border Buses Loading and Unloading Zones	Huanggang Port Public Transport Interchange, Cross-border Buses Loading and Unloading Zones
L1M	Clearance Arrival Hall for Vehicle Passengers	Clearance Departure Hall for Vehicle Passengers
L1	Arrival Vehicles	Departure Vehicles, Fire Station
B1M	Hong Kong-Shenzhen Evacuation Floor	
B1	Shenzhen Huanggang Port Bus Terminal, Taxis, Coaches	Government Vehicle Car Park
B2	Metro Transit Hall / Metro Huanggang Checkpoint Station Exit A & B	Metro Transit Hall / Government Canteen
B3	Car Park, Ride-hailing Vehicles	Plant Room
B4	Car Park	Plant Room

== Public transport access ==
=== Hong Kong Port Area ===
==== Bus ====
Daytime Bus Route	Terminating Point	Service Area
B10	Huanggang Port ⇄ Kwai Fong (Kwai Tsui Estate)	Kwai Fong, Tsing Yi, Tai Lam Tunnel Bus Interchange
B11	Huanggang Port ⇄ Tin Shui Wai (Tin Fu)	Tin Shui Wai, Yuen Long, San Tin
B12	Huanggang Port ⇄ Wu Kai Sha Station	Ma On Shan, Pak Shek Kok, Tai Po, San Tin
B13	Huanggang Port ⇄ Siu Sai Wan Island Resort	North Hong Kong Island, San Tin
B14	Huanggang Port ⇄ Kai Tak Olympic Avenue	Kai Tak
B15	Huanggang Port ⇄ Tuen Mun Castle Peak Bay	Tuen Mun, Hung Shui Kiu

Overnight Bus Route	Terminating Point	Service Area
NB73	Huanggang Port ⇄ Sha Tin Town Centre	Sha Tin, Tai Po, Fanling, Sheung Shui, San Tin

==== Green Minibus ====
Green Minibus Daytime Route	Terminating Point	Service Area
44B	Huanggang Port ⇄ Tuen Mun Station	Northwest Tuen Mun, San Tin
44B1	Huanggang Port ⇄ Tuen Mun Ferry Pier	South Tuen Mun, Tuen Mun Town Centre, San Tin
78	Huanggang Port ⇄ Pat Heung Road	Pat Heung, Kam Tin, Ngau Tam Mei, San Tin

Green Minibus Overnight Route	Terminating Point	Service Area
79S	Huanggang Port ⇄ Tin Shui Wai Grandeur Terrace	Tin Shui Wai, Yuen Long, San Tin
616S	Huanggang Port ⇄ Mong Kok Sai Yeung Choi Street South	Mong Kok, Kowloon Tong
N44B	Huanggang Port ⇄ Tuen Mun Ferry Pier	South Tuen Mun, Tuen Mun Town Centre, Northwest Tuen Mun

==== 24-hour Coach Services ====
There are many cross-border traffic routes in Huanggang Port, which lead to Tsim Sha Tsui, Mong Kok, Lam Tin, Wan Chai and Tsuen Wan in Hong Kong. Routes to Tsim Sha Tsui, Mong Kok, Lam Tin, Wan Chai, Tsuen Wan operate 24-hour.

Route	Terminating Point	Service Area
Tsuen Wan Shuttle	Daytime: Huanggang Port ⇄ Tsuen Wan Discovery Park and Luk Yeung Sun Chuen; Overnight: Huanggang Port ⇄ Tsuen Wan Station	Tsuen Wan
Mong Kok Shuttle	Huanggang Port ⇄ Arran Street, Mong Kok	Mong Kok
Yau Tsim Shuttle	Huanggang Port ⇄ Austin Road Cross Boundary Coach Terminus	Tsim Sha Tsui, Jordan, Yau Ma Tei
Kwun Tong Shuttle	Huanggang Port ⇄ Lam Tin Station	Lam Tin, Kwun Tong, Kowloon Bay, Diamond Hill
Wan Chai Shuttle	Huanggang Port ⇄ Exhibition Centre Station	Wan Chai, Sheung Wan

==== Taxis ====
Only pre-booked taxis at designated platform or licensed taxis such as NT Taxi and Urban Taxi are permitted to enter designated waiting area of the boundary control area within the building. Ride-hailing services is not available.

==== Hong Kong MTR ====
The northern link of the MTR System has announced that a station will be situated at this checkpoint, with an expected opening date in 2034.

=== Shenzhen Port Area ===
==== Shenzhen Metro ====
Shenzhen Metro Line 7: Huanggang Checkpoint station Exit A (to Hong Kong) and Exit B (from Hong Kong)

Huanggang Port connects with the Shenzhen Metro Line 7 (Shenzhen Metro) at Huanggang Checkpoint station opened in October 2016. The counterpart Lok Ma Chau Checkpoint on the Hong Kong side is not accessible via Hong Kong's MTR system. Futian Port a few hundred metres from Huanggang Port but has large buildings in between making walking between the two impractical. Station nearby connects with Lok Ma Chau station on the MTR, although there is no direct metro connection between Huanggang and Futian nor between the 2 checkpoints on the Hong Kong side.

==== Bus ====
Route Number	Route		
23	Huanggang Port	⇆	Ningshui Garden
366	Huanggang Port	⇆	Pingshan Comprehensive Bonded Zone
E25	Shopping Park Metro Station	⇆	Deling School
M169	Huanggang Port	⇆	Ziweige
A10	Futian Port City Terminal	Direct →	Airport Ground Transit Centre West
A10	Futian Port City Terminal	Direct ←	New Airport Terminal
N68	Huanggang Port	↺	Huanggang Port
NA11	Huanggang Port	⇆	New Airport Terminal
T322	Huanggang Port	↺	Huanggang Port

=== Former cross-border shuttle bus ===
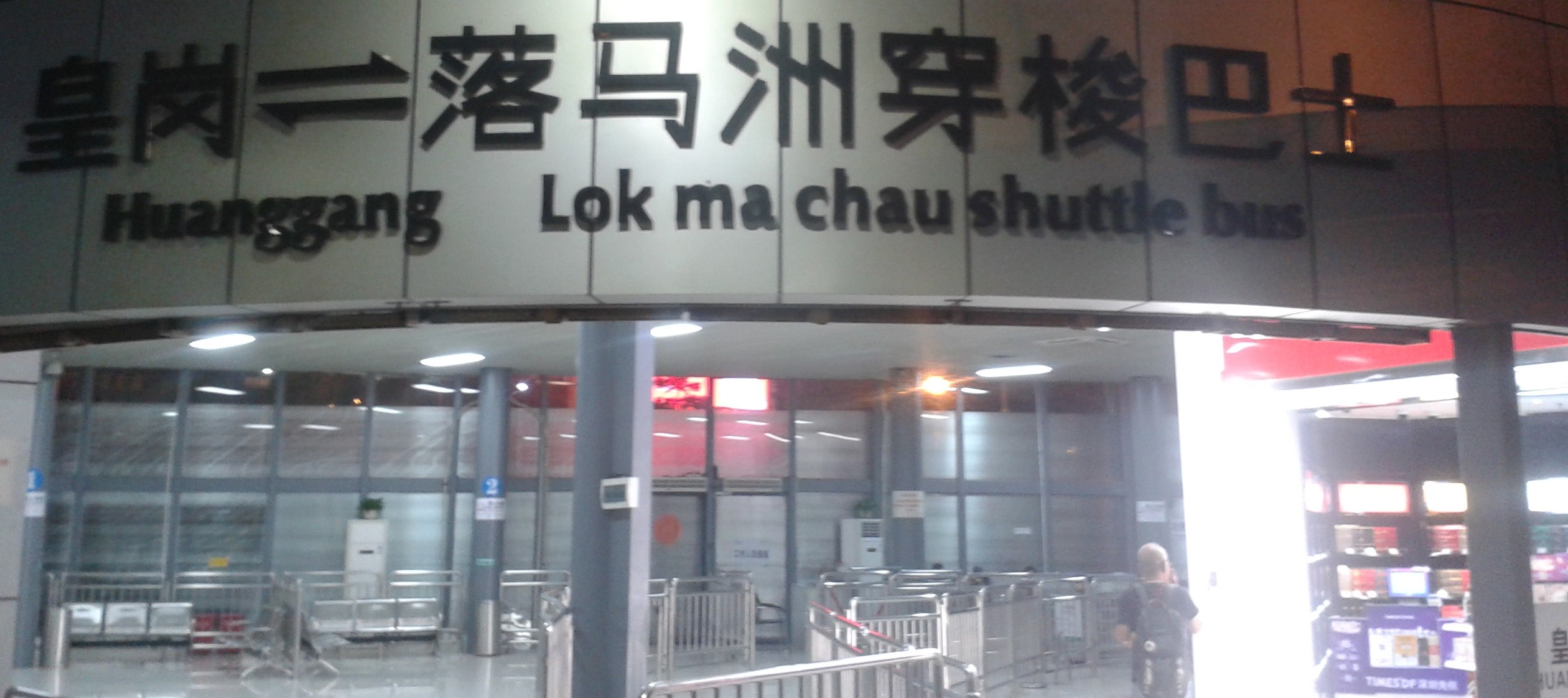
The cross border shuttle bus terminus at Huanggang Control Point.

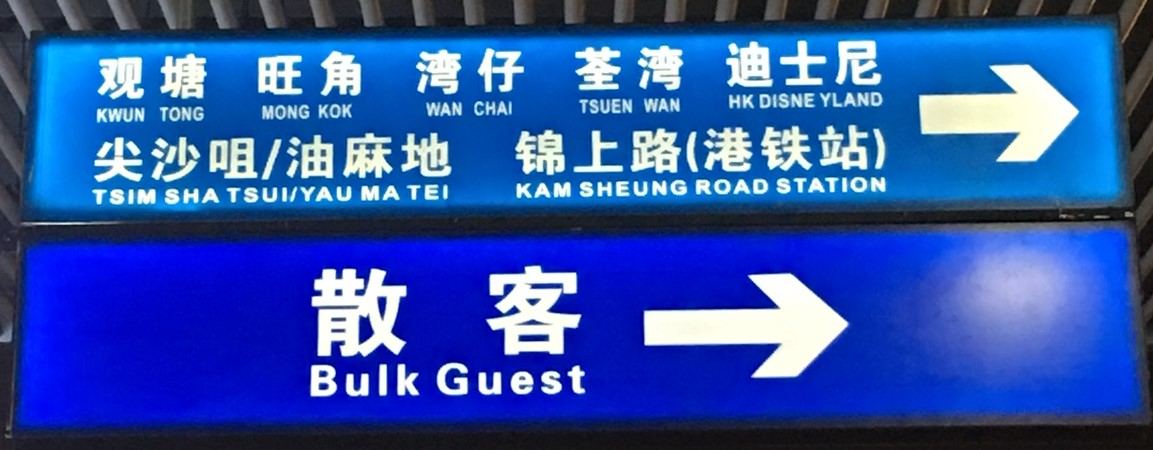
Sign at Huanggang Port indicating direction to unfranchised bus across Hong Kong.

For improved passenger service, there are stops for direct buses and the ticket office at Huanggang Port. The stops are at the south of the passenger checking building, and the east of the shuttle buses, and there are six parking spaces reserved for short-term buses, for passengers to get on the buses. The six ticket offices are temporarily on the south of the passenger checking building, and the east of the departure passageway.

There were also many buses between Huanggang Port and the Border Control Station in Lok Ma Chau in Hong Kong.

After the Huanggang port began 24/7 service, the number of passengers per day quickly increased from 50 thousand to 110 thousand per day, up to a maximum of 172,000. Every day, buses cross the border between 1000 and 1100 times, twice the normal number and far more than the designed capacity of the number of passengers and vehicles. To solve this problem, the authorities in Guangdong and Hong Kong agreed to provide a combined service of long and short-term buses. There are five groups of six routes of short-term buses between Huangguang Port and Hong Kong, which run between Wan Chai, Tsim Sha Tsui, Kwun Tong, Tsuen Wan, Mong Kok, and Kam Tin in Hong Kong and Huangguang Port, with the Mong Kok, and Kam Tin together in one group. It is run by 5 groups of companies made of 93 passenger transportation companies, and has been operating for 2 years. All the routes operate 24 hours a day except for the Kam Tin route, which works about 18 hours. The bus frequency of every route is at least 60 times. When busy, every 15 minutes and 30 minutes at less busy times and at midnight. Furthermore, buses of every route have the same color and the same ticket price to simplify management.

With the closure of Lok Ma Chau Control Point in Hong Kong's New Territories, All shuttle bus routes from Huanggang Port to Lok Ma Chau Control Point and vice versa will officially ceased operation and retired effective from 12 October 2026 after nearly 30 years serving Shenzhen and Hong Kong.
