= Futian Port =

Futian Port / Lok Ma Chau Spur Line Control Point
- 福田口岸 / 落馬洲支線管制站
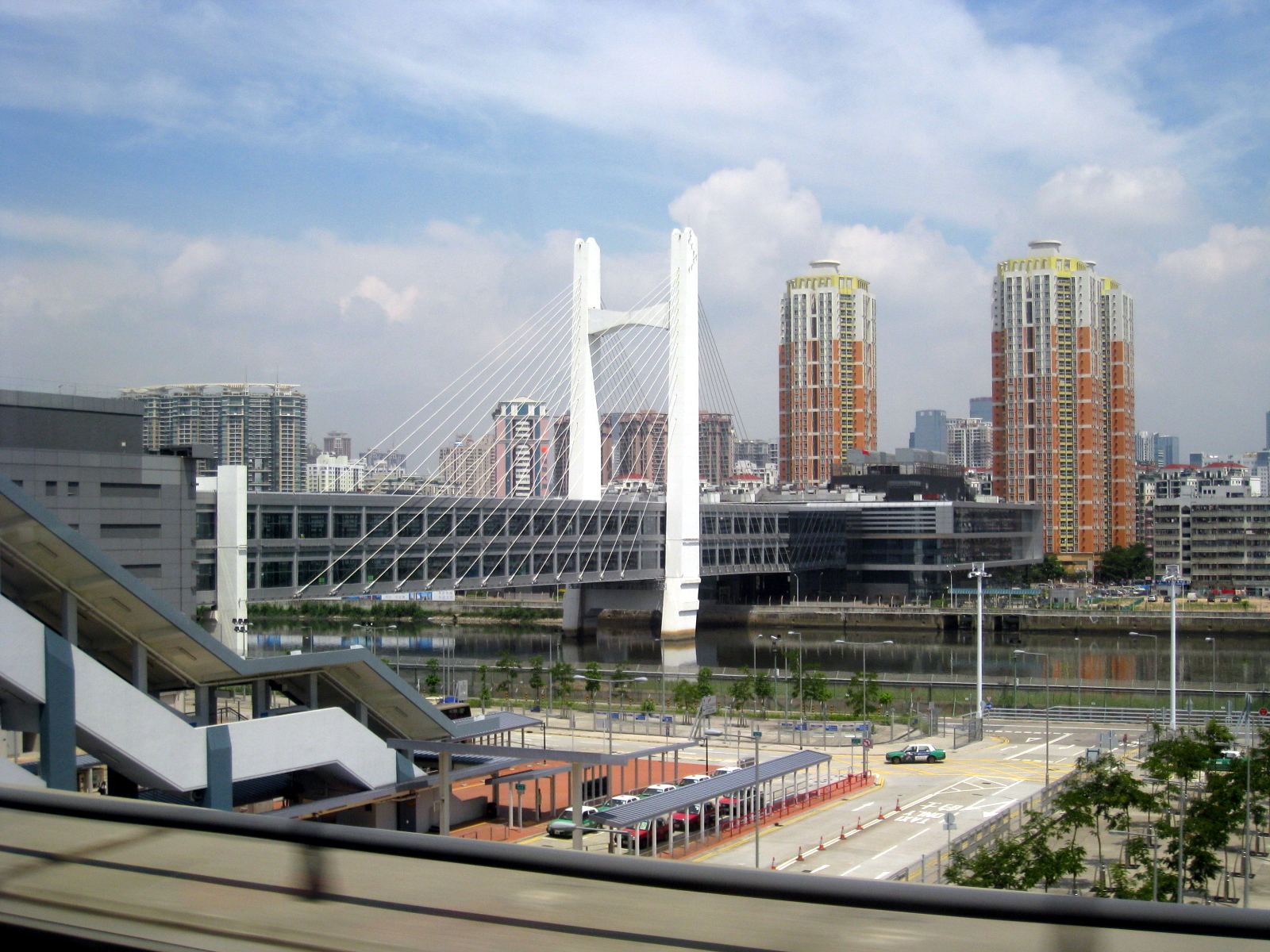
- The double-deck footbridge connecting the two-side ports across the Sham Chun River

General information
- Type: Border control
- Location: Futian District, Shenzhen / Lok Ma Chau, Hong Kong, China
- Coordinates: 22.51577°N 114.06877°E
- Opened: 15 August 2007
- Operator: National Immigration Administration (mainland China); Immigration Department (Hong Kong)

Website
- ka.sz.gov.cn (mainland China) td.gov.hk (Hong Kong)
- Coordinates: 22°30′58″N 114°04′08″E
- Carries: Pedestrians
- Crosses: Frontier Closed Area

Statistics
- Toll: No toll

Location
- Interactive map of Futian Port

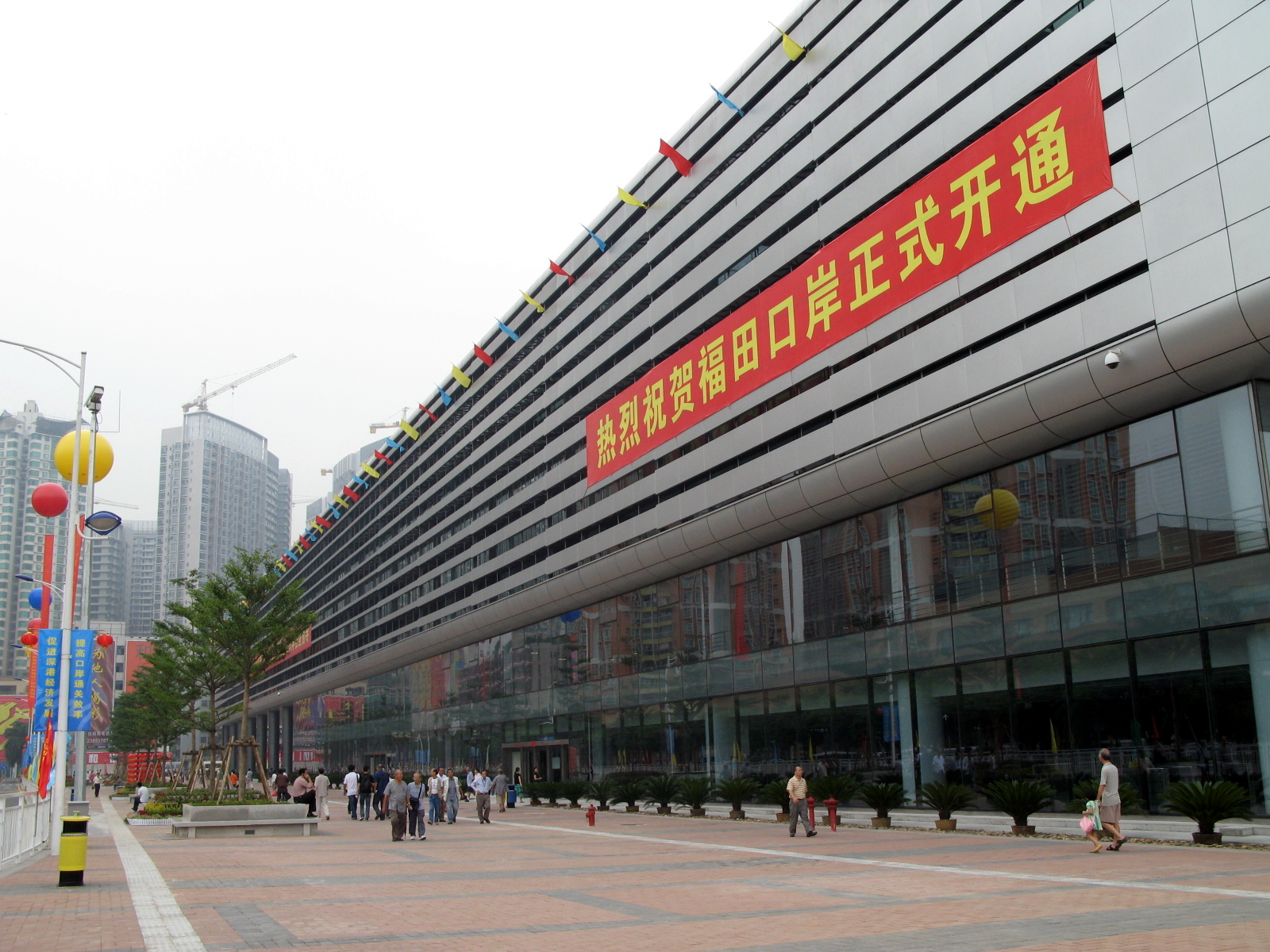
Futian Port Building

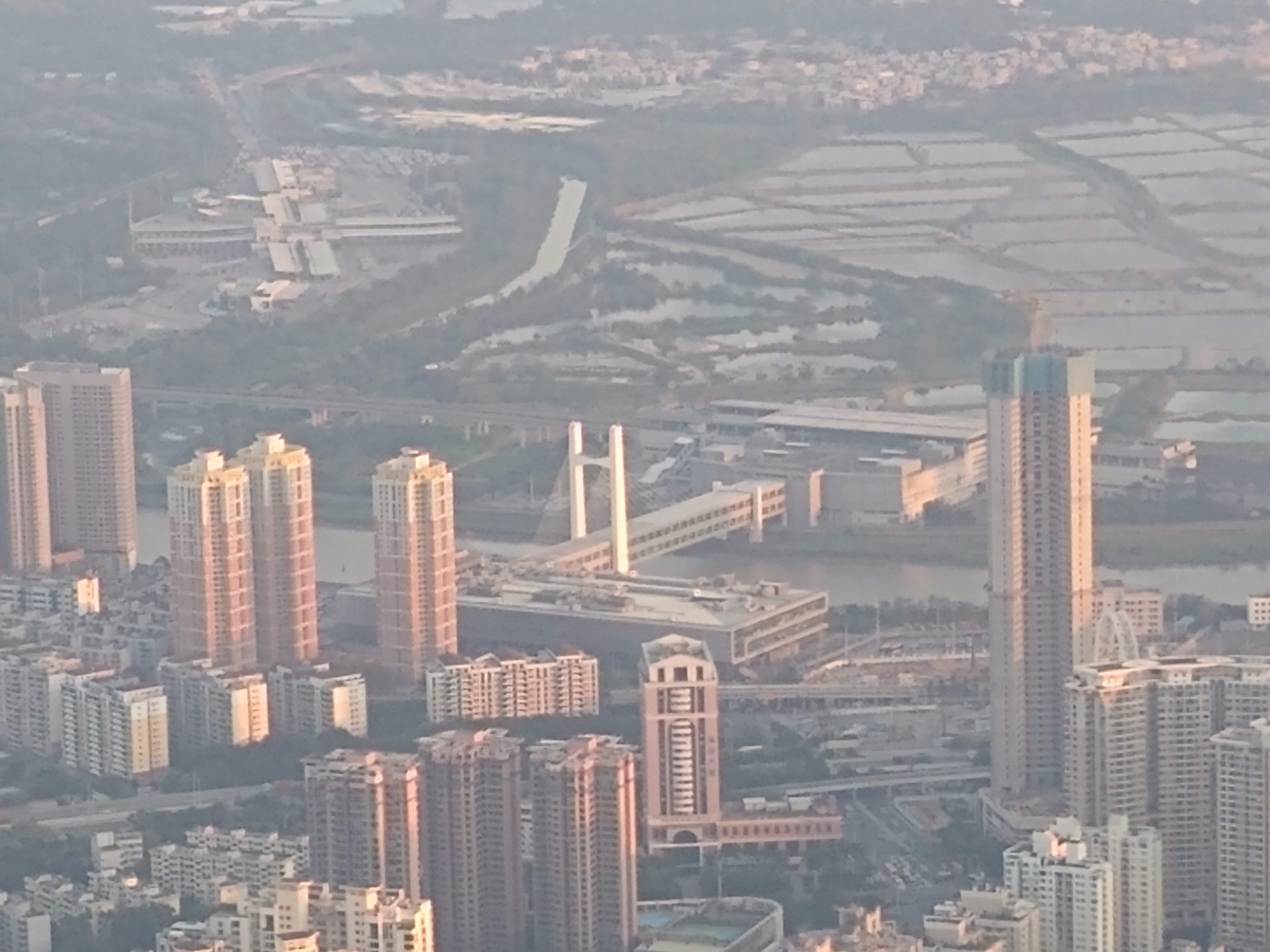
Aerial view

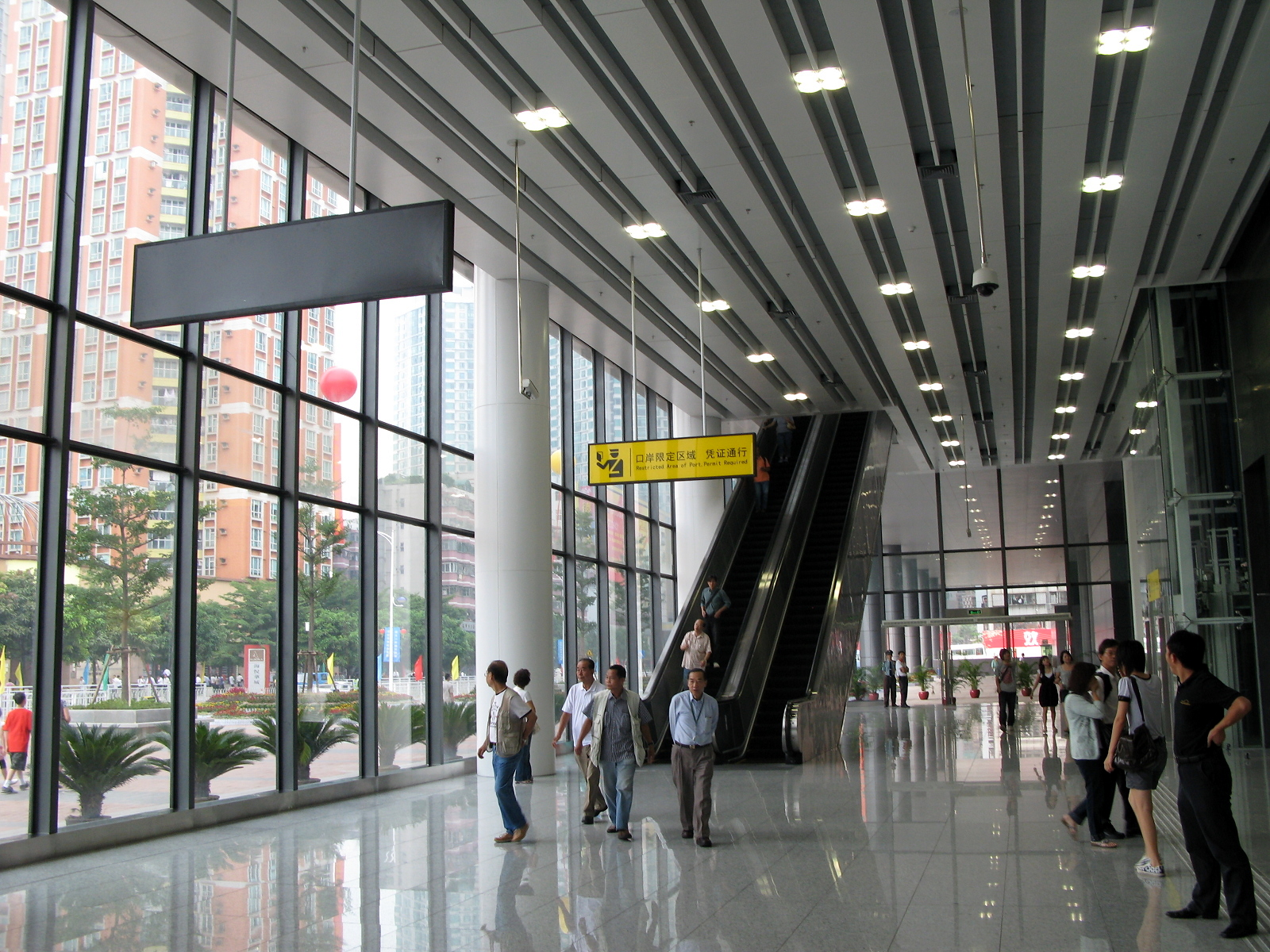
Inside the Futian Port Building

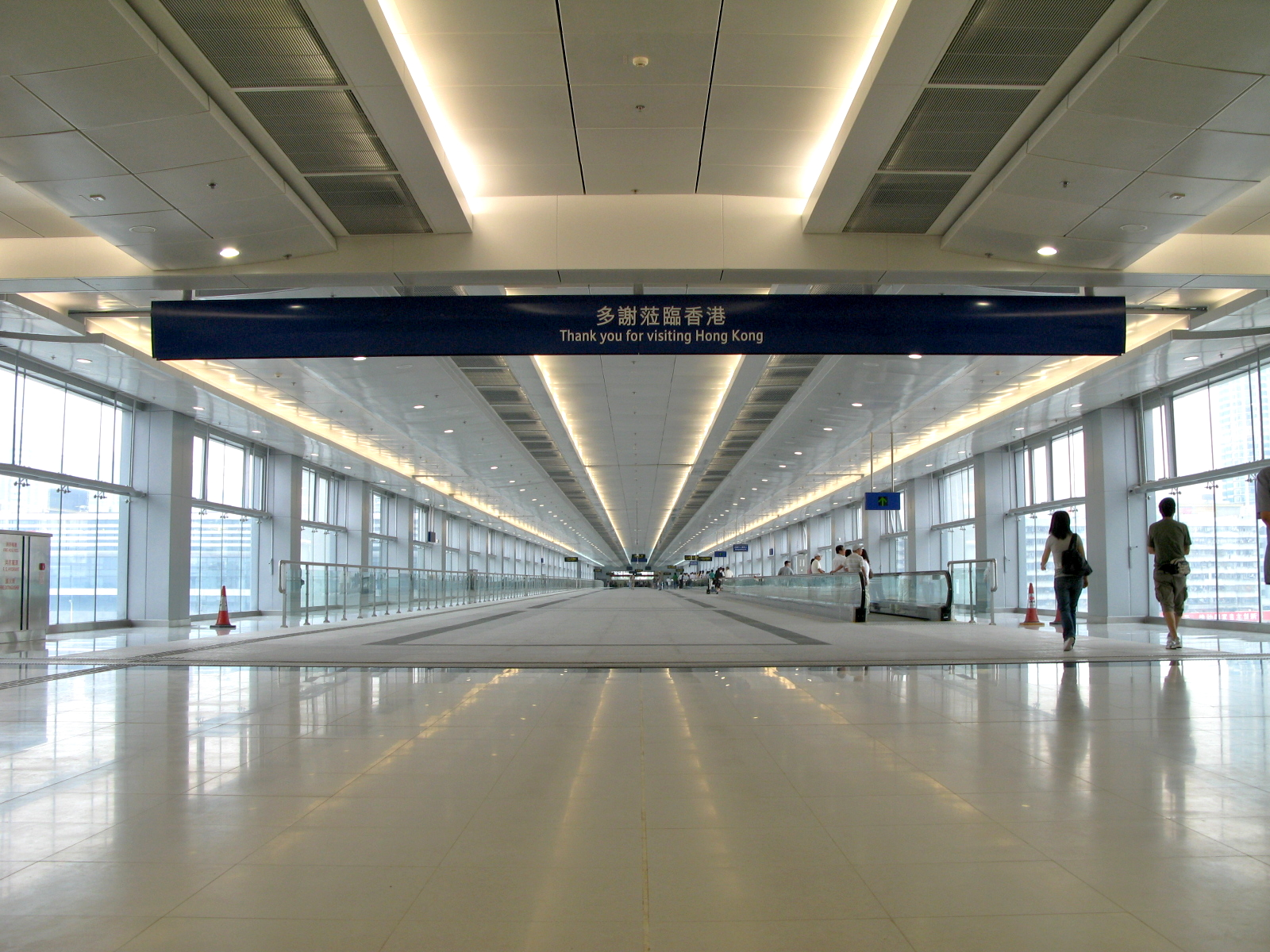
The entrance of Futian Port Building from Lok Ma Chau Station

Futian Port (Chinese: 福田口岸; pinyin: Fútián Kǒu'àn) or the Lok Ma Chau Spur Line Control Point (Chinese: 落馬洲支線管制站) is an immigration port of entry/border crossing on the border between mainland China and Hong Kong, located in the Futian District of Shenzhen in mainland China.

It is in the same building as Futian Checkpoint station on Shenzhen Metro Line 4, Line 10 and Huanggang Checkpoint station on Shenzhen Metro Line 7 is a short walk away. The port acts as the Hong Kong counterpart to the Lok Ma Chau Spur Line Control Point. On the Hong Kong side, it is connected to the Lok Ma Chau station in Lok Ma Chau, Hong Kong through a pedestrian footbridge.

It has been in operation since 15 August 2007 and is the second border crossing along the border with a railway connection, after Luohu Port/Lo Wu Control Point.

== Mainland China ==
The Shenzhen Metro at Futian Port is connected to the East Railway Station in Lok Ma Chau, Hong Kong by Futian-Lok Ma Chau Pedestrian Bridge. This is a double-deck bridge with a cable-stayed on the top, which is novel and unique worldwide. Its length is 211 metres (692 ft), the depth of the deeper side is 87 metres (285 ft), and the width is 16.5 metres (54 ft). The upper and the lower layers are both unidirectional, to ensure that passengers do not meet those crossing in the opposite direction. Also, there is an immigration control point at both sides of the bridge. There are separate passages for the blind on the bridge. On the east of the bridge is the united checking building and on its west is the united checking building of Lok Ma Chau, Hong Kong. Because of the subway and the united checking building, and the subway and the ground transportation together carrying the passengers entering and exiting, it will become a three-dimensional transportation thoroughfare between underground and ground. Squares, lawns and roads will be built around the stations and united checking building, according to regional planning. Once completed, the daily passenger capacity will be 190,000. Passengers from Hong Kong and Macau will spend only 15 seconds entering.

=== Transport ===
==== Metro ====
- Shenzhen Metro Line 4: Futian Checkpoint station Exit A
- Shenzhen Metro Line 10: Futian Checkpoint station Exit C

== Hong Kong SAR ==
Transport

MTR East Rail line: Lok Ma Chau station

The control point was opened on 15 August 2007 together with the opening of the KCR Lok Ma Chau Spur Line between Lok Ma Chau and Sheung Shui station. The crossing consists of a cable-stay double-deck pedestrian bridge across the Sham Chun River, which forms the border between Hong Kong and the rest of the PRC. The lower deck handles pedestrians heading from Hong Kong to Futian Port, while the upper deck handles those coming from Futian Port to Hong Kong. Immigration facilities are located within the station building on both ends of the bridge. Electricity to the Hong Kong half of the bridge is provided by CLP Power, and Hong Kong's jurisdiction and law enforcement on the bridge also terminate at the midpoint, as on the Lo Wu Bridge.

The control point is open between 06:30 and 22:30, unlike the 24-hour vehicle Lok Ma Chau Control Point nearby. Later pedestrian crossing can be made at Lo Wu Control Point, until 00:00.

Although the Lok Ma Chau Spur Line Control Point is often referred to as a railway crossing, it is in fact a pedestrian crossing, unlike the Lo Wu Control Point, where no bus or any other public transport can reach. Furthermore, there is no through-train service, as the railway line is not connected with the railways in mainland China. And although the bulk of the users are train passengers, the Lok Ma Chau pedestrian crossing can also be reached by bus, taxi and mini bus from various parts of the New Territories.

The Lok Ma Chau transport interchange is located to the east of Lok Ma Chau station and is connected with the station via footbridges. The entrance and exit between the station and the interchange are guarded by the police as the area is located within the Frontier Closed Area.

The checkpoint has 2 road public transport services both to/from the West (MTR trains to the checkpoint run to/from the East). Those road services are:

- Bus B1
- Green minibus 75

Both run to/from Yuen Long town centre from where other destinations in Western New Territories can be reached by road and rail. Among public transport destinations from Yuen Long is also bus 968 to Hong Kong Island via the Western Harbour Crossing.

Bus B1 and green minibus 75 operate via San Tin PTI. San Tin PTI offers many more connections than Lok Ma Chau Spur Line Checkpoint. KMB bus routes 76K, 276B, B1, N73, A43P, R41, X43, 178R (R41, X43 and 178R available Events Only) and all serve San Tin Public Transport Interchange.

=== Operating hours ===
06:30 to 22:30 every day. Later pedestrian crossing can be made at Lo Wu Control Point, until 00:00 or Lok Ma Chau Control Point which is 24 hours.

== See also ==
- Futian Checkpoint station
- Huanggang Checkpoint station
- Lok Ma Chau station
