= Lok Ma Chau station =

MTR station in the New Territories, Hong Kong

Lok Ma Chau 落馬洲
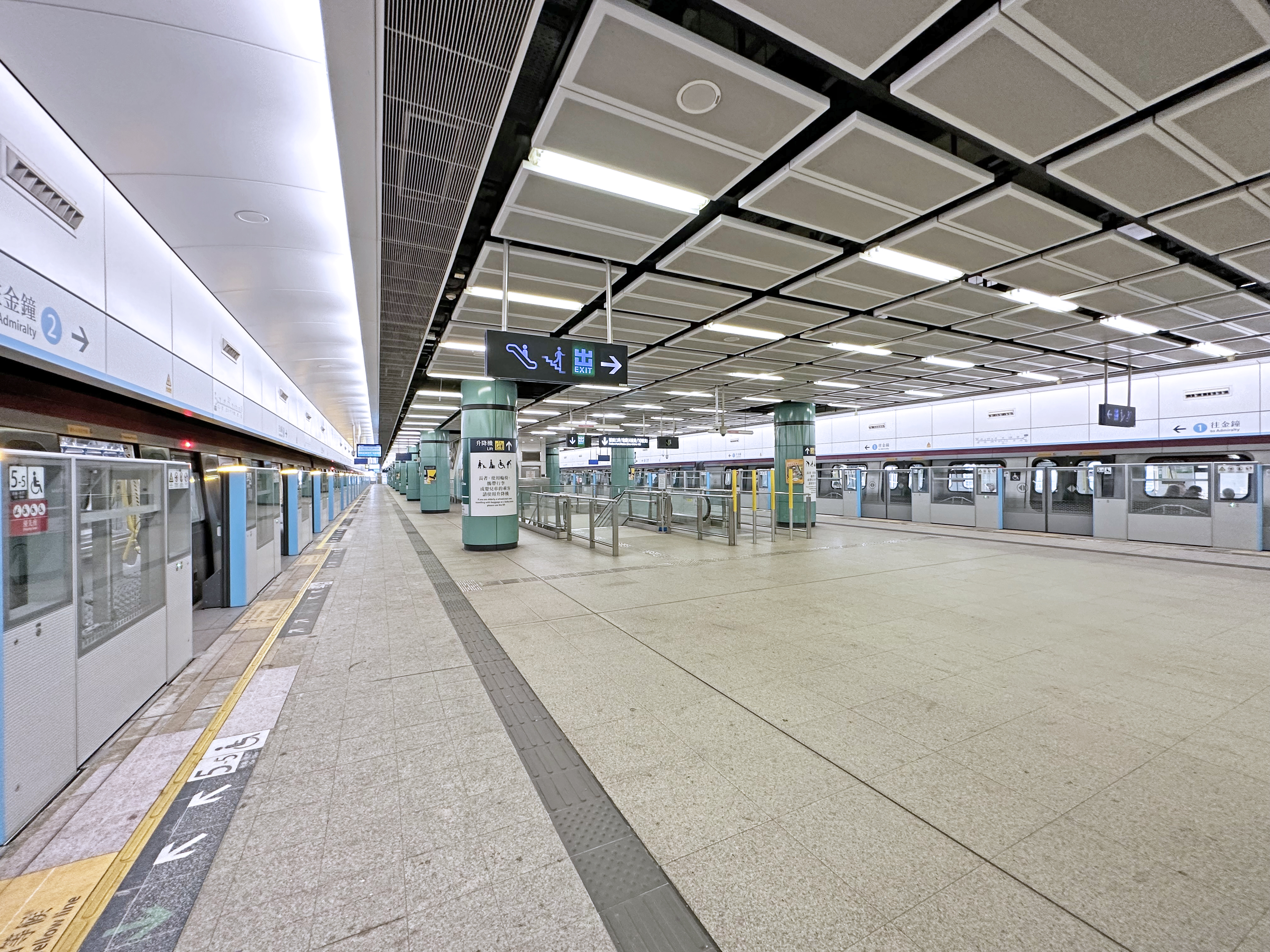
- Platform 2 (foreground)

General information
- Location: Border Road, Lok Ma Chau; Yuen Long District, Hong Kong
- Coordinates: 22°30′52″N 114°03′57″E
- System: MTR rapid transit station
- Owner: Kowloon-Canton Railway Corporation
- Operator: MTR Corporation
- Line: East Rail line
- Platforms: 2 (1 island platform)
- Tracks: 2
- Connections: Futian Port: Line 4 (Futian Checkpoint) Exit A; Line 10 (Futian Checkpoint) Exit C; Lok Ma Chau Station Public Transport Interchange: Bus KMB route B1, minibus route 75 and Taxi

Construction
- Structure type: Elevated
- Platform levels: 1
- Accessible: Yes

Other information
- Station code: LMC

History
- Opened: 15 August 2007; 19 years ago

Passengers
- 2012: 60,000 daily entries and exits

Services
Preceding station	MTR	Following station
Sheung Shui towards Admiralty	East Rail line	Terminus
Future
Kwu Tung towards Admiralty	East Rail line	Terminus
Across mainland China–Hong Kong boundary
Preceding station	Shenzhen Metro	Following station
Fumin towards Niuhu	Line 4 transfer at Futian Checkpoint	Terminus
Terminus	Line 10 transfer at Futian Checkpoint	Fumin towards Shuangyong Street
Track layout
Location
- Location within MTR

Lok Ma Chau station
- Chinese: 落馬洲
- Cantonese Yale: lohk mah jau
- Literal meaning: Dismount Place
Transcriptions
Standard Mandarin
- Hanyu Pinyin: Luòmazhōu
Yue: Cantonese
- Yale Romanization: lohk mah jau
- Jyutping: lok6 maa5 zau1

Lok Ma Chau (Chinese: 落馬洲) is the northwestern terminus in Lok Ma Chau on the Lok Ma Chau Spur Line, a branch line of the East Rail line of Hong Kong's MTR network, which was built to alleviate the immigration checkpoint between Hong Kong and mainland China's Shenzhen at Lo Wu station. Its livery is teal. MTR Corporation promotes use of Lok Ma Chau as a direct connection with Line 4 and alongside Line 10 of the Shenzhen Metro, the former which is also operated by the MTR Corporation.

On 4 February 2020, MTR temporarily closed this station and suspended train service to and from this station following the Government's measures to contain the outbreak of the COVID-19 pandemic. The station reopened on 8 January 2023.

== History ==
Lok Ma Chau station, together with the spur line, opened on the afternoon of 15 August 2007. The adjoining Futian Checkpoint station on Line 4 of the Shenzhen Metro opened on 28 June 2007. Like Lo Wu station, this station is located in the Frontier Closed Area, hence access is restricted to passengers with a permit or a passport and visa to mainland China.

On 2 December 2007, this station was leased to the MTR Corporation, along with the entire KCR network, by the Kowloon-Canton Railway Corporation(the KCRC), for a period of 50 years, giving Lok Ma Chau station the shortest station life under KCRC operation.

== Station layout ==
L3; T	Ticket office	Ticket machines, shops, automatic teller machines
L2; A/P	Footbridge	Footbridge (Mainland China to Hong Kong)
L2; A/P	Arrival hall	Hong Kong Immigration Department and Customs and Excise Department checkpoints, shops, washrooms
L2; A/P	Platform 1	← East Rail line towards Admiralty (Sheung Shui)
L2; A/P	Island platform, doors will open on the left or right
L2; A/P	Platform 2	← East Rail line towards Admiralty (Sheung Shui)
L1; D	Footbridge	Footbridge to Futian Port in Shenzhen, mainland China
L1; D	Departure hall	Hong Kong Immigration Department and Customs Checkpoints, shops
L1; D	Lower concourse	Fare adjustment, shops, automatic teller machines, washrooms
G	Ground level	Exits, Lok Ma Chau station public transport interchange

=== Exits ===
Exit	Pictures	Destinations	Note
Exit A		Ha Wan Village, Lok Ma Chau Spur Line Public Transport Interchange	Only inbound passengers who enter Hong Kong and take KMB Route B1, New Territories GMB Route 75, taxis, or those who hold a restricted area paper or who are approved by the Police to go to Ha Wan Village can use this entrance and exit.; Only outbound passengers who take KMB Route B1, New Territories GMB Route 75, taxis, or outbound passengers who are approved by the Police to go to Futian Port from Ha Wan Estate to mainland China can use this entrance.; Non-outbound passengers are not allowed to take the East Rail Line from public transport interchanges to stations unless they hold a restricted area paper or obtain approval from the Police.; Non-outbound passengers are not allowed to use this entrance and exit to go to Ha Wan Estate or the Public Transport Interchange unless they hold a restricted area paper or obtain approval from the Police.
Departure Exit		Immigration Department Departure Hall, Futian Port Shenzhen Metro Line 4 & Line 10 Futian Checkpoint station	Only holders of valid travel documents are allowed to use this entrance.
Arrival Exit		Arrival only	Only holders of valid travel documents are allowed to use this entrance.

== Lok Ma Chau Spur Line Control Point ==
The Lok Ma Chau Spur Line Control Point (Chinese: 落馬洲支線管制站) is an immigration control point connected with the Lok Ma Chau station. It is the second control point along the land border of Hong Kong to have a railway access, after the Lo Wu Control Point. The control point is connected via a pedestrian footbridge to the Futian Port, an immigration port of entry of the PRC, and from there to Shenzhen Metro's Futian Checkpoint station.

The control point was opened on 15 August 2007 together with the opening of the KCR Lok Ma Chau Spur Line between Lok Ma Chau and Sheung Shui station. The crossing consists of a cable-stay double-deck pedestrian bridge across the Sham Chun River, which forms the border between Hong Kong and the rest of the PRC. The lower deck handles pedestrians heading from Hong Kong to Futian Port, while the upper deck handles those coming from Futian Port to Hong Kong. Immigration facilities are located within the station building on both ends of the bridge. Electricity to the Hong Kong half of the bridge is provided by CLP Power, and Hong Kong's jurisdiction and law enforcement on the bridge also terminate at the midpoint, as on the Lo Wu Bridge.

The control point is open between 06:30 and 22:30, unlike the 24-hour vehicle Lok Ma Chau Control Point nearby. Later pedestrian crossing can be made at Lo Wu Control Point, until 00:00.

Although the Lok Ma Chau Spur Line Control Point is often referred to as a railway crossing, it is in fact a pedestrian crossing, unlike the Lo Wu Control Point, where no bus or any other public transport can reach. Furthermore, there is no through-train service, as the railway line is not connected with the railways in mainland China. And although the bulk of the users are train passengers, the Lok Ma Chau pedestrian crossing can also be reached by bus, taxi and mini bus from various parts of the New Territories.

The Lok Ma Chau transport interchange is located to the east of Lok Ma Chau station and is connected with the station via footbridges. The entrance and exit between the station and the interchange are guarded by the police as the area is located within the Frontier Closed Area.

The checkpoint has 2 road public transport services both to/from the West (MTR trains to the checkpoint run to/from the East). Those road services are:

- KMB Bus route B1
- Green minibus route 75

Both run to/from Yuen Long town centre from where other destinations in Western New Territories can be reached by road and rail. Among public transport destinations from Yuen Long is also bus 968 to Hong Kong Island via the Western Harbour Crossing.

Bus B1 and green minibus 75 operate via San Tin PTI. San Tin PTI offers many more connections than Lok Ma Chau Spur Line Checkpoint. KMB bus routes 76K, 276B, B1, N73, A43P, R41, X43, 178R (R41, X43 and 178R available Events Only) and all serve San Tin Public Transport Interchange.

== See also ==
- Lo Wu Control Point
