= Lok Ma Chau Village =

Village in Hong Kong

Coordinates: 22.513284°N 114.079721°E

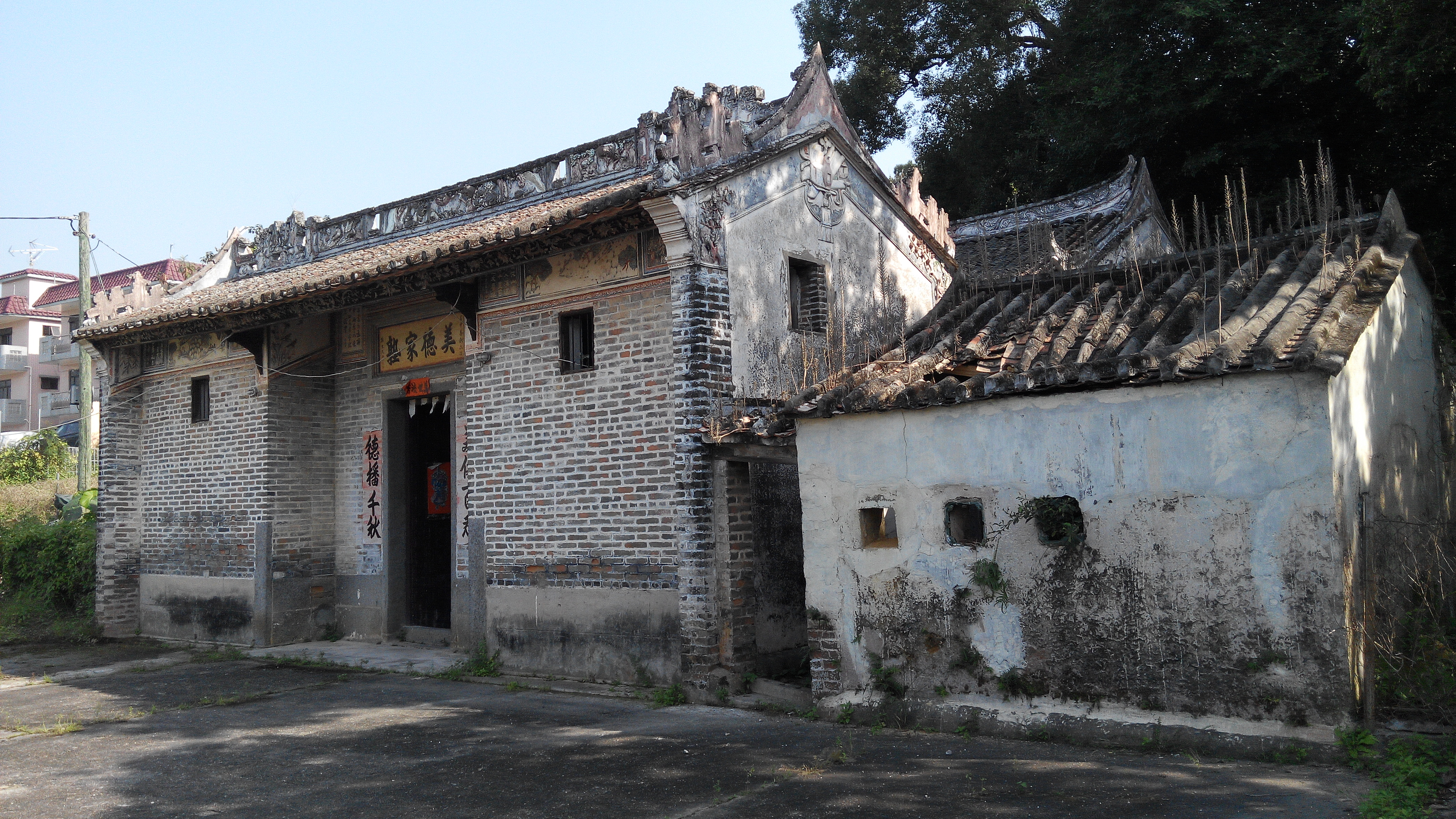
Mi Tak Study Hall and its ancillary building in Lok Ma Chau Village.

Lok Ma Chau Village or Lok Ma Chau Tsuen (Chinese: 落馬洲村) is a village in the Lok Ma Chau area of Yuen Long District, Hong Kong.

== Administration ==
Lok Ma Chau Village is a recognized village under the New Territories Small House Policy.

== History ==
The Cheung clan originated from Dongguan in Guangdong province and settled in Lok Ma Chau Village about 500 years ago.

== Features ==
The Mi Tak Study Hall (美德家塾) and its ancillary building in Lok Ma Chau Village have been listed as Grade II historic buildings.

== See also ==
- Ha Wan Tsuen, another village in the Lok Ma Chau area
