= Lok Ma Chau =

Village in New Territories, Hong Kong

Coordinates: 22°30′34″N 114°4′26″E

- Traditional Chinese: 落馬洲
- Simplified Chinese: 落马洲
Transcriptions
Standard Mandarin
- Hanyu Pinyin: Luòmǎzhōu
Yue: Cantonese
- Jyutping: lok6 maa5 zau1

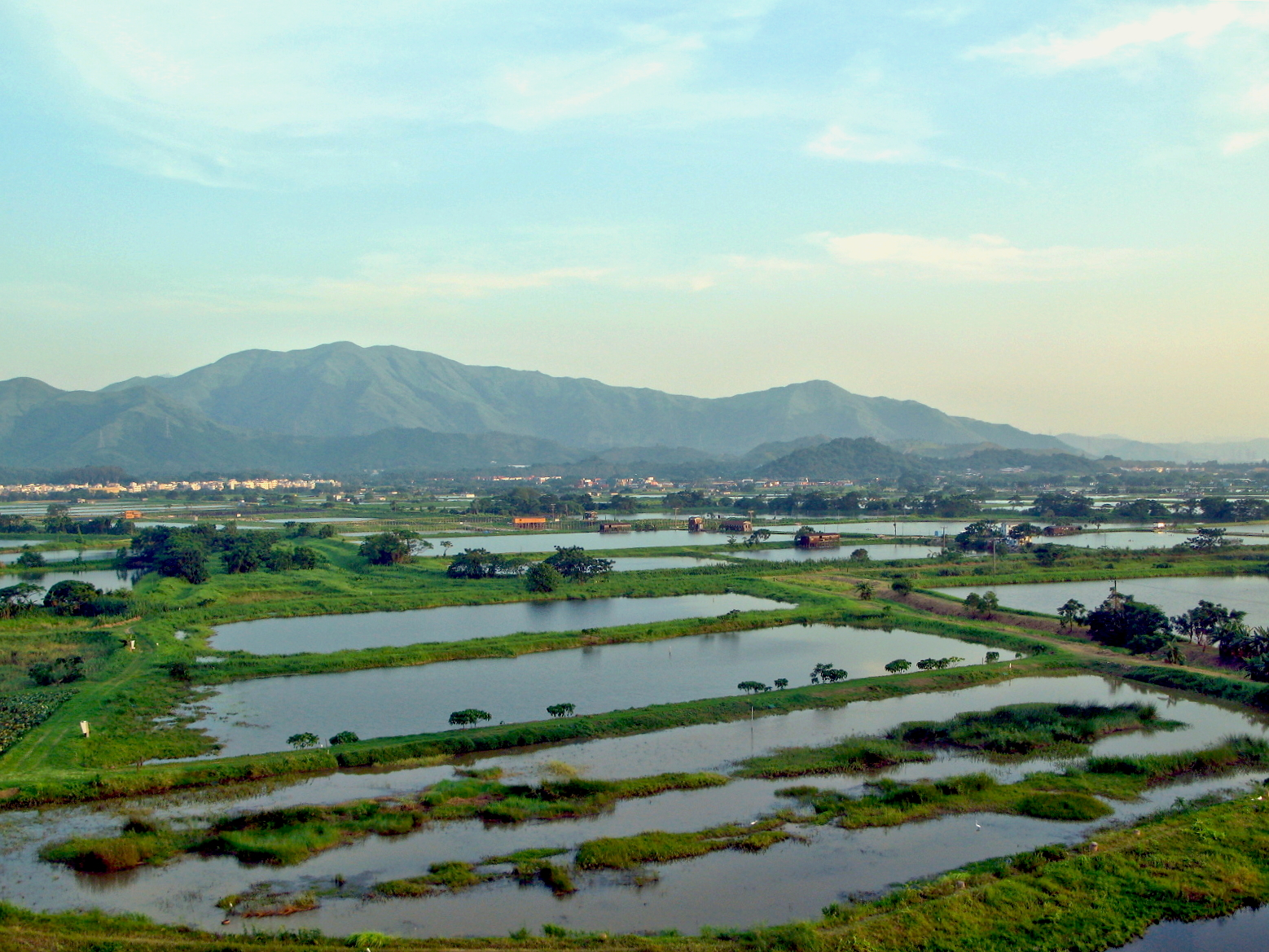
Most of the area in Lok Ma Chau is wetland. The Kai Kung Leng mountain range of Hong Kong is visible in the background.

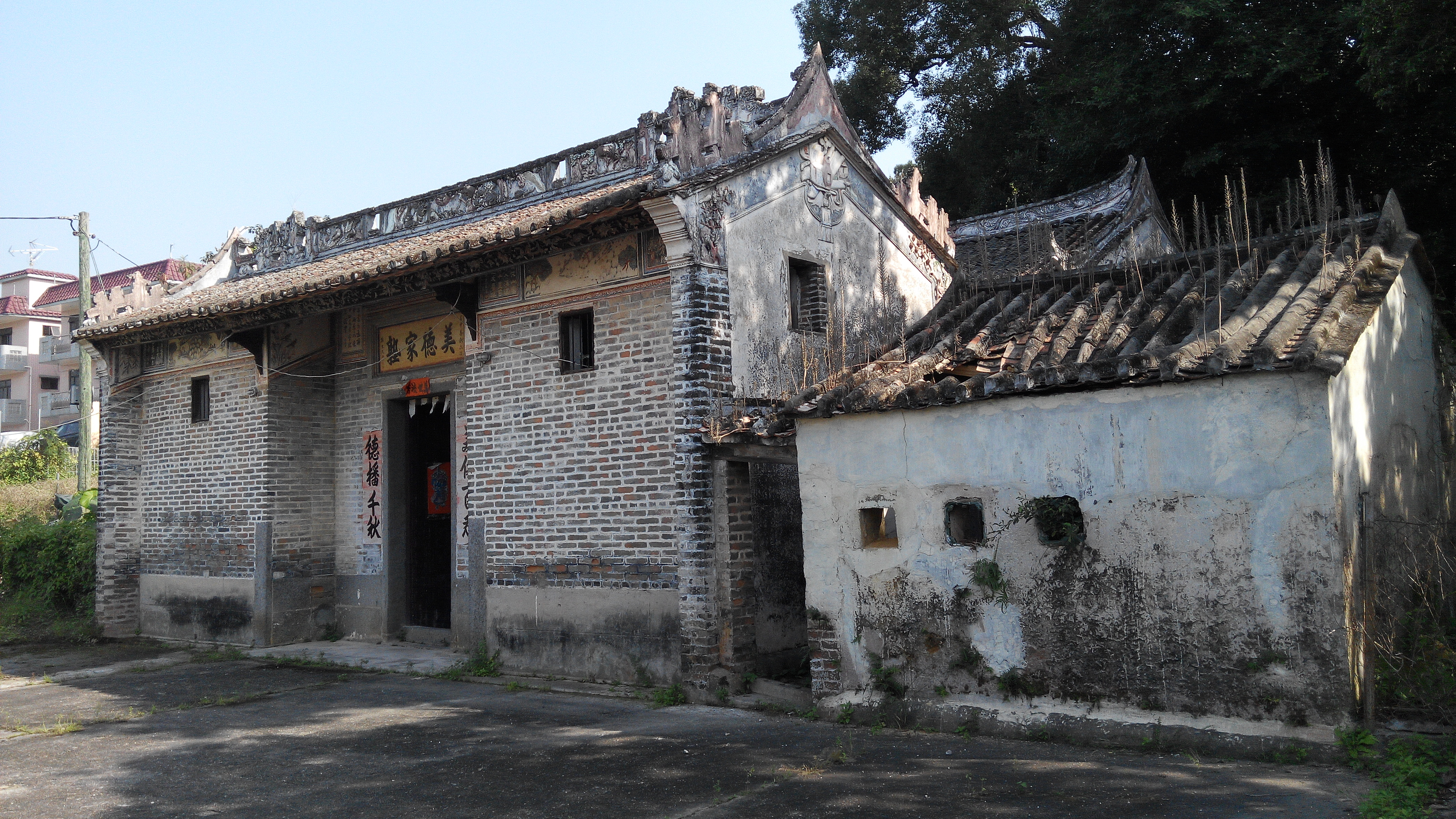
Mi Tak Study Hall and its ancillary building in Lok Ma Chau Village.

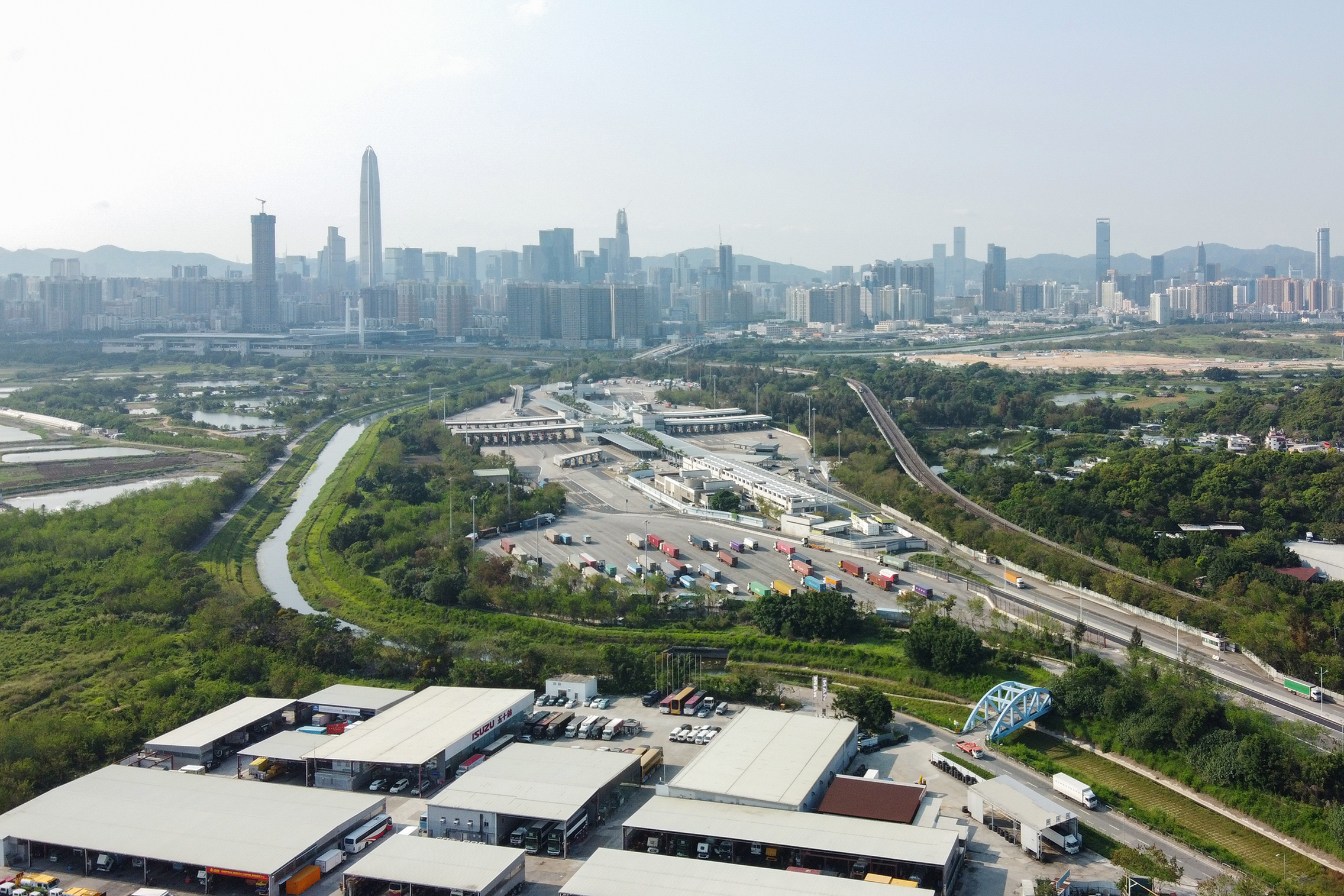
Lok Ma Chau Control Point, with the Shenzhen skyline in the background.

Lok Ma Chau or Lokmachau is an area in New Territories, Hong Kong. It is the site of a major pedestrian (linked directly to the Hong Kong MTR) and road border crossing point between Hong Kong and mainland China. Administratively, most of the Lok Ma Chau area is located within the Yuen Long District of Hong Kong.

== Geography ==
Lok Ma Chau lies just south of the Sham Chun River (or Shenzhen River in Mandarin), which forms the border between Hong Kong and mainland China. Lok Ma Chau lies opposite Huanggang in Shenzhen, China.

Lok Ma Chau lies within Hong Kong's Frontier Closed Area, a buffer zone established by the Hong Kong government to prevent illegal immigration from mainland China, and access to the area is restricted to those holding Closed Area Permits. Those who are crossing the border to or from China do not need permits but must leave the area immediately after completing immigration procedures.

To the southwest of Lok Ma Chau is the Mai Po Wetlands.

== Lok Ma Chau Loop ==
Following the river straightening efforts on the Sham Chun River, Lok Ma Chau Loop, which was once previously linked to Shenzhen adjoined Hong Kong. Consequently, it was officially incorporated into Hong Kong's jurisdiction in 2017.

The proposed Lok Ma Chau Loop Innovation and Technology Park is located just east of the border post and will be expected to generate up to 1.2 million square metres of additional office space when completed.

== Lok Ma Chau Village ==
The Cheung clan originated from Dongguan in Guangdong province and settled in Lok Ma Chau Village about 500 years ago.

== Education ==
Lok Ma Chau is in Primary One Admission (POA) School Net 74. Within the school net are multiple aided schools (operated independently but funded with government money) and one government school: Yuen Long Government Primary School (元朗官立小學).

== Facilities ==
- Lok Ma Chau Control Point
- Lok Ma Chau station

== See also ==
- Ha Wan Tsuen, another village in the Lok Ma Chau area
