= Lok Ma Chau Loop =

Unincorporated area in Hong Kong

Coordinates: 22°31′15.64″N 114°4′49.6″E

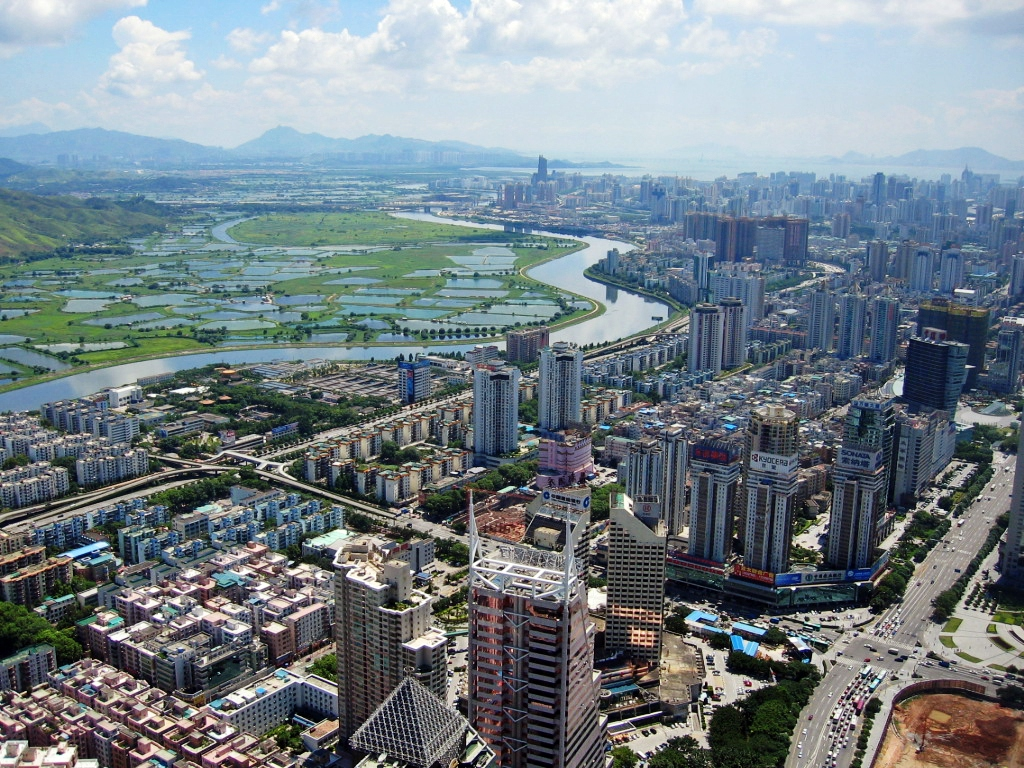
- Shenzhen (right) and the Lok Ma Chau Loop (centre left)
- Traditional Chinese: 落馬洲河套地區
- Simplified Chinese: 落马洲河套地区
Transcriptions
Standard Mandarin
- Hanyu Pinyin: Luò Mǎ Zhōu Hétào Dìqū
Yue: Cantonese
- Jyutping: lok6 maa5 zau1 ho4 tou3 dei6 keoi1

Hong Kong-Shenzhen Innovation and Technology Park
- Traditional Chinese: 港深創新及科技園
- Simplified Chinese: 港深创新及科技园
Transcriptions
Standard Mandarin
- Hanyu Pinyin: Gǎng-Shēn Chuàngxīn Jí Kējì Yuán
Yue: Cantonese
- Jyutping: gong2 sam1 cong3 san1 kap6 fo1 gei6 jyun4

The Lok Ma Chau Loop is a small piece of riverside land transferred to Hong Kong by Mainland China in 1997. It became the development site for the Hong Kong-Shenzhen Innovation and Technology Park. It is serving as a flagship “One Zone, Two Parks” project focused on advanced R&D, education, and creative industries. Development is proceeding in multiple phases.

== History ==
Until the late 1990s, the Lok Ma Chau Loop was a part of Mainland China. When some engineering work was done to straighten the winding Sham Chun River, the natural border moved north and effectively left the landmass of the loop only accessible from Hong Kong. Dispute of ownership of the land continued until recent years. However, when the Hong Kong-Shenzhen Innovation and Technology Park (HKSITP) was announced, an agreement concerning the technology park led to the resolution of the land dispute, with the Lok Ma Chau Loop having been transferred to Hong Kong.

== Political status ==
With a land area of only 0.97 km^{2}, the Lok Ma Chau Loop is currently the only unincorporated area in Hong Kong. Because every piece of land in Mainland China belongs to a county-level (third level) administrative division, this makes the Lok Ma Chau Loop the only unincorporated area under the jurisdiction of the People's Republic of China.

Eddie Chu, a Member of the Legislative Council of Hong Kong, lodged an inquiry to various local authorities on 29 March 2019, urging them to take the necessary steps to incorporate the Lok Ma Chau Loop into one of the 18 districts of Hong Kong.

In June 2025, the Hong Kong government gazetted the inclusion of the Lok Ma Chau Loop into the New Territories North constituency (LC7), and later presented the proposal to the Legislative Council for review. Once part of the constituency, the Loop will cease to be an unincorporated area within the Hong Kong SAR, signifying its full integration into Hong Kong's establishment.

== Hong Kong-Shenzhen Innovation and Technology Park ==
The Hong Kong-Shenzhen Innovation and Technology Park is a proposed new hi-tech development at the border between Hong Kong and Shenzhen, China. It is located in Hong Kong's New Territories near the area of Lok Ma Chau, adjacent to the Sham Chun River.

The development of the technology park was announced on 3 January 2017 during a joint ceremony by the governments of Hong Kong and Shenzhen, when a memorandum of understanding was signed. When completed, it will be the largest technology park in Hong Kong with a land area of 87 hectares.

=== Details of the development ===
Once developed, the technology park is expected to provide 1.2 million square metres of additional office spaces to be used by Hong Kong and Shenzhen companies.

The technology park is expected to be managed by the Hong Kong Science and Technology Parks Corporation.

=== Criticism ===
==== Environmental ====
The proposed park is located in a current green land area, a buffer zone between the urban agglomerations of Shenzhen and Hong Kong. Environmental groups claim the park is located in an important flightpath for migratory birds. The wetlands form an ecosystem that continues west along Sham Chun River and the development may thus affect Deep Bay. The Hong Kong wetland park and the Mai Po Marshes are also along this route. The groups estimate the loss of 4,000 trees, 11 hectares of reed marsh and 9 hectares of ponds.

In addition, it is thought that the current marsh land site contains significant amounts of contaminated mud which may pose an environmental risk and a challenge to decontaminate.

==== Rationale ====
Hong Kong has two existing high-profile business and technology parks, Cyberport on Hong Kong Island and Science Park, also in the New Territories. Both were conceived in the wake of the 1997 Asia financial crisis in order to boost technology investments, but their uptake has been slow and is only just starting to come to fruition. Cyberport especially has been marred with image problems, starting from its delayed development to its lack of commercial success.

Lok Ma Chau loop has been claimed to be at risk of falling into some of the same traps as Cyberport. On the other hand, some local business groups welcome the technology park, but are mindful of lessons that can be gleaned from previous technology park developments.

Questions have been raised whether the true ambition of the government is to support the technology industry, or to obtain land for profitable real estate development.

== Alternative use ==
During the COVID-19 pandemic in Hong Kong, the site was developed to host an isolation and treatment centre as part of the Omicron variant surge in early 2022. A temporary bridge connection Hong Kong and Shenzhen was erected to facilitate the free flow of workers and construction materials. The site is intended to be providing 50,000 beds, staffed also by care workers from mainland China.
