= Ha Wan Tsuen =

Coordinates: 22.515084°N 114.073742°E

Route 75 green minibus at Ha Wan Tsuen.

Ha Wan Tsuen (Chinese: 下灣村) is a village in the Lok Ma Chau area of Yuen Long District, Hong Kong.

== See also ==
- Lok Ma Chau Village, another village in the Lok Ma Chau area
