= Sham Chun River =

River and natural border between Hong Kong and mainland China

Sham Chun River 深圳河
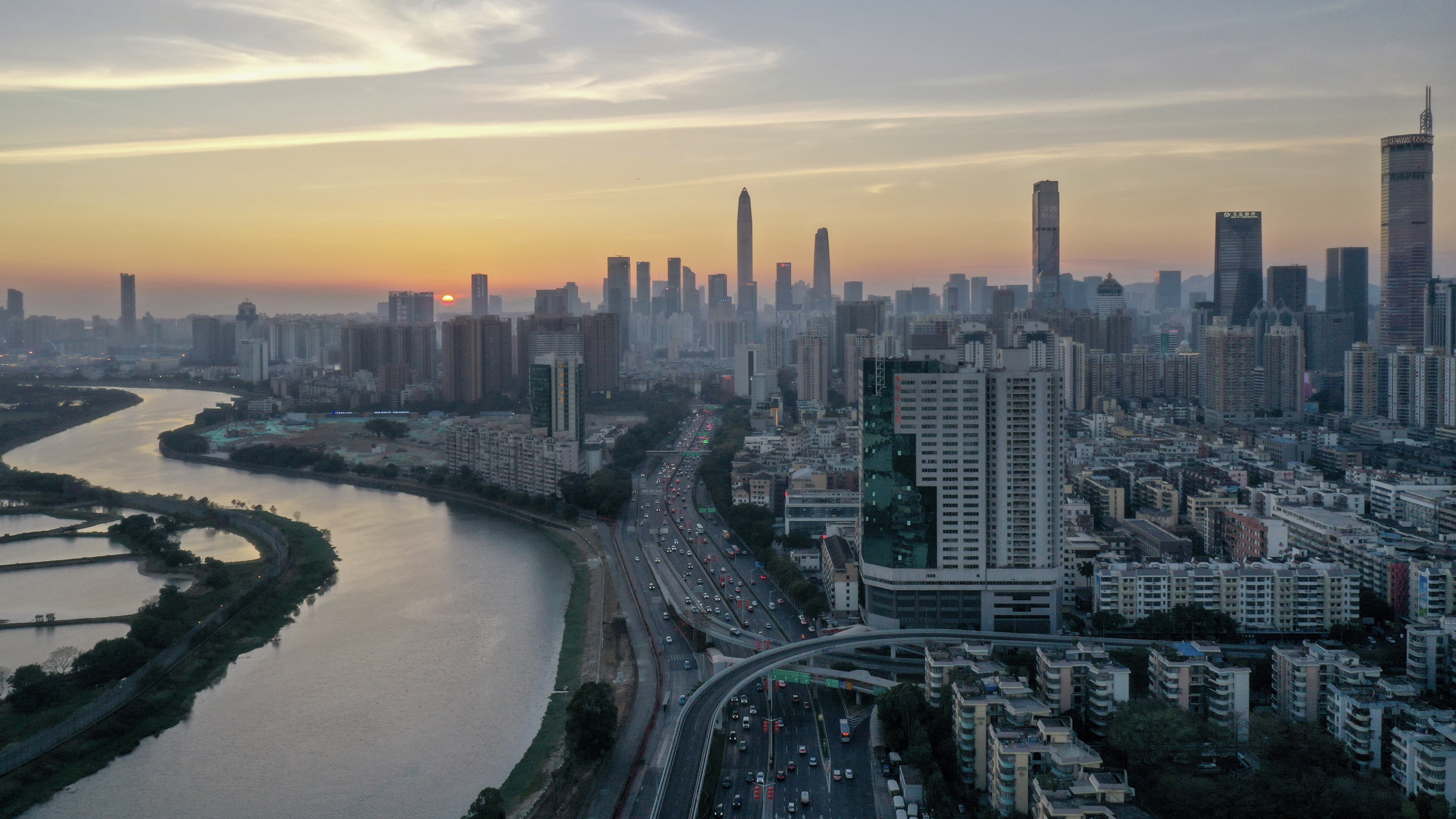
- The river seen from Luohu District in Shenzhen

Location
- Cities: Hong Kong (China) Shenzhen

Physical characteristics
- Source
  - location: Wutong Mountain
  - coordinates: 22°34′56″N 114°12′52″E
- Mouth
  - location: Shenzhen Bay
  - coordinates: 22°30′N 114°02′E
- Length: 37 km (23 mi)
- Basin size: 312.5 km^{2} (120.7 sq mi)

Sham Chun River
- Chinese: 深圳河
- Postal: Shamchun or Shumchun River
Transcriptions
Standard Mandarin
- Hanyu Pinyin: Shēnzhèn Hé
Hakka
- Romanization: cim^{1} zun^{4} ho^{2}
Yue: Cantonese
- Yale Romanization: sām jan hòh
- Jyutping: sam^{1} zan^{3} ho^{4}
- IPA: [sɐ́m tsɐ̄n hɔ̏ː]

The Sham Chun River or Shenzhen River (Chinese: 深圳河; pinyin: Shēnzhèn Hé; Jyutping: sam1 zan3 ho4) serves as the natural border between Hong Kong and mainland China, together with Deep Bay, Mirs Bay, and the Sha Tau Kok River.

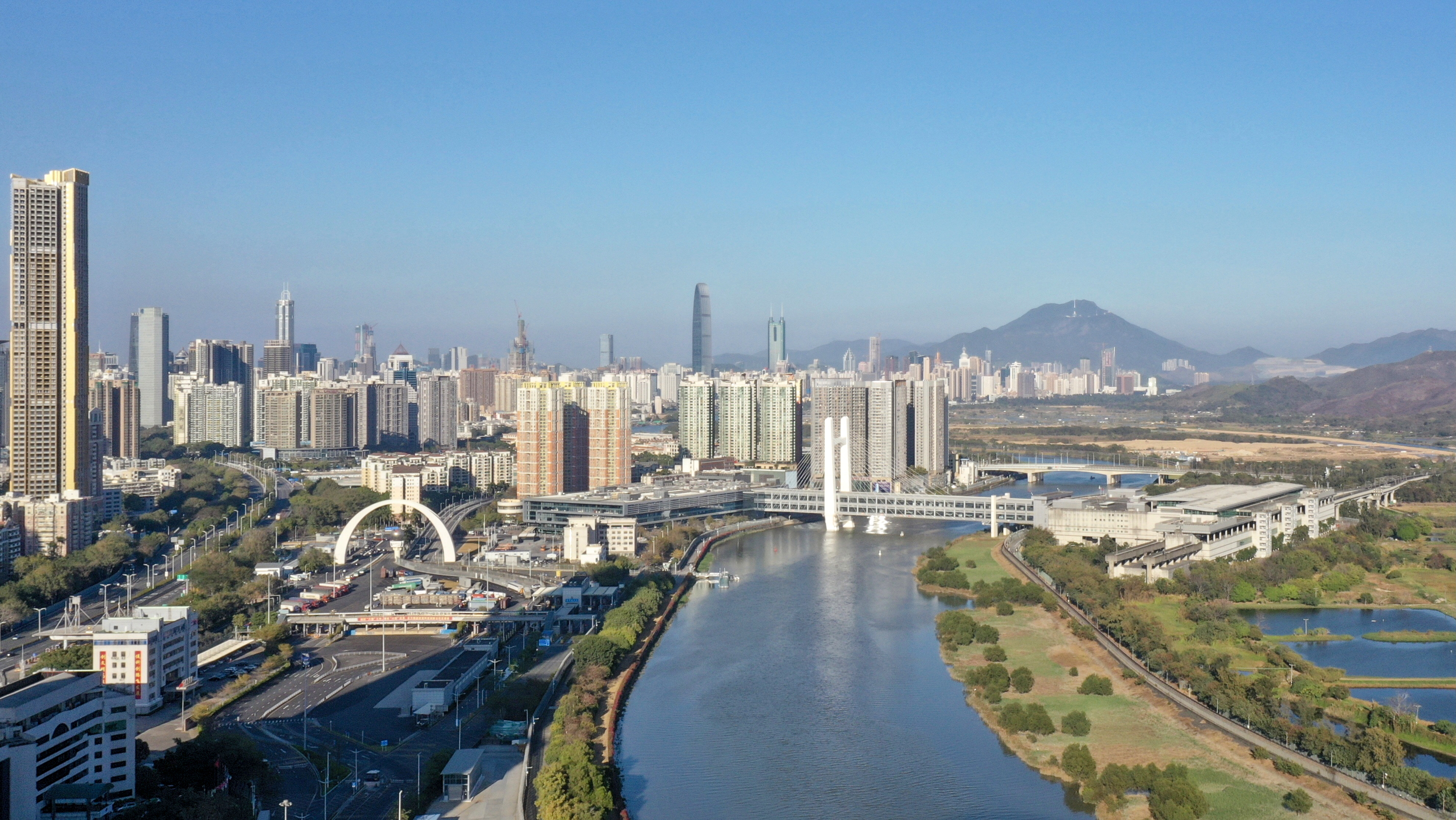
City of Shenzhen and Yuen Long, Hong Kong, divided by the Sham Chun River

It formed a part of the limit of the lease of the New Territories in 1898 in the Convention for the Extension of Hong Kong Territory (known also as the Second Convention of Peking).

It separates Yuen Long District, North District of Hong Kong, and the city of Shenzhen, Guangdong. Its source is at Wutong Mountain, Shenzhen. Its tributaries includes Ping Yuen River, Shek Sheung River, Sheung Yue River, Ng Tung River, Buji River and Tan Shan River. The Shenzhen Reservoir also flows into the river when it is full.

The river flows into Deep Bay (also known as Hau Hoi Wan and Shenzhen Bay). The Mai Po Marshes is at its estuary.

Efforts have been made to alleviate flooding and pollution problems through river draining, which produced the Lok Ma Chau Loop.

== River crossings ==
- International Bridge near Lin Ma Hang–Changling
- Heung Yuen Wai Control Point–Liantang Port
- Cement factory near Nga Yiu
- Bridge near Kaw Liu–Luofang
- Man Kam To Control Point–Wenjindu Port
- Lo Wu Control Point–Luohu Port
- Lo Wu Bridge (railway bridge)
- Lok Ma Chau Control Point–Huanggang Port
- Lok Ma Chau Spur Line Control Point–Futian Port
- XRL Hong Kong Section–Mainland Section within Shenzhen (tunnel across Sham Chun River)

== See also ==
- Frontier Closed Area – the closed border zone on the Hong Kong side of the river
- List of rivers and nullahs in Hong Kong
