= Lok Ma Chau Control Point =

Border crossing in Lok Ma Chau, Hong Kong

- 落馬洲管制站
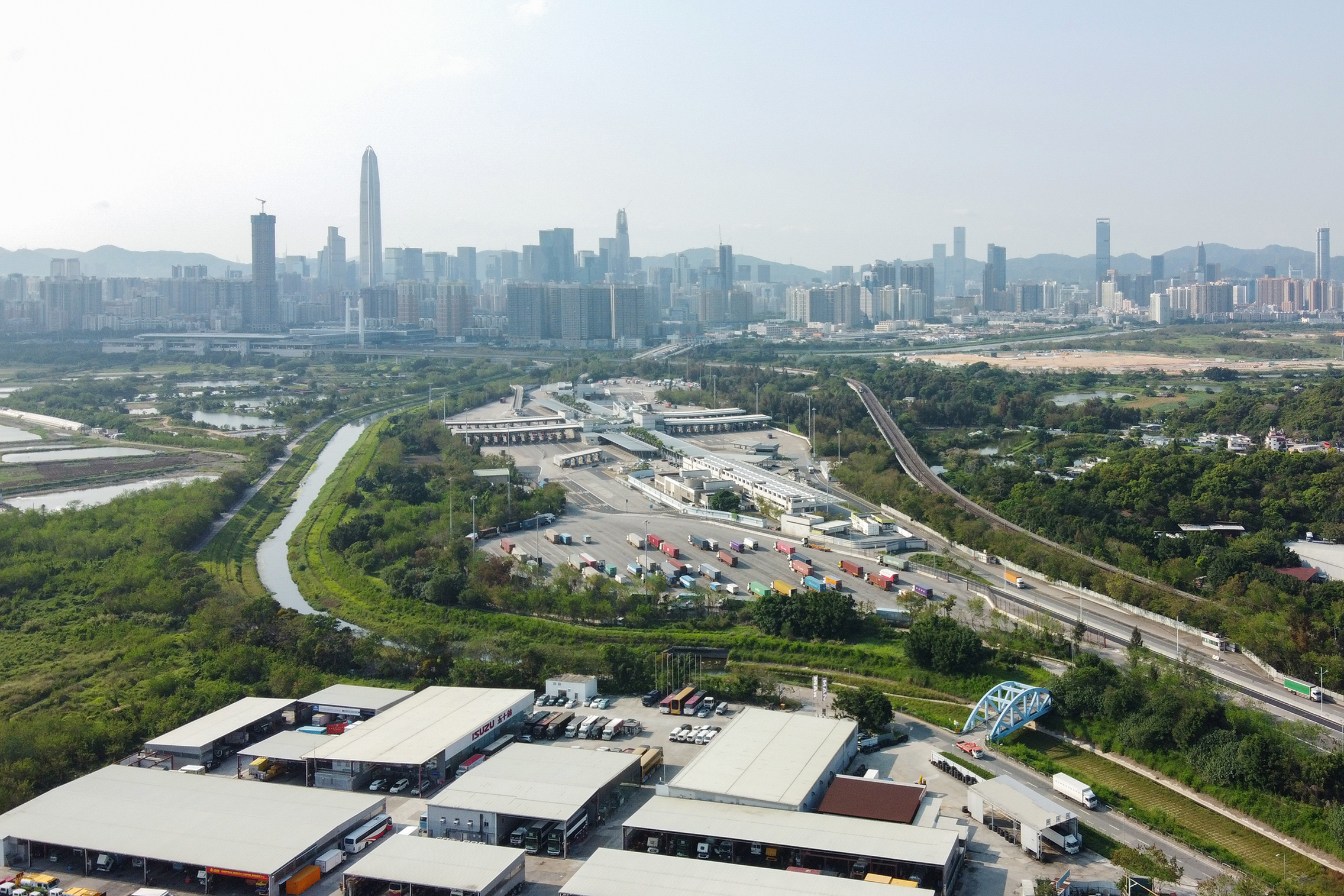
- Lok Ma Chau Control Point from Hong Kong side

General information
- Type: Border control
- Location: Lok Ma Chau, New Territories, Hong Kong
- Coordinates: 22.52074°N 114.07496°E
- Opened: 1989
- Closed: 12 October 2026; 20 days ago (Passenger inspection, except for traveling to and from Futian Bonded Zone)
- Operator: Customs and Excise Department, Immigration Department

Website
- td.gov.hk
- Coordinates: 22°30′32″N 114°04′26″E
- Carries: Pedestrians, Vehicles, Containers, Cargo
- Crosses: Frontier Closed Area

Statistics
- Toll: No toll

Location
- Interactive map of Lok Ma Chau Control Point

Lok Ma Chau Control Point
- Traditional Chinese: 落馬洲管制站
- Simplified Chinese: 落马洲管制站
- Jyutping: lok6 maa5 zau1 gun2 zai3 zaam6
Transcriptions
Standard Mandarin
- Hanyu Pinyin: Luòmǎzhōu Guǎnzhìzhàn
Yue: Cantonese
- Jyutping: lok6 maa5 zau1 gun2 zai3 zaam6

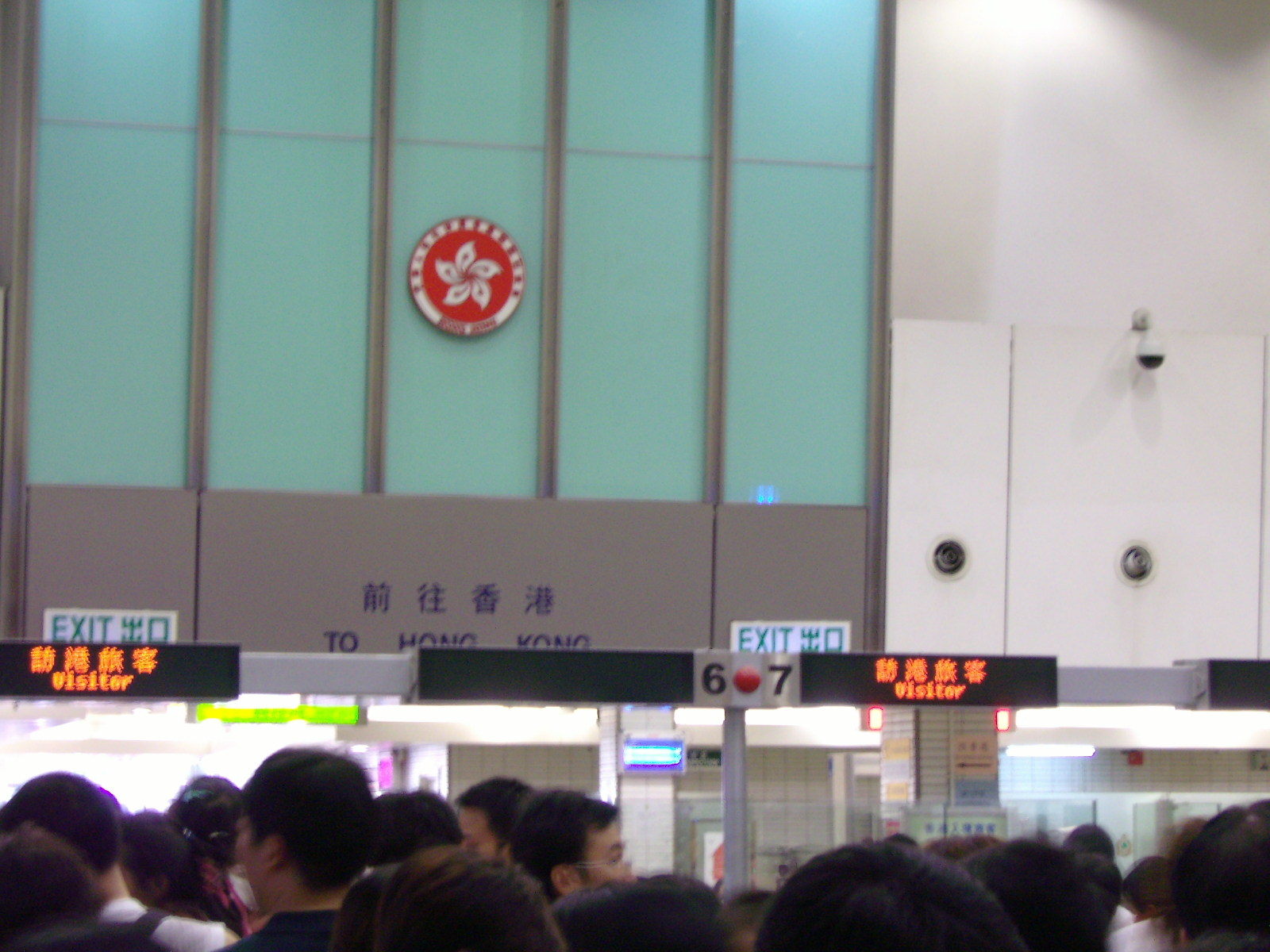
Hong Kong-side counters in Lok Ma Chau Control Point

Lok Ma Chau Control Point (Chinese: 落馬洲管制站) is an immigration control point in Lok Ma Chau, Yuen Long District, New Territories, Hong Kong, which is on the border between Hong Kong and mainland China. It opened in 1989 as the third road crossing between the then British dependent territory and China. It started providing 24-hour passenger clearance in January 2003, and is still the only Hong Kong control point with Shenzhen in mainland China to do so. Its counterpart is the Huanggang Port in mainland China, across Sham Chun River and interconnected by the Lok Ma Chau Bridge.

Before reaching this point, vehicles must pass through police checkpoints along San Sham Road to Lok Ma Chau Control Point. Permits must be carried in order to pass these points and to travel to the control points.

== History ==
Lok Ma Chau Control Point was the third road crossing built between Hong Kong and Guangdong, after Man Kam To and Sha Tau Kok. It was built as part of the New Territories Circular Road project, and was intended to relieve the congested Man Kam To Control Point. Construction began in December 1985. Customs, police, and other buildings were designed by the Architectural Services Department. The new crossing opened on 29 December 1989, initially only using the Eastern Bridge, providing two lanes. The Western Bridge was opened to traffic on 18 October 1991, adding two more lanes.

In October 1993, Governor Chris Patten announced a plan to open the crossing on a 24-hour basis. This was strongly supported by the territory's business community, but criticised by villagers due to increased noise and dust pollution. Overnight border crossing was introduced on 4 November 1994 (i.e. after 3 November 1994). The control point began providing 24-hour passenger clearance from 27 January 2003 (i.e. after 26 January 2003).

Construction of a new four-lane bridge, directly to the east of the existing two bridges, was proposed by the government in early 2003 to meet increasing traffic demand. Construction began in November 2003 and was completed in December 2004. The new bridge opened to traffic in January 2005.

Due to the COVID-19 pandemic, the Lok Ma Chau Control Point was closed between February 4, 2020 until February 6, 2023.

At 6:30 a.m. on 12 October 2026, with the new Huanggang Port officially commencing operations, Lok Ma Chau Control Point ceased operations for passenger inspection. However, it still retains the inspection for the Futian Free Trade Zone..

== Statistics ==
In 2015, Lok Ma Chau Control Point handled a total of 37 million people (including both drivers and passengers), making it the second-busiest road control point in Hong Kong, after Shenzhen Bay Control Point (which handled 41.5 million). For comparison, the nearby Lok Ma Chau Spur Line rail crossing handled 61.9 million.

== Public transport ==
=== Shuttle bus from Lok Ma Chau Control Point ===
Cross border shuttle buses between Huanggang Port in Shenzhen and San Tin Public Transport Interchange (PTI) (less than 2 km from Lok Ma Chau Control Point), stop en route at Lok Ma Chau Control Point. These shuttle buses are scheduled to run at least every 15 minutes, 365 days per year. San Tin PTI offers connecting public transport across Hong Kong mostly but not exclusively within the New Territories.

With the new Huanggang Port will opened and commenced operation, all shuttle bus routes from Lok Ma Chau Control Point to old Huanggang Port will officially ceased operation and retired effective from 12 October 2026 after nearly 30 years serving Shenzhen and Hong Kong.

==== Franchised bus routes from San Tin PTI ====
- KMB 76K, 276B, N73

==== Green minibus routes from San Tin PTI ====
- NT 44B, 44B1, 75, 78, 79S, 605, 616S

==== Red minibus routes from San Tin PTI ====
- Un-numbered service to/from Kwun Tong (via Sha Tin, CUHK, Tai Po, Fanling, Sheung Shui). This infrequent service runs mostly as a night service.

=== Non-franchised bus routes from Lok Ma Chau Control Point ===
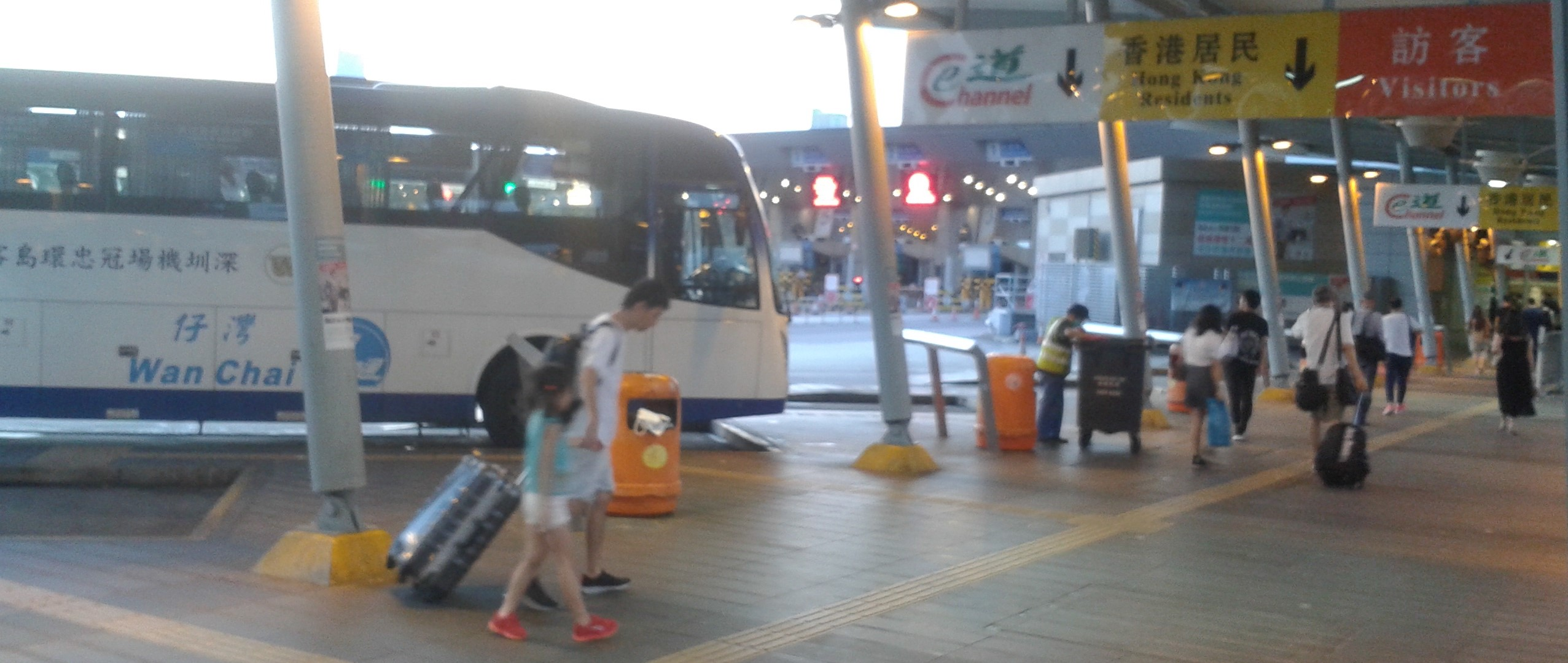
The unfranchised bus from Wan Chai dropping passengers at Lok Ma Chau Control Point.

The non-franchised buses bypass San Tin PTI direct to their destinations.

- Kwun Tong (Lam Tin station) to Huanggang Port
- Tsuen Wan (Discovery Park) to Huanggang Port
- Jordan (Austin Road) to Huanggang Port
- Wan Chai Ferry terminal and Shun Tak Centre to Huanggang Port
- Mong Kok (Arran Street) to Huanggang Port
- Kam Sheung Road station to Huanggang Port

=== Taxis ===
- NT Taxis
- Urban Taxis
