= Kam Tsin =

Coordinates: 22.500462°N 114.111995°E

- Traditional Chinese: 金錢
- Simplified Chinese: 金钱
Transcriptions
Standard Mandarin
- Hanyu Pinyin: Jīnqián
Yue: Cantonese
- Jyutping: gam1 cin4

Kam Tsin Tsuen
- Traditional Chinese: 金錢村
- Simplified Chinese: 金钱村
Transcriptions
Standard Mandarin
- Hanyu Pinyin: Jīnqián Cūn
Yue: Cantonese
- Jyutping: gam1 cin4 cyun1

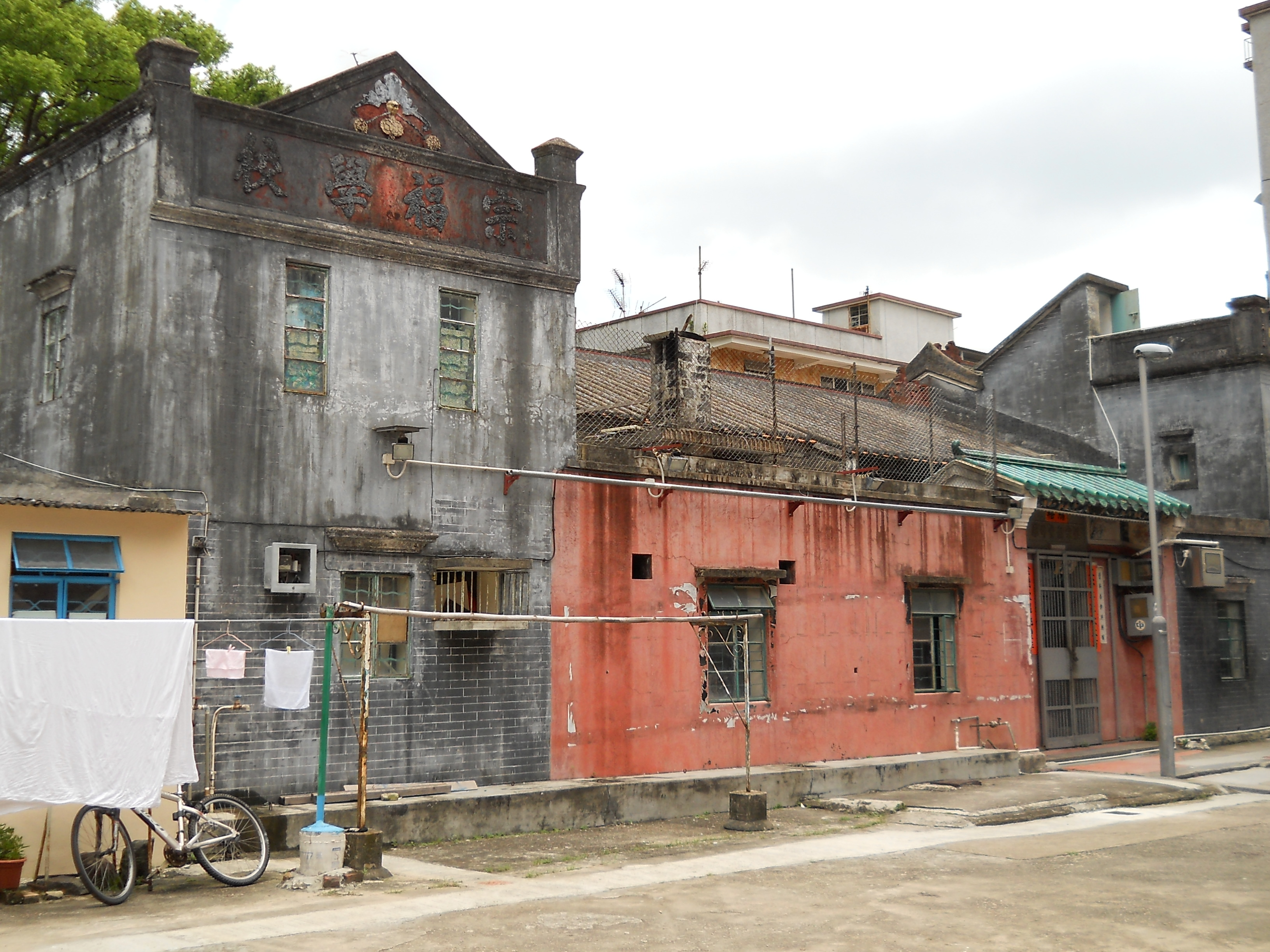
Hau Chung Fuk Tong Communal Hall in Kam Tsin.

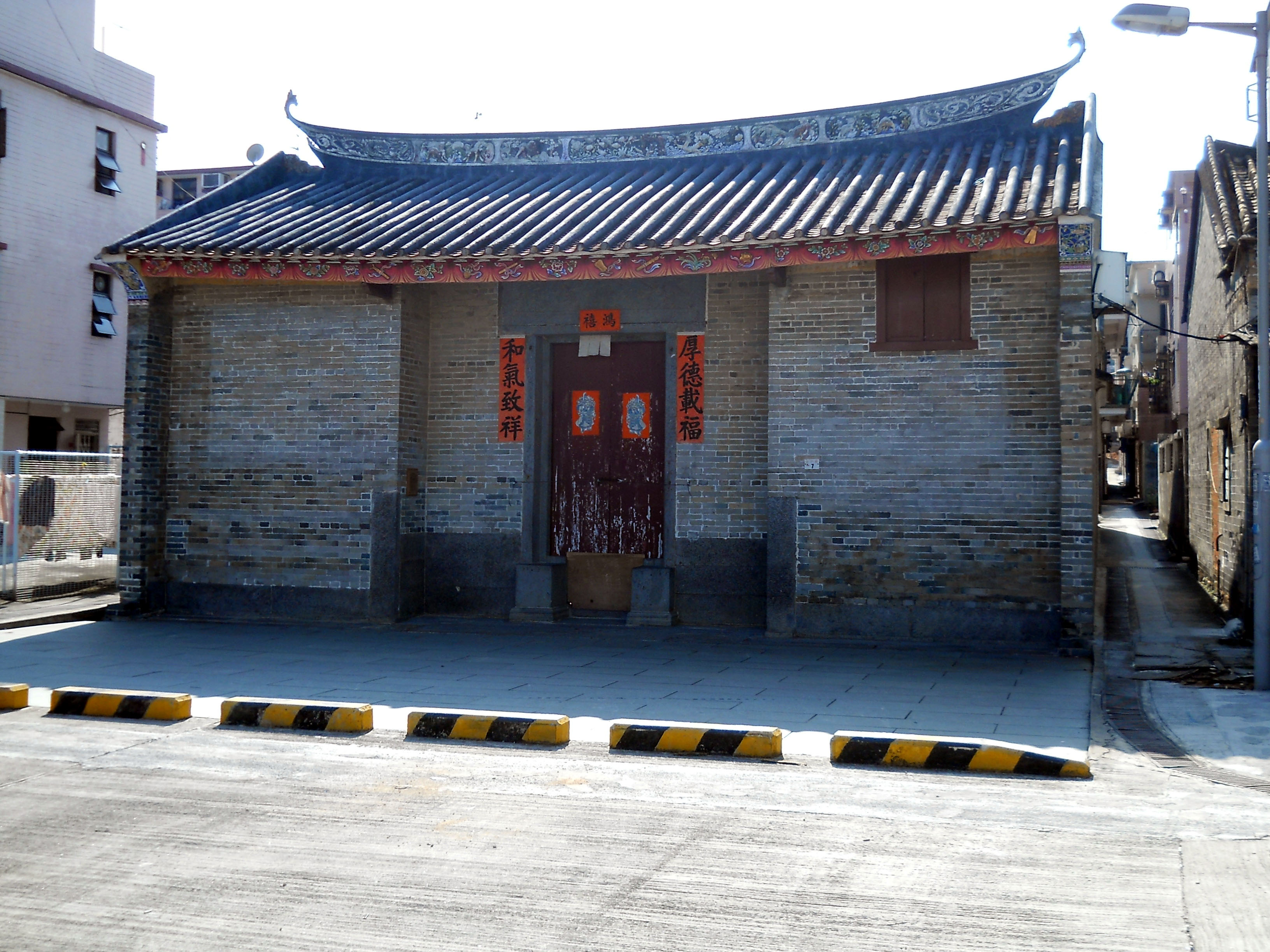
Hau Mei Fung Ancestral Hall.

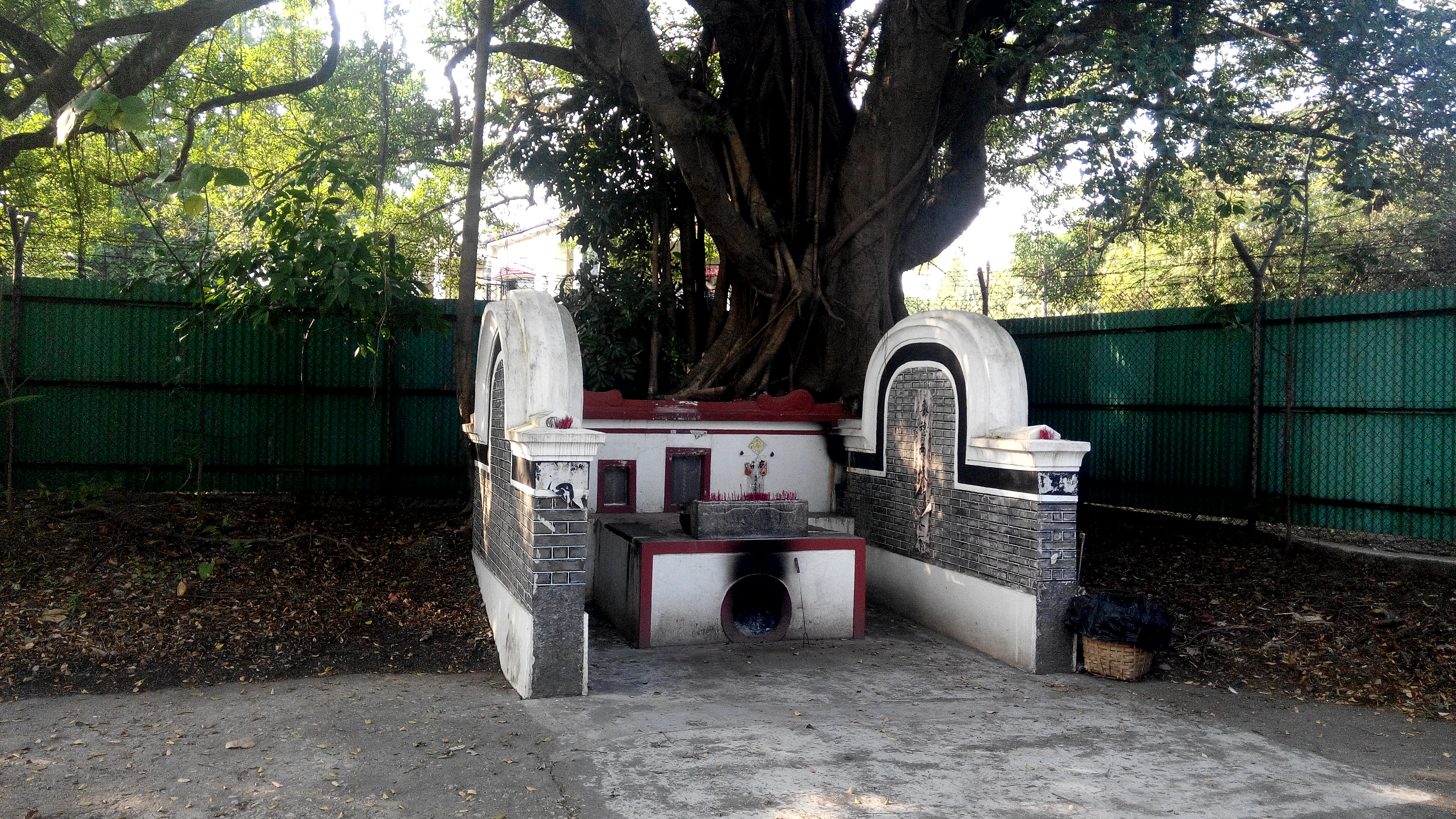
Earth God shrine of Kam Tsin.

Kam Tsin (Chinese: 金錢), also known as Kam Tsin Tsuen (金錢村), is a village and an area in the North District, in the New Territories in Hong Kong.

== Administration ==
Kam Tsin is a recognized village under the New Territories Small House Policy. It is one of the villages represented within the Sheung Shui District Rural Committee. For electoral purposes, Kam Tsin is part of the Sheung Shui Rural constituency, which is currently represented by Simon Hau Fuk-tat.

== Location ==
Kam Tsin is located south of Yin Kong, west of Kwu Tung, Ngau Tei and Hang Tau. Its south and east are surrounded by the Hong Kong Golf Club. The Fanling Bungalow and Fanling Lodge are on its southeast.

== History ==
The Hau (侯) Clan, one of the Five Great Clans of the New Territories, arrived in modern-day Hong Kong towards the end of the 12th century, during the Southern Song dynasty. They first settled at Ho Sheung Heung. They later settled three branch-villages: Yin Kong, Kam Tsin and Ping Kong.

In 1851, a war opposed the village of San Tin to Ping Kong and Kam Tsin.

== Features ==
The village contains two temples which are used by the native Hau clan to worship their ancestors. One of these temples is open to visitors at weekends and on public holidays. There are also two schools and a kindergarten next to it.

The Hau Mei Fung Ancestral Hall is a declared monument. The Earth God Shrine of Kam Tsin Tsuen and the Hau Chung Fuk Tong Communal Hall are listed as Grade II historic buildings.

== Transportation ==
Although Kam Tsin is by the side of Castle Peak Road and Fanling Highway nowadays, it is not connected to these roads directly. The access to the area is Kam Tsin Road, a branch road from Castle Peak Road.

Public transport access is by green minibus 50A from Sheung Shui station or by a red minibus to and from Sheung Shui which only runs in the mornings. One can also access Kowloon Motor Bus bus 76K and red minibus 17, plus other green minibus services by crossing a footbridge over Fanling Highway.

== Education ==
As of 2024 there are currently three schools operating in Kam Tsin.

- De La Salle Secondary School, N.T. (founded in 1965)
- Kam Tsin Village Ho Tung School (founded in 1955, successor of Chung Fuk Primary School founded in 1902)
- Kam Tsin Village Ho Tung Kindergarten (founded in 1976)
