= Five Great Clans of the New Territories =

Lineages in Hong Kong

- Chinese: 新界五大氏族
Transcriptions
Standard Mandarin
- Hanyu Pinyin: Xīnjiè Wǔ Dà Shìzú
Yue: Cantonese
- Jyutping: San^{1}gaai^{3} Ng^{5} Daai^{6} Si^{6}zuk^{6}

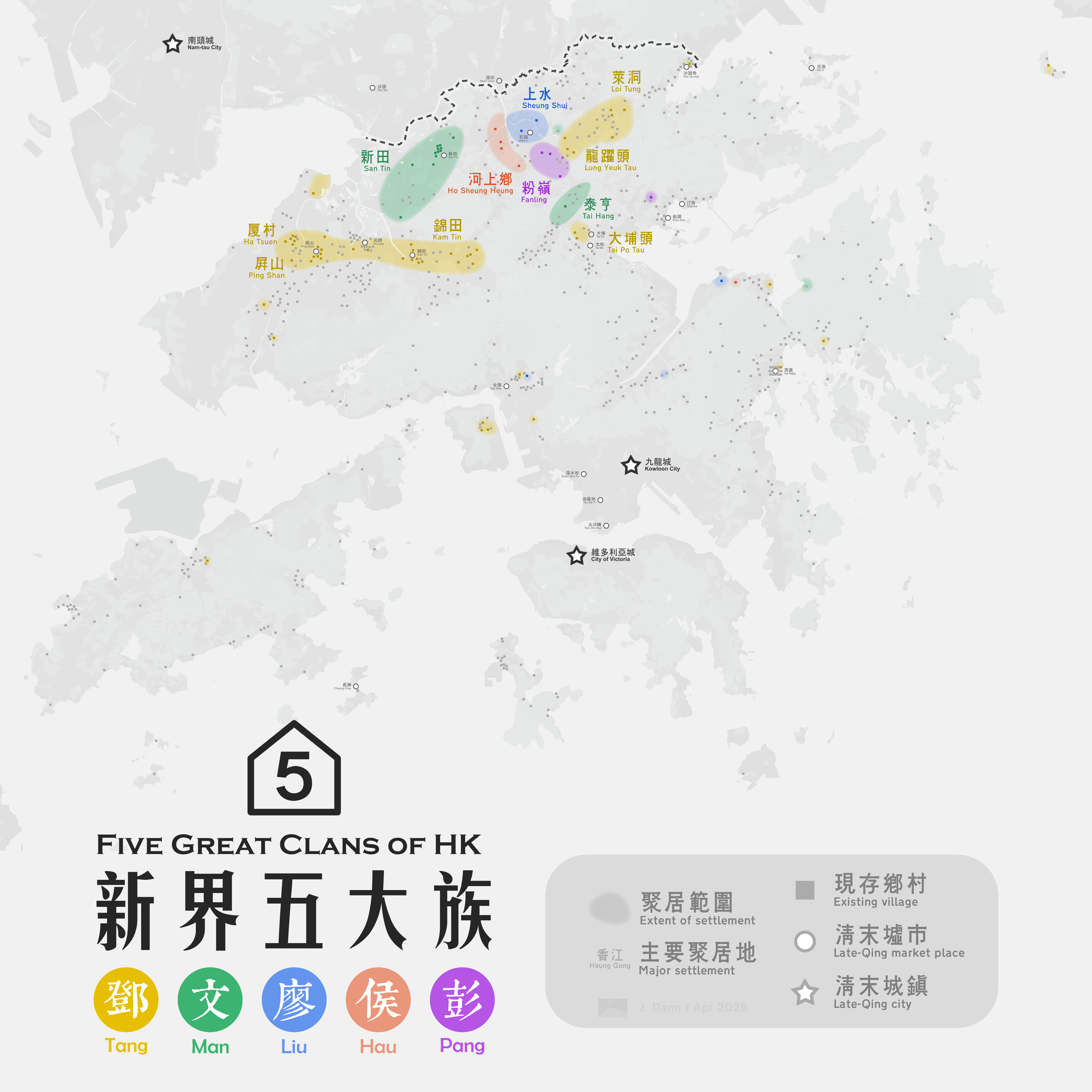
Approximate extent of settlement of the Five Great Clans, determined by the leader of the indigenous villages

The Five Great Clans of the New Territories are the five families that settled before the seventeenth century and became sizeable in the New Territories of Hong Kong.

They are the Tang (鄧), Man (文), Hau (侯), Pang (彭) and Liu (廖).

== Tang ==
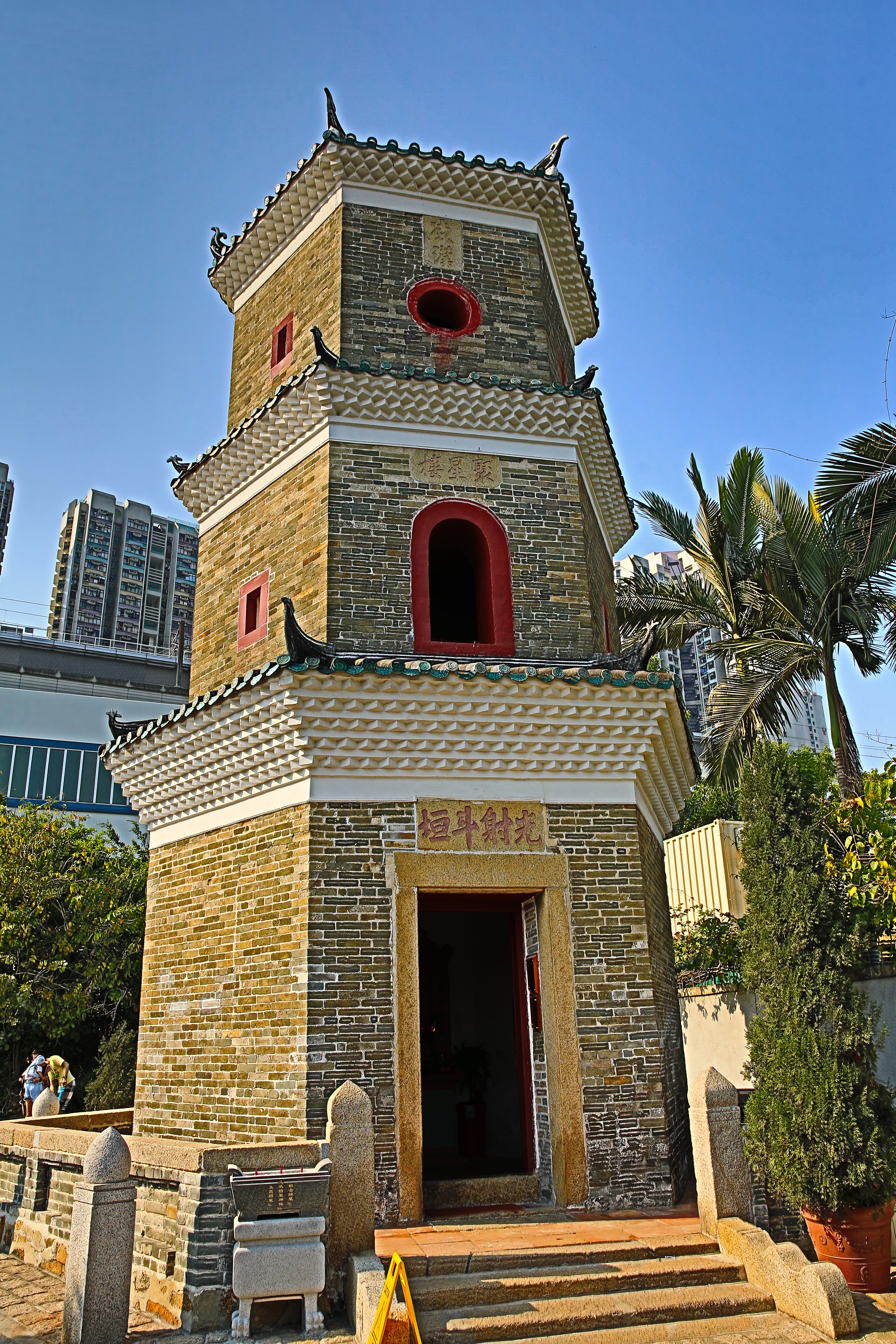
Tsui Sing Lau Pagoda of Tang Clan

Originated from Jishui of Jiangxi province, the Tangs were the first settled in the New Territories amongst the five clans, and were considered to be the first amongst all with the massive population and land. Tang Foo-hip migrated to now Kam Tin, Yuen Long in the early 11th century. Two out of the five major branches remained in Hong Kong (Ping Shan and Kam Tin) while the other three moved back to mainland China. Descendants of Tang of Kam Tin further spread to Ha Tsuen, Tsz Tin Tsuen, Lung Yeuk Tau, Sha Tau Kok, Tai Po Tau, and other places. Tangs also built ancestral and study halls, and markets near the villages, notably markets of Yuen Long and Tai Po, which were considered to have greatly contributed the development of New Territories.

== Man ==
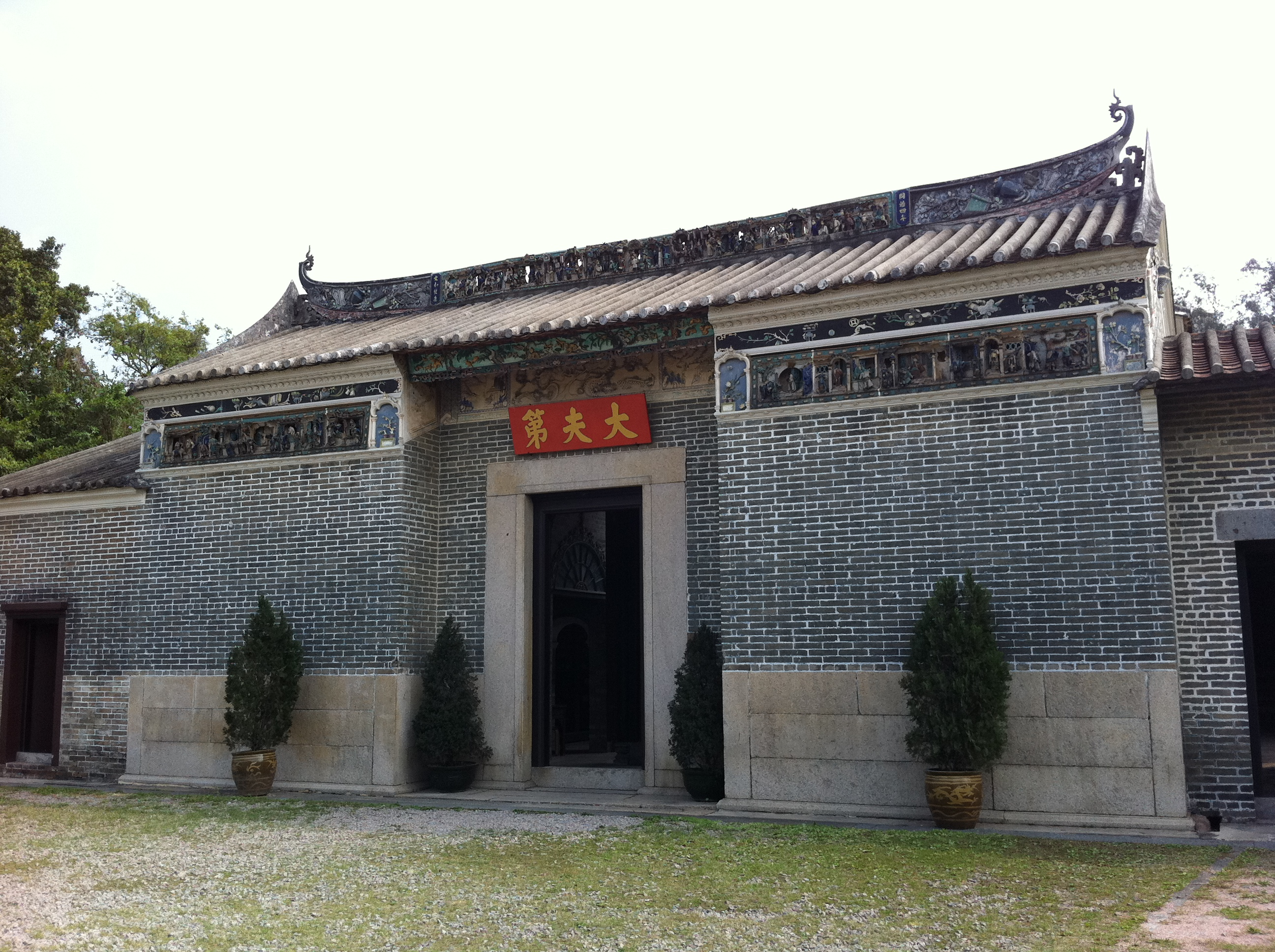
Tai Fu Tai Mansion of Man Clan

Man of San Tin had their ancestral root in Ji'an of Jiangxi. Man Tin-sui (文天瑞), the earliest traceable ancestor who is cousin of former Grand Chancellor Man Tin-cheung, fled to Dongguan during the late Southern Song dynasty. Man Sai-ko (文世歌), 7th general after Man Tin-sui, settled in San Tin during the era of Yongle Emperor's reign. At its peak, the Man Clan owned 40 million square feet of land in Lok Ma Chau.

== Liu ==
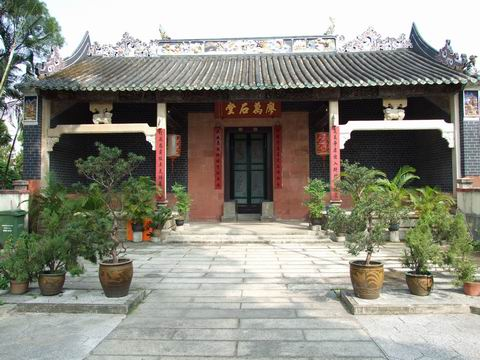
Liu Man Shek Tong Ancestral Hall of Liu Clan in Sheung Shui Wai

Ancestors of Liu Clan initially resided in Yongding of Fujian. During the Yuan dynasty, Liu Chung-kit (廖仲傑) moved to Tuen Mun and Futian until his eventual stay near Sheung Yue River. His son Liu Chi-yuk (廖自玉) founded the village of Sheung Shui Heung after the Kans left. According to myths, the Lius dressed up as ghosts to spook the Kans, forcing them to relocate to Tsung Pak Long. Nowadays Liu Clan would still thank the Khan during their rituals. Majority of the Liu Clan still lived in Sheung Shui Wai, whilst some branches moved to Cheung Muk Tau and Ngau Pei Sha.

The Liu Clan, during Qing's rule, established Shek Wu Hui, and brought tremendous fortune to the clan because of its proximity with Shenzhen market, overtaking the Hau Clan in the same region. The family owned land as far as So Kon Po on the Hong Kong Island.

== Hau ==
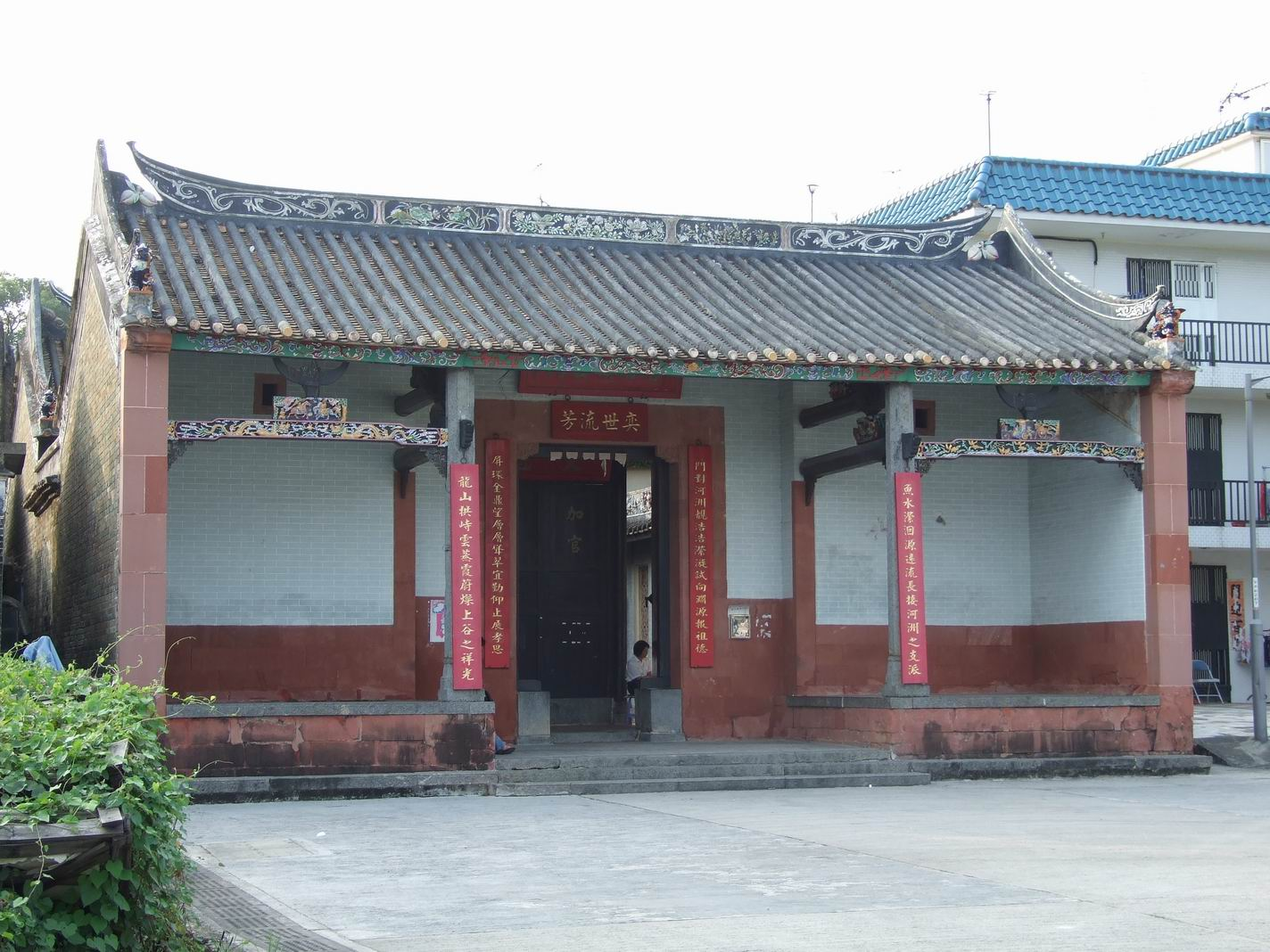
Hau Kun Shek Ancestral Hall of Hau Clan

The Hau Clan arrived in modern-day Hong Kong towards the end of the 12th century, during the Southern Song dynasty. They first settled at Ho Sheung Heung. They later settled three branch-villages: Yin Kong, Kam Tsin and Ping Kong.

Hau Clan of Sheung Shui originated from Panyu of Guangdong. Hau Cheuk-fung (侯卓峰) later moved to Ho Sheung Heung, with two sons relocating to Kam Tsin and other places. The then powerful clan formed two clans in Sheung Shui (near nowadays Hang Tau and Shek Wu Hui), but was eventually surpassed by the Liu Clan. Fanling Golf Course was built as a result of negotiation between the Hau Clan and the Hong Kong Government in 1908, which the former was compensated for the loss of ancestral land.

== Pang ==
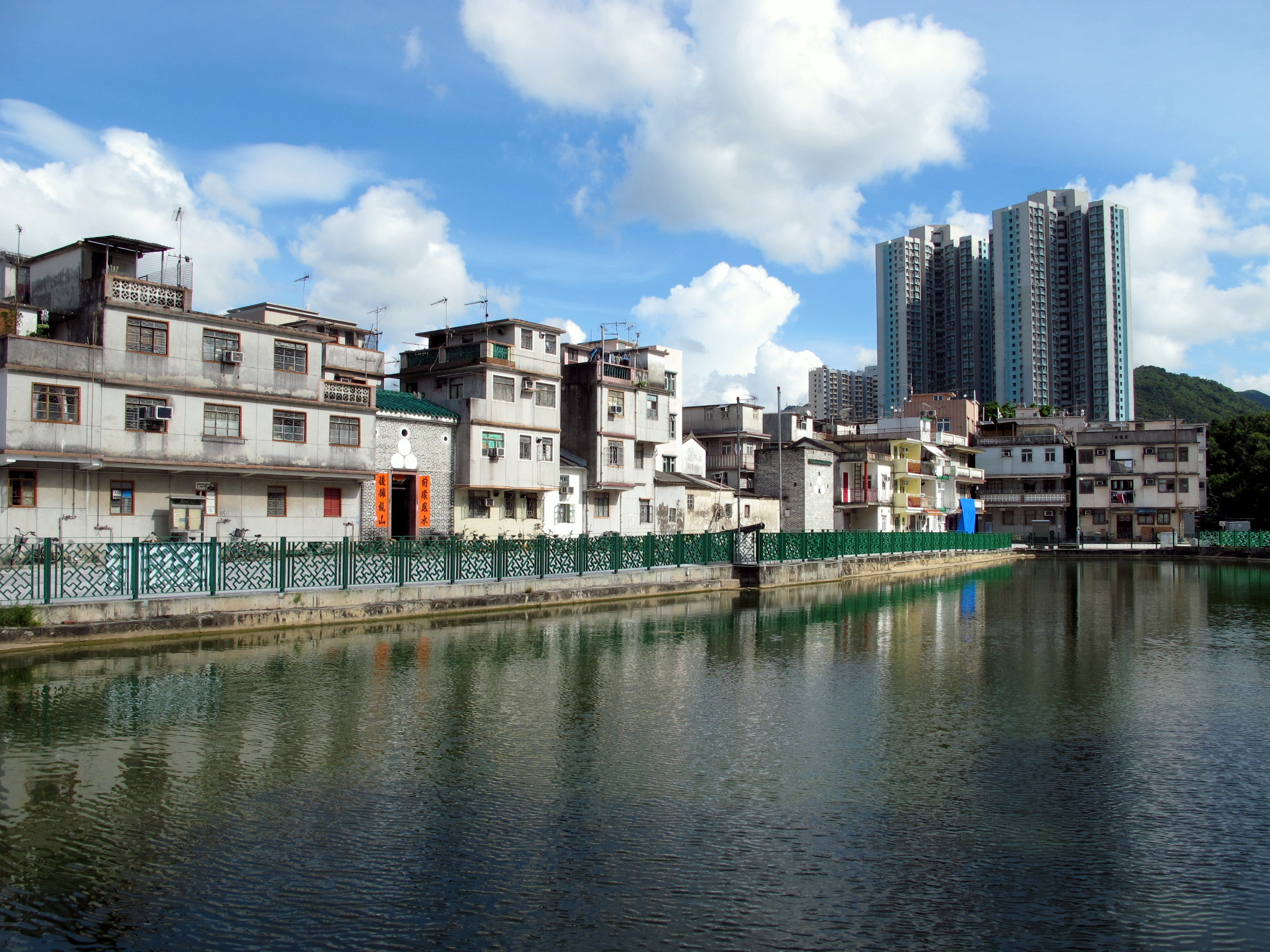
Fanling Wai of Pang Clan

Pang Clan rooted in Yichun, Jiangxi until Pang Kwai (彭桂) and his family relocated to Lung Yeuk Tau of Fanling. In the late Yuan dynasty Pangs were forced out by the migrating Tangs and lived in Fan Leng Lau instead. Offspring of Pang Clan also resided in Tsiu Keng, Ting Kok, So Kwun Po, and So Kon Po of Liu Clan's leased land. In the late 1940s, Pang formed Luen Wo Hui with other nearby villages to challenge Tang's Shek Wu Hui.

== See also ==
- Chinese kin
