= Punti =

Cantonese endonym used in Guangdong and Guangxi

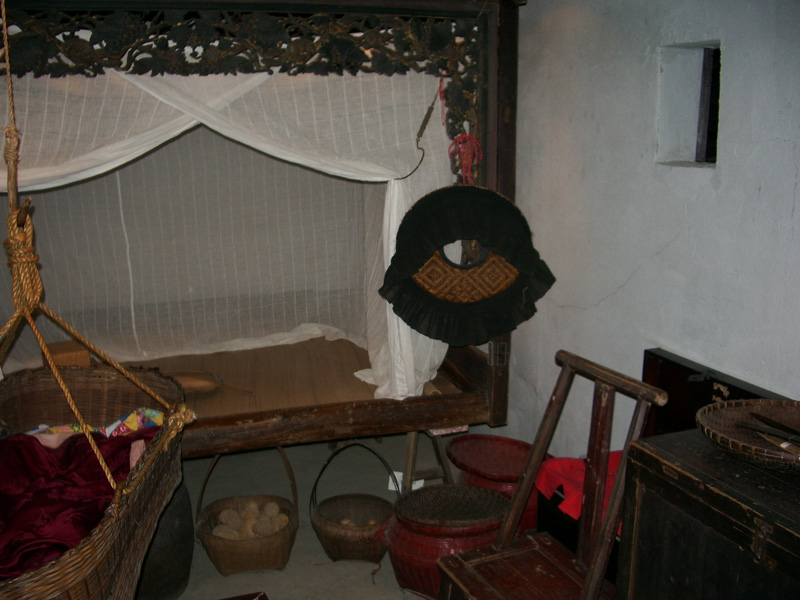
- "Punti Residence" exhibit at the Hong Kong Museum of History
- Chinese: 本地
- Literal meaning: local(s)
Transcriptions
Standard Mandarin
- Hanyu Pinyin: běndì
- Wade–Giles: pen^{3}-ti^{4}
Hakka
- Romanization: bun^{3} ti^{4}
Yue: Cantonese
- Yale Romanization: bún deih
- Jyutping: bun2 dei6
- IPA: Cantonese pronunciation: [pǔːn tèi]

Punti (Chinese: 本地; Jyutping: bun2 dei6; lit. 'locals') is a Cantonese endonym referring to the native Cantonese people of Guangdong and Guangxi.

In Hong Kong, Punti designates Weitou dialect-speaking locals in contrast to non-Weitou speakers such as Cantonese people, Taishanese people, Hoklo people, Hakka people, and ethnic minorities such as the Zhuang people of Guangxi and the boat-dwelling Tanka people, who are both descendants of the Baiyue – although the Tanka have largely assimilated into Han Chinese culture. Punti as a group refers in a strict sense to the Weitou-speaking indigenous inhabitants of Hong Kong who settled in Hong Kong before the New Territories of Hong Kong were leased to the British Empire in 1898. Prominently represented by the "Weitou people" (圍頭人) – the Hau (侯), Tang (鄧), Pang (彭), Liu (廖), and Man (文) – these indigenous Punti inhabitants were afforded additional privileges in land ownership enshrined in the Convention for the Extension of Hong Kong Territory and the Basic Law of Hong Kong.

When used to designate a language, "Punti" is equivalent to the Standard Cantonese mainly used in Guangzhou (formerly Canton), Hong Kong and Macau. "Punti" became a word often used in the legal system of Hong Kong and other official settings; when a defendant chooses to use Punti in court, he/she elects to use Cantonese as the language of the proceedings instead of English. Despite the reference to Punti, in this context the word means nothing more than "Cantonese Chinese" as a spoken language, particularly Hong Kong dialect; there are political and practical reasons for not using the term "Cantonese Chinese".

Modern use of the demonym Punti is promoted by the Hong Kong Museum of History, which maintains an extensive collection of Punti artefacts.

== See also ==
- Agriculture in Hong Kong
- Agriculture in Macau
- Cantonese people
- Hoklo people
- Punti-Hakka Clan Wars
- Tanka people
- Small House Policy
- Weitou dialect
