= Ho Sheung Heung =

Area in Sheung Shui, North District, Hong Kong

Coordinates: 22.51079°N 114.10853°E

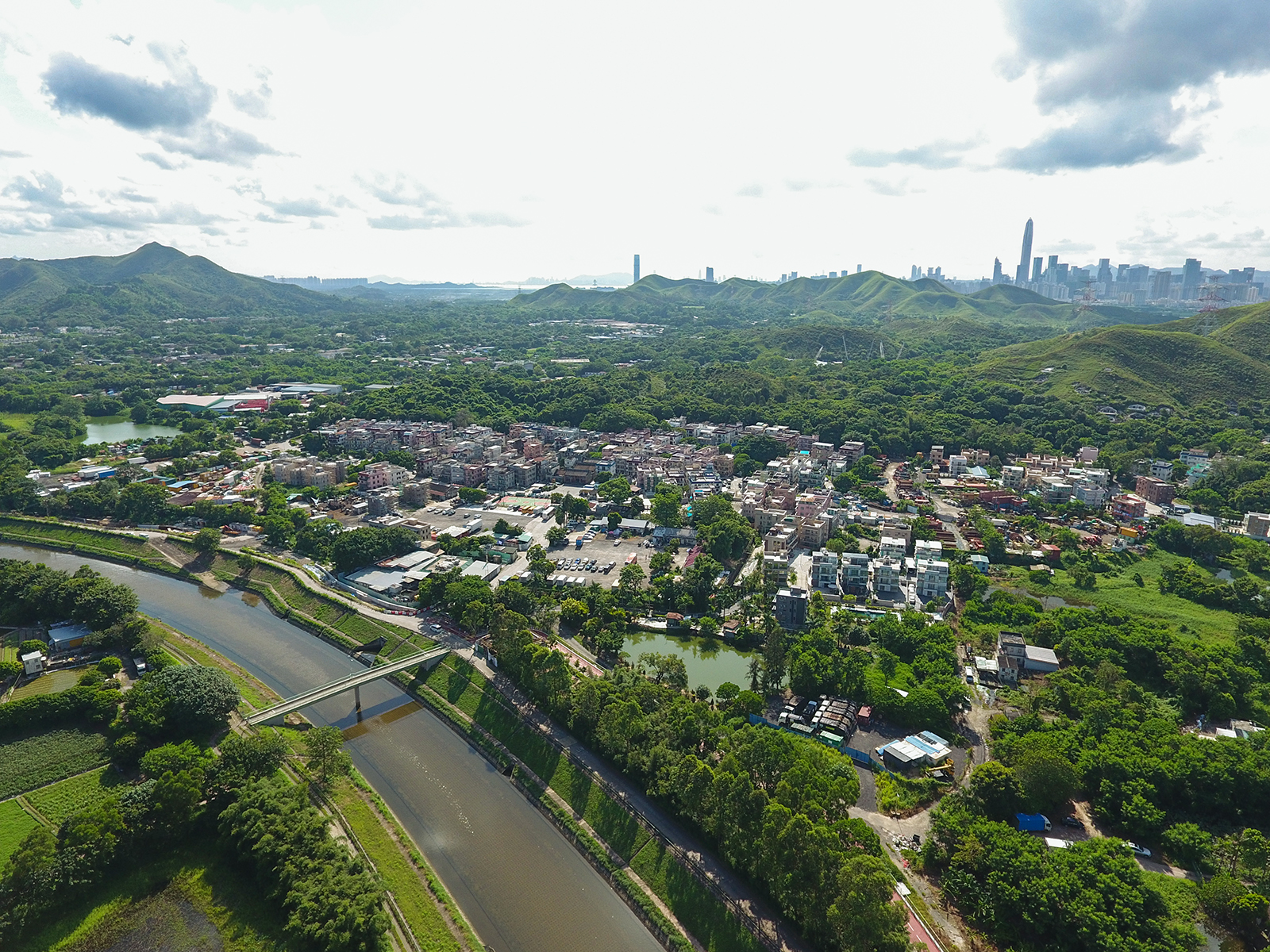
Aerial view of Ho Sheung Heung. The skyline of Shenzhen is visible in the background.

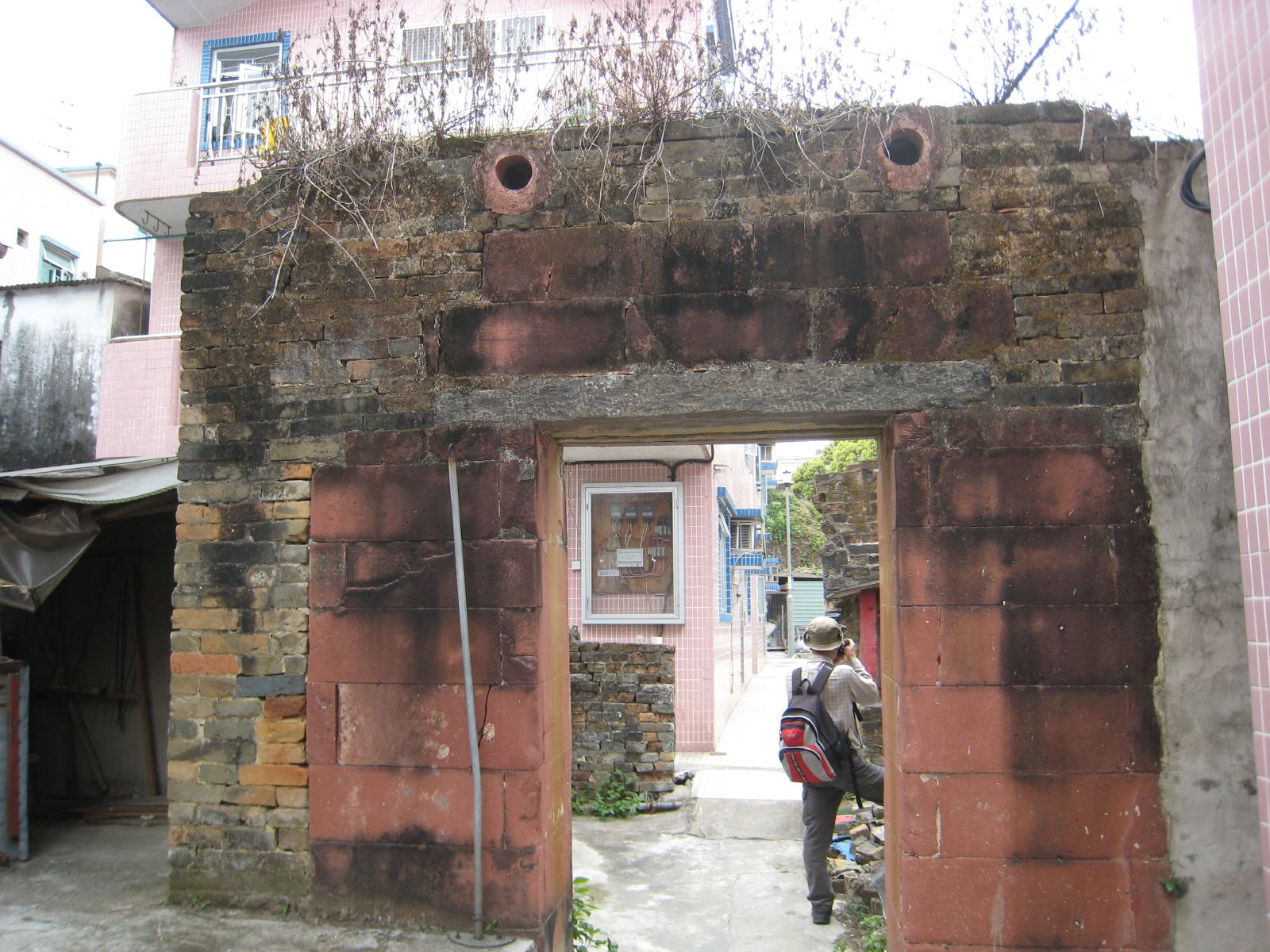
Entrance gate of Ho Sheung Heung Lo Wai.

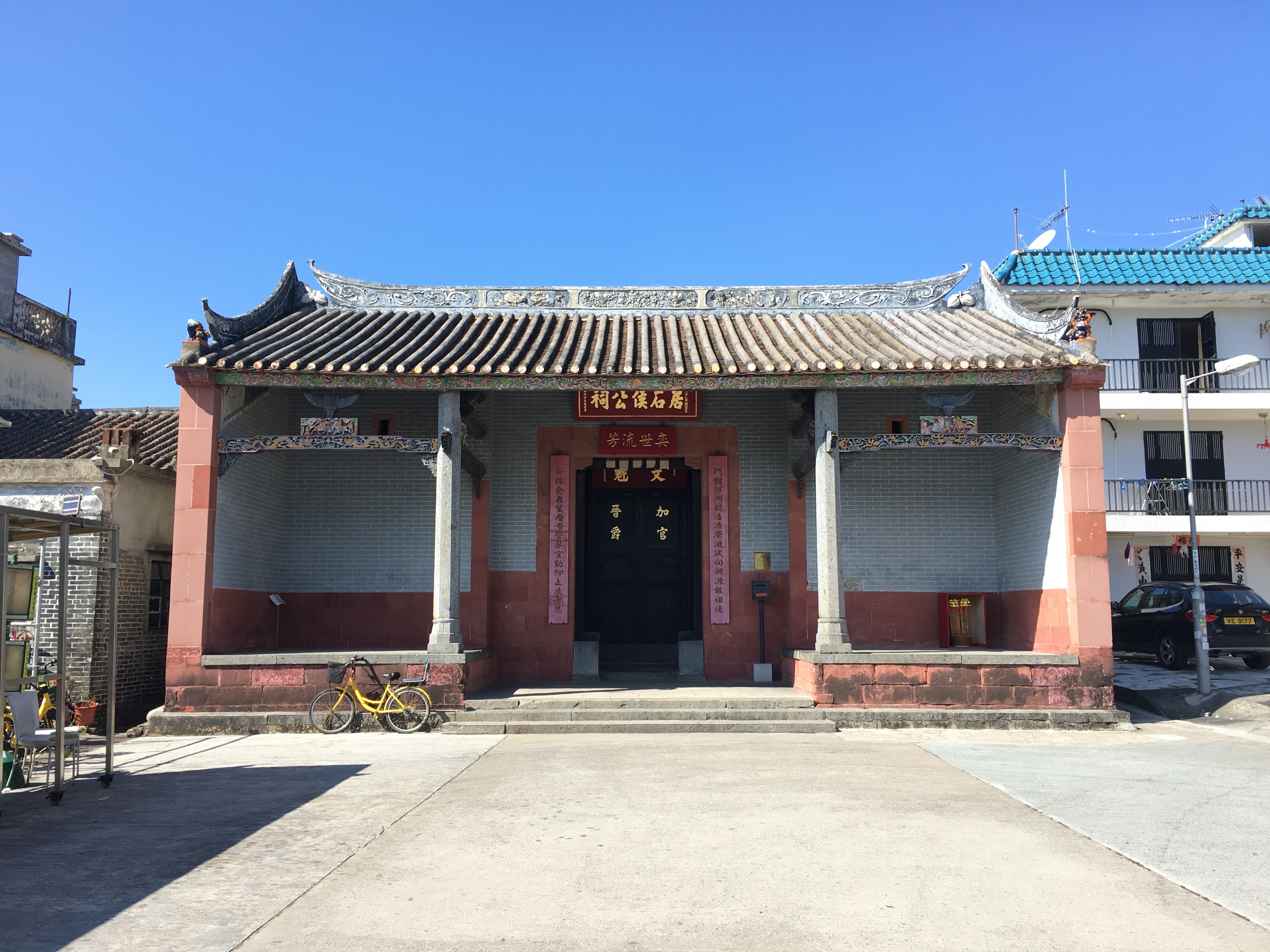
Hau Ku Shek Ancestral Hall.

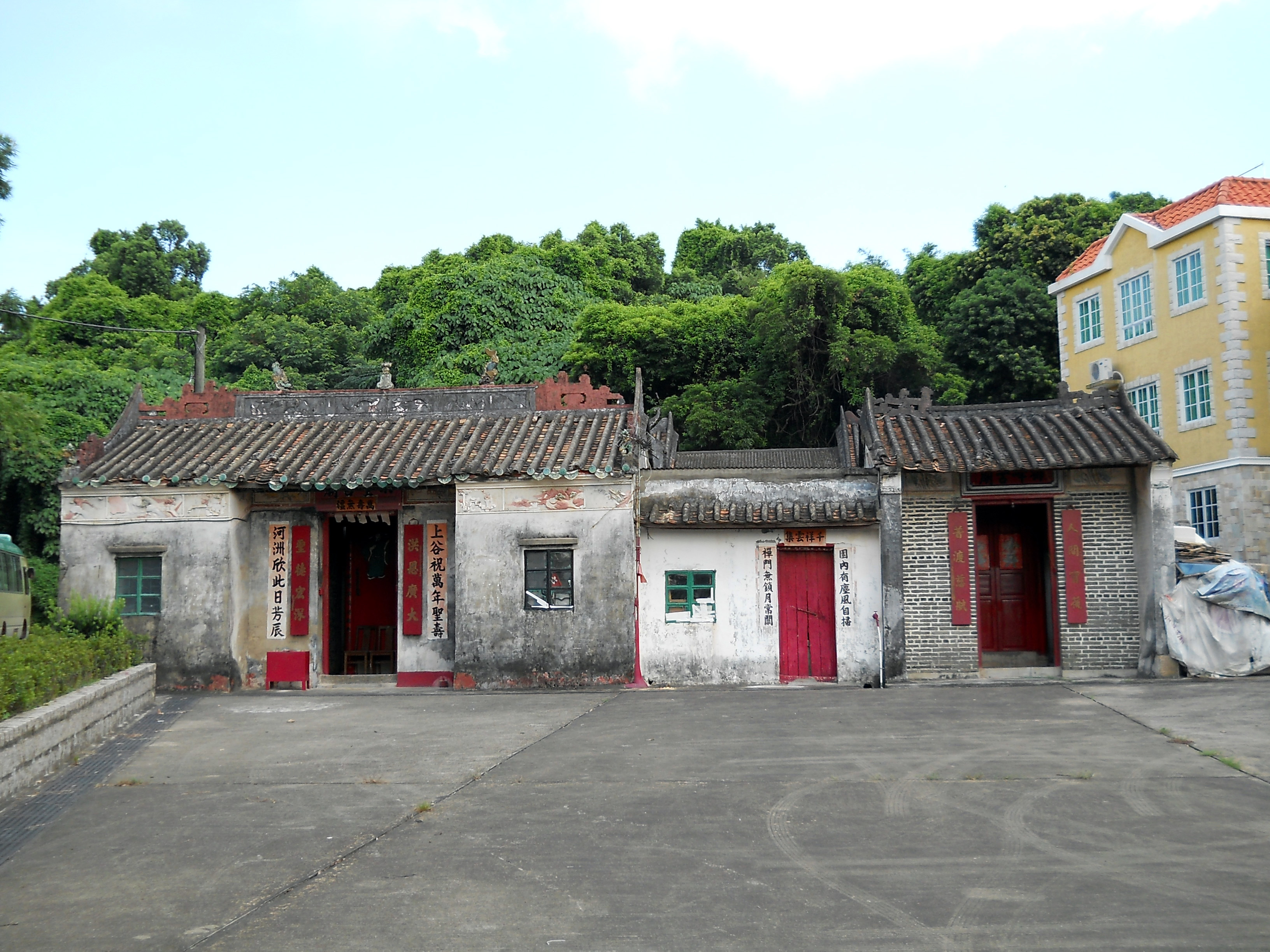
Hung Shing Temple and Pai Fung Temple.

Ho Sheung Heung (Chinese: 河上鄉) is an area in Sheung Shui, North District, Hong Kong.

== Administration ==
Ho Sheung Heung is a recognized village under the New Territories Small House Policy. For electoral purposes, Ho Sheung Heung is part of the Sheung Shui Rural constituency of the North District Council. It is currently represented by Simon Hau Fuk-tat, who was elected in the local elections.

== History ==
The Hau (侯) Clan, one of the Five Great Clans of the New Territories, arrived in modern-day Hong Kong towards the end of the 12th century, during the Southern Song dynasty. They first settled at Ho Sheung Heung. They later settled three branch-villages: Yin Kong, Kam Tsin and Ping Kong.

== Villages ==
There are four villages in Ho Sheung Heung, namely Nam Pin Wai, Pak Pin Wai, Chung Sum Tsuen and Chung Wai Tsuen (San Tsuen).

Ho Sheung Heung Lo Wai (河上鄉老圍) a.k.a. Pak Pin Wai (北邊圍) is a walled village.

== Conservation ==
Hau Ku Shek Ancestral Hall in Ho Sheung Heung has been listed as a declared monument since 2003. The Sin Wai Nunnery and the Hung Shing Temple and Pai Fung Temple are listed as Grade III historic buildings since 2010.
