= Yin Kong =

Coordinates: 22.504266°N 114.111582°E

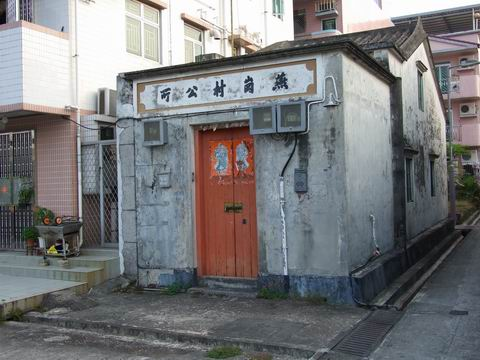
Yin Kong rural committee office.

Yin Kong (Chinese: 燕崗) is a village in Sheung Shui, North District, Hong Kong.

== Administration ==
Yin Kong is a recognized village under the New Territories Small House Policy. It is one of the villages represented within the Sheung Shui District Rural Committee. For electoral purposes, Yin Kong is part of the Sheung Shui Rural constituency, which is currently represented by Simon Hau Fuk-tat.

== History ==
The Hau (侯) Clan, one of the Five Great Clans of the New Territories, arrived in modern-day Hong Kong towards the end of the 12th century, during the Southern Song dynasty. They first settled at Ho Sheung Heung. They later settled three branch-villages: Yin Kong, Kam Tsin and Ping Kong.

At the time of the 1911 census, the population of Yin Kong was 35. The number of males was 21.
