= Ping Kong =

Walled village in Hong Kong

Coordinates: 22.490513°N 114.122497°E

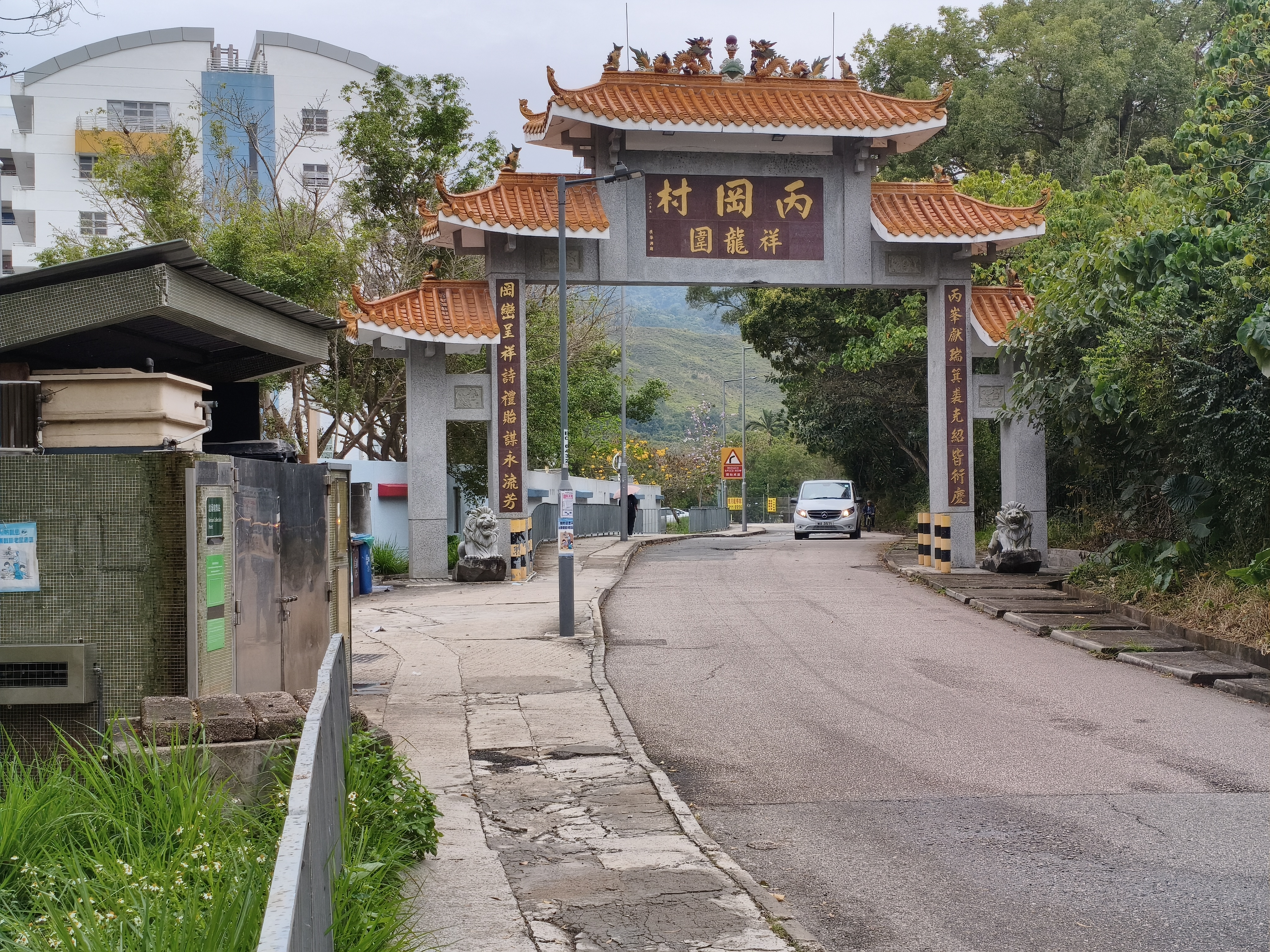
Paifang of Ping Kong

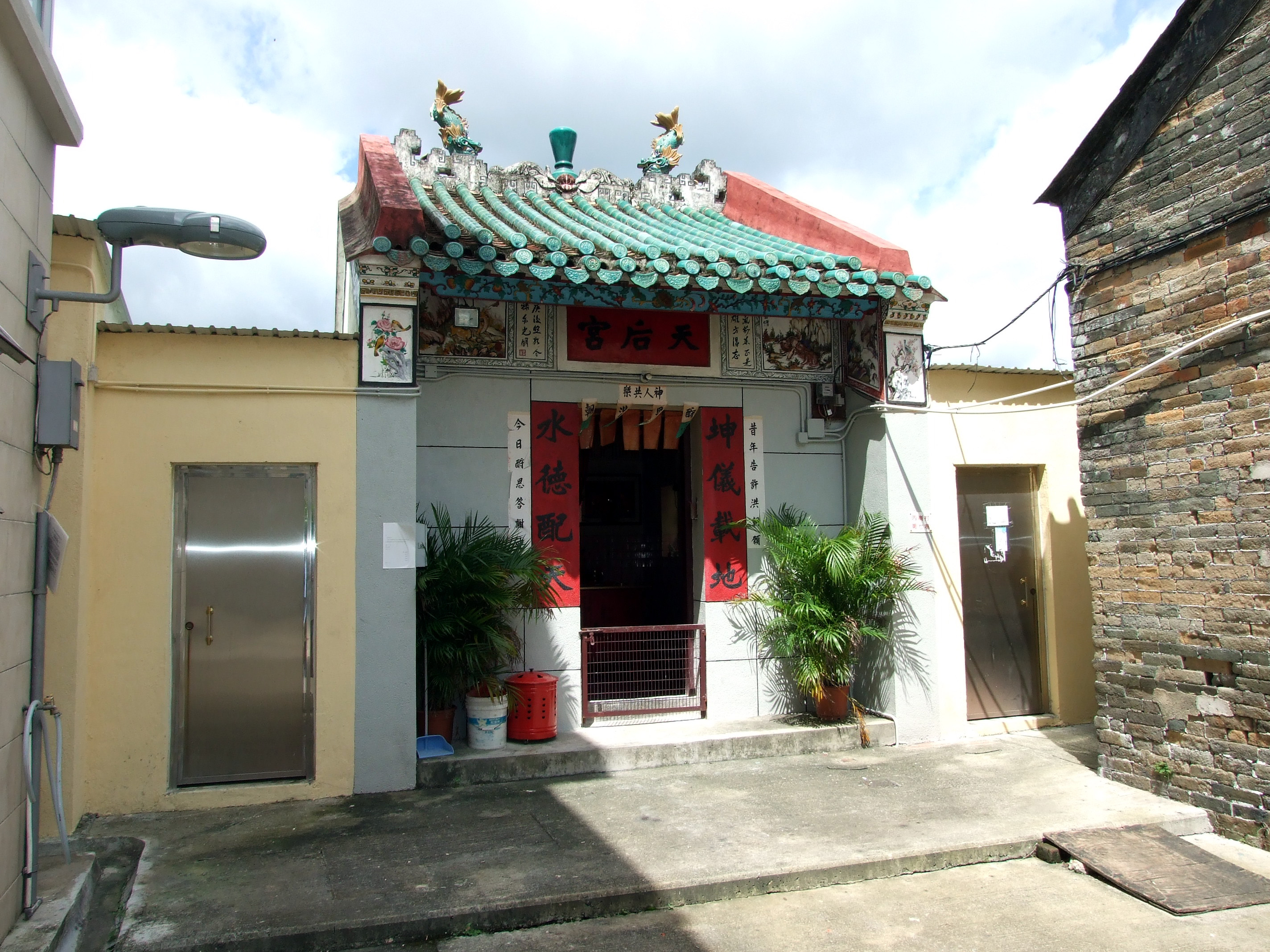
Tin Hau Temple in Ping Kong.

Ping Kong (Chinese: 丙岡) is a walled village in Sheung Shui, North District, Hong Kong.

== Administration ==
Ping Kong is a recognized village under the New Territories Small House Policy. It is one of the villages represented within the Sheung Shui District Rural Committee. For electoral purposes, Ping Kong is part of the Yu Tai constituency, which was formerly represented by Vincent Chan Chi-fung until July 2021.

== History ==
The Hau (侯) Clan, one of the Five Great Clans of the New Territories, arrived in modern-day Hong Kong towards the end of the 12th century, during the Southern Song dynasty. They first settled at Ho Sheung Heung. They later settled three branch-villages: Yin Kong, Kam Tsin and Ping Kong. In 1851, a war opposed the village of San Tin to Ping Kong and Kam Tsin. Ping Kong was described in the early 20th century as a 'very wealthy Punti village'.

In the old days, the walled village was named 'Cheung Lung Wai' (祥龍圍), which translated as the 'Lucky Dragon Wall'.

== Features ==
Ping Kong has a Tin Hau Temple, which was featured in Jackie Chan's 1983 film Project A. The Hau ancestral hall was rebuilt inside the village wall after the old one outside was burned down during a fight with the Man (文).

== Festival ==
Ping Kong is also one of the few villages in Hong Kong that continue to host the traditional Taiping Qingjiao festival once every decade, with the latest in 2018. The Taoist festival is a 3-day celebration to thanks the Heavens for a peaceful decade and wish for prosperity in the future. Representatives for the ceremony are chosen among the Hau family members by tossing the "Holy Cups". Going through the genealogy book, the first 5 males who toss both cups up-side are chosen as the representative to lead the ceremony for the village. Even though a lot of the Hau family members immigrated oversea to Europe and the Americas, many of them return for this special event to gather. The ceremony involves a lot of interesting activities to "worship" the gods, includes freeing animals, inviting wandering ghosts to the village for resurrection, running a "horse" around the village to collect everyone's name to send to the Heavens, carrying the "ghost king" around the village to catch evil spirits and burn them at the end of the ceremony. The "monks" who guide the representatives to lead the ceremony also perform many traditional rituals. Several highlights are dressing up / fixing appearance before "seeing" the gods, performing an Act that the Heavens received the village's genealogy book and offer their blessing, there are also several kungfu-like performances that usually draw a big crowd. During the festival, Hau family members gather at the Ancestor hall for lunch and dinner. The food being served are traditional vegetarian poon choi during the festival. After the conclusion of the ceremony, the poon choi will switch to the classic style with meat and seafood. Each household within the clan will also receive a cut of grill pork.

== See also ==
- Walled villages of Hong Kong
- Cheung Lung Wai Estate, a nearby public housing estate
