= Economy of Macau =

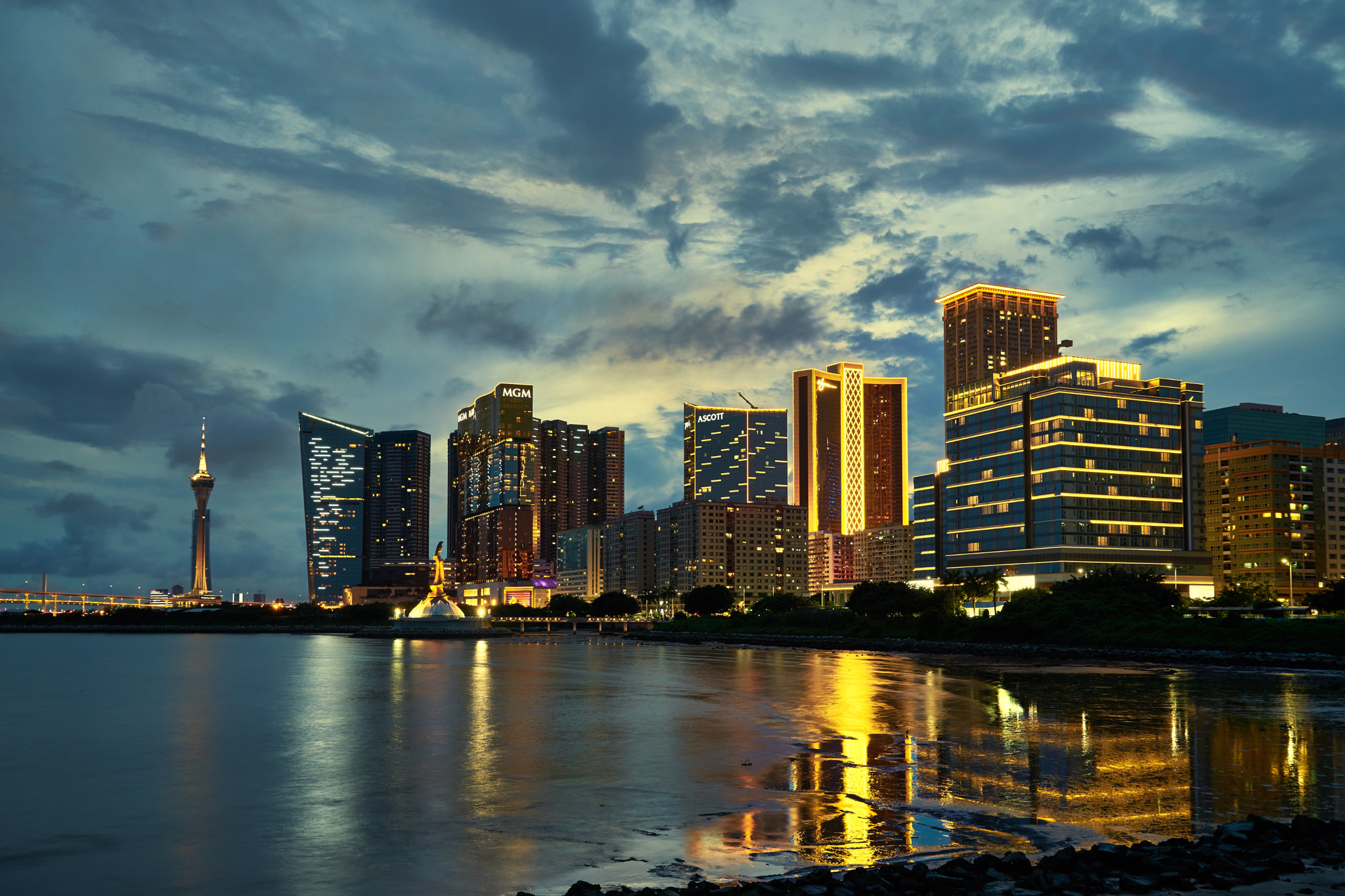
- Currency: Macanese pataca (MOP); Hong Kong dollar (HKD, unofficial)
- Fiscal year: Calendar year
- Trade organisations: WTO, One Belt One Road, Boao Forum, Forum Macao, ICC
- Country group: Advanced economy; High-income economy

Statistics
- Population: ▲644,426 (2024)
- GDP: ▲$51.52 billion (nominal, 2025); ▲$93.71 billion (PPP, 2025)
- GDP rank: 93rd (nominal; 2025); 101st (PPP; 2025)
- GDP growth: 4.7% (2025); 8.8% (2024); 75.06% (2023); -19.61% (2022); 23.54% (2021)
- GDP per capita: ▲$76,314 (nominal, 2025); ▲$134,042 (PPP, 2025)
- GDP per capita rank: 8th (nominal; 2025); 3rd (PPP; 2025)
- GDP by sector: Agriculture: 0% (2016 est.); Industry: 6.3%; Services: 93.7%; (2017 est.)
- Inflation (CPI): 0.7% (2024)
- Population below national poverty line: NA
- Gini coefficient: 35 medium (2013)
- Human Development Index: ▲0.925 very high (2022) (Note: The UN does not calculate the HDI of Macau. The government of Macau calculates its own HDI.) (24th)
- Labour force: ▲388,620 (2019); ▼70.9% employment rate (2016)
- Labour force by occupation: Agriculture: 2.5%; Industry: 9.8%; Services: 4.4%; Industry and services: 12.4%; Agriculture/fishing/forestry/mining: 15%; Manufacturing: 25.9%; Construction: 7.1%; Transportation and utilities: 2.6%; Commerce: 20.3%; (2013 est.)
- Unemployment: 1.7% (Q2, 2019)
- Main industries: Tourism, gambling, clothing, textiles, electronics, footwear, toys

External
- Exports: $1.45 billion (2018 est.)
- Export goods: Clothing, textiles, footwear, toys, electronics, machinery and parts
- Main export partners: Hong Kong:64.9%; China:10.33%; ASEAN::::::.10.33%; United States:10.17%; Switzerland:1.3%; Japan:1.03% (2022)
- Imports: $11.55 billion (2016 est.)
- Import goods: Raw materials and semi-manufactured goods, consumer goods (foodstuffs, beverages, tobacco, garments and footwear, motor vehicles), capital goods, mineral fuels and oils
- Main import partners: China:39%; Hong Kong:25.3%; ASEAN::::::.10.33%; United States:10.31%; United Kingdom:2.98%; Japan:3.06% (2022)
- FDI stock: ▲$18.91 billion (31 December 2011 est.); ▲ Abroad: $1.166 billion (2012 est.)
- Current account: ▲$14.38 billion (2023)
- Gross external debt: $0 (31 December 2013)

Public finance
- Government debt: 0% of GDP (2017 est.)
- Foreign reserves: ▲$29.392 billion (2024) (Note: the Fiscal Reserves Act that came into force on 1 January 2012 requires the fiscal reserves to be separated from the foreign exchange reserves and to be managed separately; the transfer of assets took place in February 2012)
- Budget balance: +10% (of GDP) (2017 est.)
- Revenue: $11.756 billion (2023)
- Spending: $10.787 billion (2023)
- All values, unless otherwise stated, are in US dollars.

Macau has a highly developed market economy, which has remained one of the most open in the world since its handover to China in 1999. Apparel exports and gambling-related tourism are mainstays of the economy. Since Macau has little arable land and few natural resources, it depends on mainland China for most of its food, fresh water, and energy imports. Japan and Hong Kong are the main suppliers of raw materials and capital goods. Although Macau was hit hard by the 1997–98 Asian financial crisis and the early 2000s recession, its economy grew approximately 13.1% annually on average between 2001 and 2006. During the first three-quarters of 2007, Macau registered year-on-year GDP increases of 31.4%. A rapid rise in the number of mainland visitors due to China's easing of travel restrictions, increased public works expenditures, and significant investment inflows associated with the liberalisation of Macau's gaming industry drove the five-year recovery. The budget also returned to surplus after 2002 because of the surge in visitors from China and a hike in taxes on gambling profits, which generated about 70% of government revenue.

Macau is a full Member of the World Trade Organization. Public security has greatly improved after handover to the People's Republic of China. With the tax revenue from the profitable gambling industry, the Macau government is able to introduce the social welfare program of 15 years of free education to all Macau citizens. In 2015, Macau's economy saw a sharp decrease (-26.4% year-on-year in Q2 2015) due to the reduced spending by visitors from mainland China since the Anti-corruption campaign under Xi Jinping. The Hong Kong dollar is itself a reserve currency for the Macanese pataca, which is pegged at the official rate of around 1 Hong Kong dollar to 1.03 Macanese pataca.

== History ==
Macau was a barren fishing village with a population of about 400 before the Portuguese arrived in the 16th century, during the Age of Discovery. In 1535, the Portuguese traders obtained by bribing the right to anchor ships in Macau harbours and engage in trading activities. Portuguese and Chinese merchants flocked to Macau, and it quickly became an important regional trading center in Portugal's lucrative trade along three major routes: Macau-Malacca-Goa-Lisbon, Guangzhou-Macau-Nagasaki and Macau-Manila-Mexico. However, with the decline of Portugal as a world power in the 17th and 18th centuries, the trading routes were challenged by other powers such as the Dutch and the British. After China ceded Hong Kong to the British in 1842, Macau's position as a major regional trading center declined further still because larger ships were drawn to the deep water port of Victoria Harbour. In an attempt to reverse the decline, from 1848 to the early 1870s Macau engaged in the infamous trade of coolies (slave labourers) as a transit port, shipping locals from southern China to Cuba, Peru, and other South American ports to work on plantations or in mines.

Fishing re-emerged as a dominant economic activity in Macau as it lost its position as a regional trading center. In the early 1920s, over 70% of Macau's 84,000 residents were engaged in fishing. Meanwhile, some other businesses started to develop, such as matches, firecrackers, incense and fishing-boat building. But the most notable was the gambling business. Gambling was first legalised in the 19th century in an attempt to generate revenues for the government. The first casino monopoly concession was granted to the Tai Xing Company in 1937. The company was, however, too conservative to fully exploit the economic potential of gambling. The industry saw a major breakthrough in 1962 when the government granted the Sociedade de Turismo e Diversoes de Macau (STDM), a syndicate jointly formed by Hong Kong and Macau businessmen, the monopoly rights to all forms of gambling. The STDM introduced western-style games and modernised the marine transport between Macau and Hong Kong, bringing millions of gamblers from Hong Kong every year.

In the 1970s Macau also saw a rapid development in its manufacturing sector. With Macau's low-cost operating environment and its surplus quotas under the Multi Fiber Arrangement (MFA), many Hong Kong industrialists established textile and garment manufacturing bases in Macau. At its golden age in the 1980s, the manufacturing sector accounted for about 40% of Macau's GDP; textiles and garments accounted for about 90% of Macau's total visible exports. However, the manufacturing sector has experienced a gradual decline since the early 1990s due to phasing out of the MFA quota system and the rising labour costs relative to mainland China and Southeast Asian countries.

== Sectors ==
=== Tourism and gambling ===
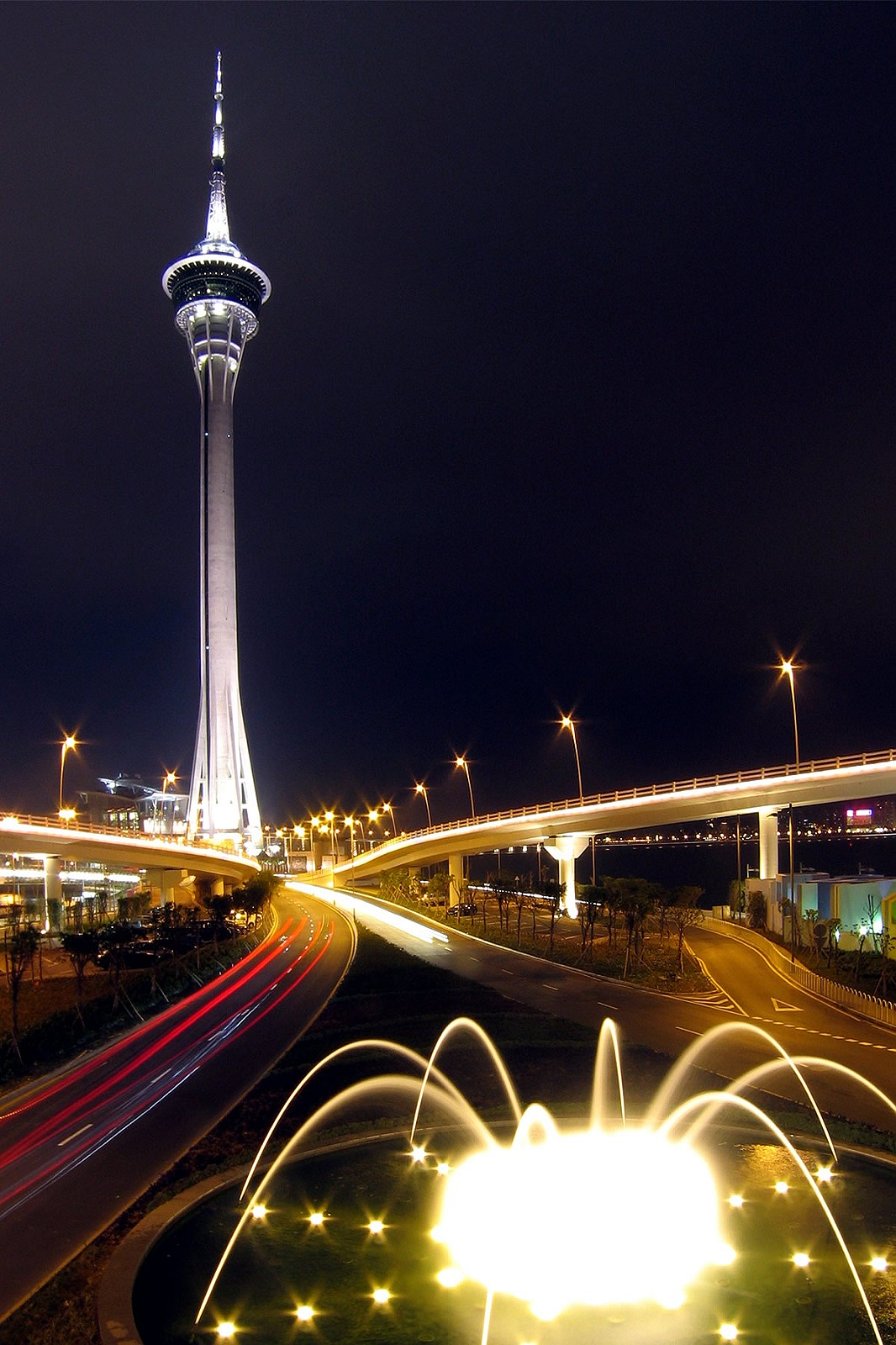
Macau Tower at night.

Visitor arrivals by place of residence in 2006
Place of residence	No. of visitor arrivals (in thousands)
Mainland China	11,985.6
Hong Kong	6,940.7
Taiwan (ROC)	1,437.8
Southeast Asia	693.4
Total	21,998.1

Tourism is the backbone of Macau's economy, and much of it geared towards gambling, which was legalised in the 19th century and has since been the linchpin of the economy and an important source of revenue for the government. As of at least 2015, 90% of tourist revenues in Macau are derived from gambling. For the Macau government, taxes derived from the table game of baccarat are the largest single source of public funds.

From 1962, the gambling industry operated under a government-issued monopoly licence by Stanley Ho's Sociedade de Turismo e Diversões de Macau (STDM), which replaced the Tai Heng Entertainment Corporation that had held a gaming monopoly for the previous 24 years. The monopoly ended in 2001 when the gaming industry was liberalised and several casino operators from Las Vegas entered the market. These new operators include Las Vegas Sands, which opened Sands Macao, the largest casino in the world as measured by total number of table games, in 2004 and Venetian Macau in 2007; Wynn Resorts, which opened Wynn Macau in 2006; and MGM Mirage, which opened MGM Grand Macau in 2007.

In addition, other casino owners, including Australian Crown Casino and Hong Kong Galaxy Entertainment Group have also opened several hotel casinos in Macau. As a result of the surge in number of casinos and construction from other new casino entrants, Macau's economy has grown rapidly, and gambling revenues from Macau's casinos are now greater than those of Las Vegas Strip, making Macau the highest-volume gambling center in the world. Numerous other hotel casinos, including Galaxy Cotai Megaresort and Ponte 16, are also to be opened in near future.

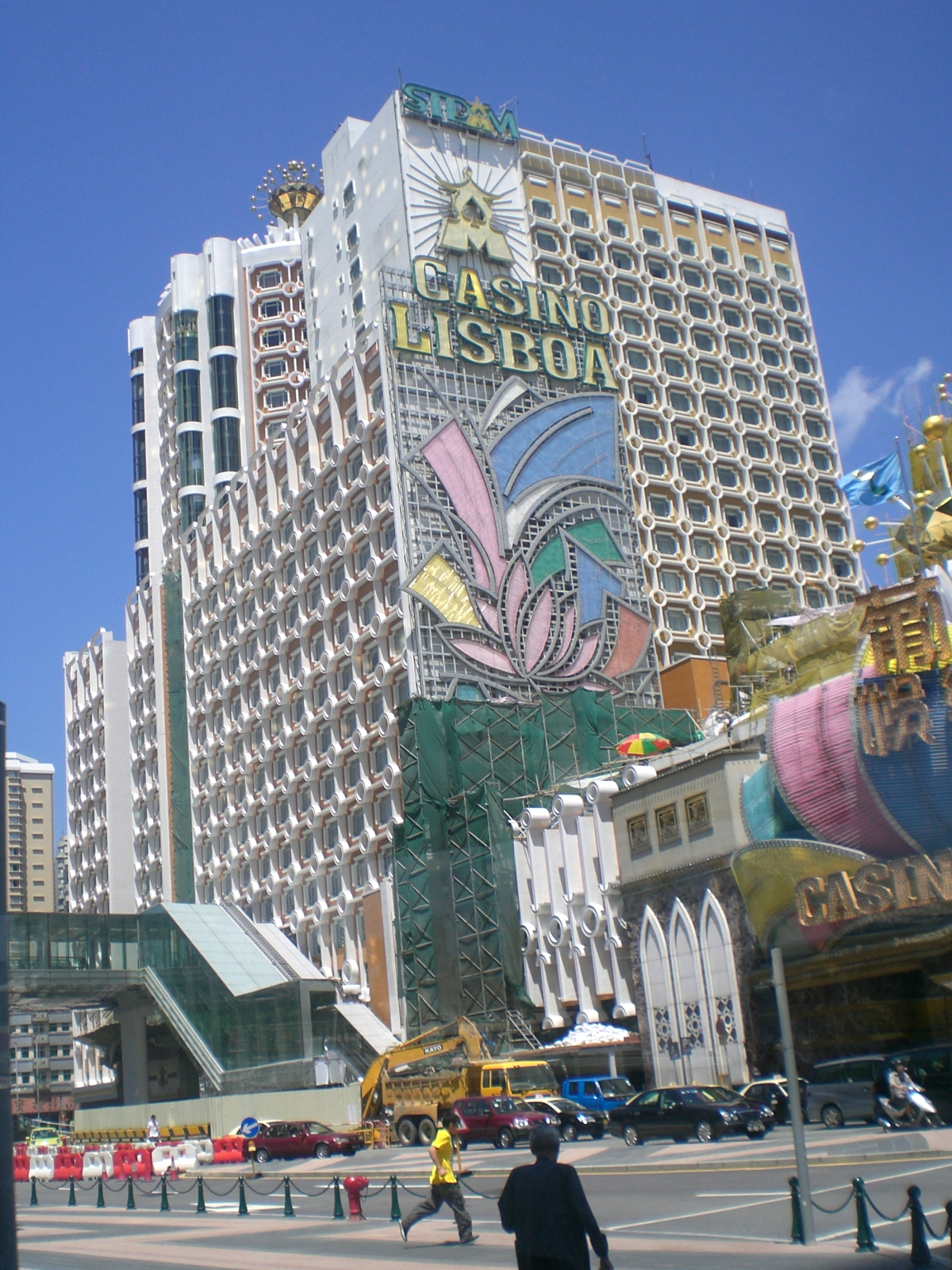
Casino Lisboa

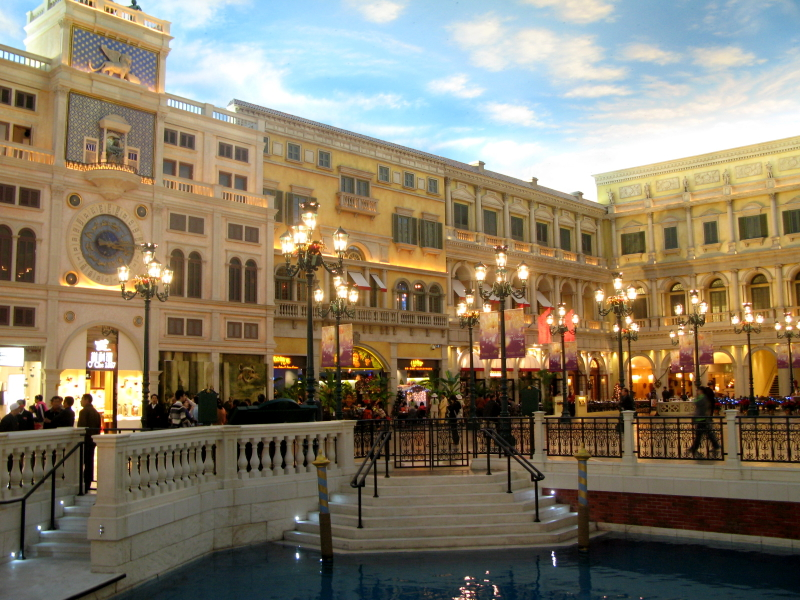
The interior of The Venetian Macao

Due to the opening of the new hotel casinos and China's easing of travel restrictions, there has been a rapid rise in the number of mainland visitors. From 9.1 million visitors in 2000, arrivals to Macau has grown to 18.7 million visitors in 2005 and 22 million visitors in 2006, with over 50% of the arrivals coming from mainland China and another 30% from Hong Kong. Macau is expected to receive between 24 and 25 million visitors in 2007. Macau also received the Future Award 2007, voted by 26,000 German travel trade members of GoAsia, for being regarded as the most promising future tourism destination in Asia. Macau is currently rated as one of the world's top tourism destinations by the World Tourism Organization.

Because Macau benefits from favorable taxation rules, it is a favored location for tourists from elsewhere in China to purchase luxury goods like cosmetics, jewelry, and designer fashion goods.

=== Manufacturing ===
Macau's manufacturing industries emerged in the first few decades of the 20th century, which mainly consisted of junk building, factories for matches, firecrackers and incense. Modern industries, however, did not take off until the 1970s when the textiles and garments industry was rising rapidly, while other light industries such as plastics, electronics, toys, and artificial flowers also experienced respectable growth. Textiles and garments further increased its dominance in the manufacturing sector towards the end of the 1980s.

Much of Macau's textile industry has moved to the mainland as the Multi-Fiber Agreement is phased out. The territory has relied more on gambling and tourism-related services to generate growth.

=== Banking ===
Macau is an offshore financial centre, a tax haven, and a free port with no foreign exchange control regimes. The offshore finance business is regulated and supervised by the Monetary Authority of Macao, while the regulation and supervision of the offshore non-finance business is mainly controlled by the Macau Trade and Investment Promotion Institute. In 2007, Moody's Investors Service upgraded Macau's foreign and local currency government issuer ratings to 'Aa3' from 'A1', citing its government's solid finances as a large net creditor. The rating agency also upgraded Macau's foreign currency bank deposit ceiling to 'Aa3' from 'A1'.

There are twenty other licensed banks, sixteen of which are foreign. Macau has five of the top 500 commercial banks in Asia, including Banco Tai Fung and Industrial and Commercial Bank of China.

=== Construction ===
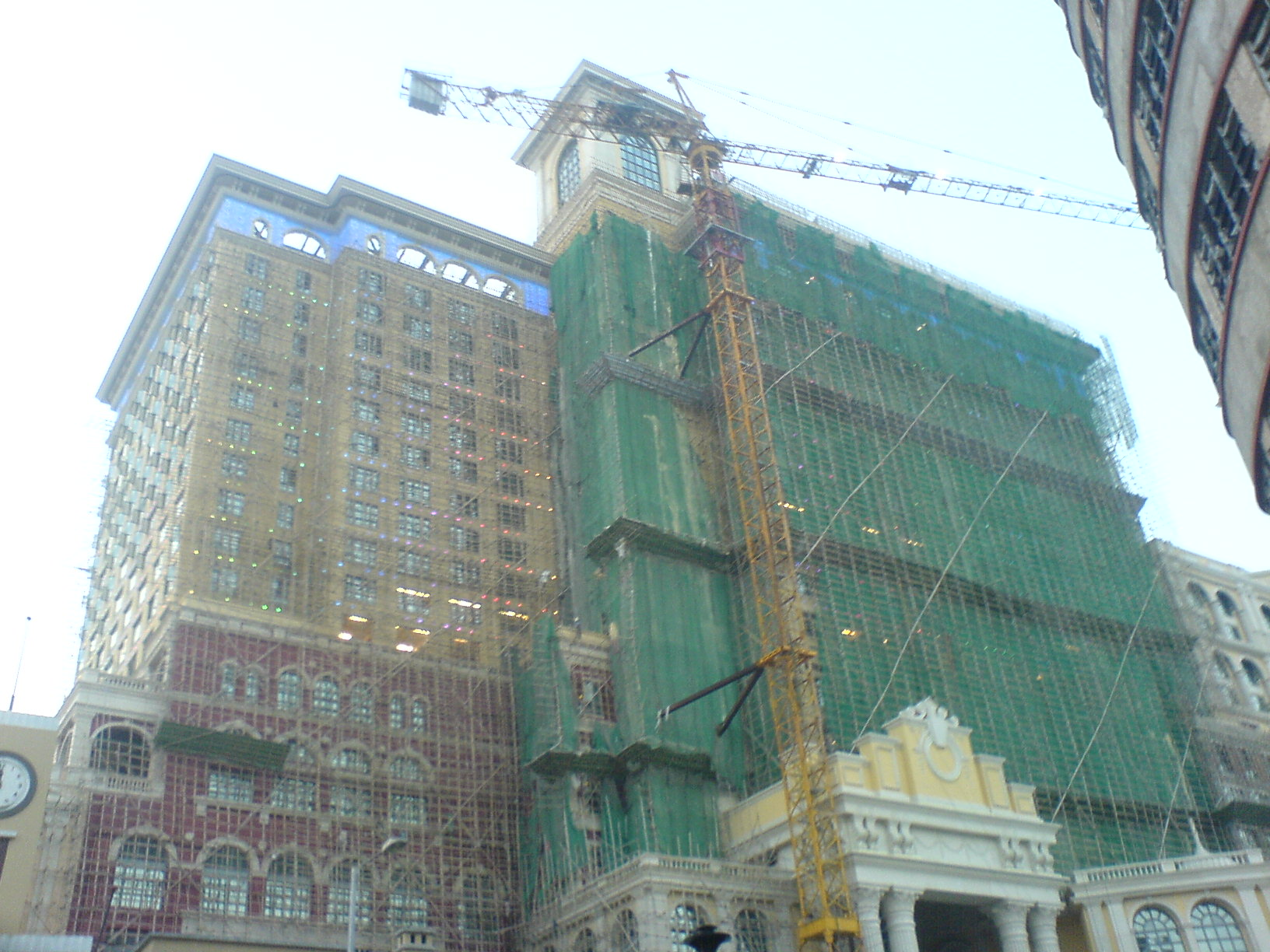
Ponte 16 under construction

In 2014, the construction sectors in Macau engaged 45,368 people. The value of construction was MOP78.15 billion, in which MOP66.88 billion belong to the private sectors. The intermediate consumption was MOP61.03 billion and labor cost was MOP11.35 billion.

=== Transport ===
Air Macau is Macau's Flag carrier and is based out of Macau International Airport.

=== Telecommunications and media ===
Macau has reportedly the highest "media density" in the world - nine Chinese-language dailies, three Portuguese-language dailies, two English-language dailies and about half a dozen Chinese-language weeklies and one Portuguese-language weekly. About two dozen newspapers from Hong Kong, mainland China, Taiwan and the Philippines are shipped to Macau every early morning.

== Economic diversification ==
Heavy reliance on the gambling and tourism sectors has long constituted a structural risk for Macau's economy, as any decline in visitor arrivals leads to significant economic volatility. Diversification efforts began during the final years of the Portuguese administration under Governor-General Vasco Rocha Vieira and continued after the handover under Chief Executive Edmund Ho. Although the government sought foreign investment as a catalyst for diversification, the majority of capital inflows followed the 2001 liberalization toward the gaming sector, with the exception of foreign entry into the telecommunications and internet service markets.

Macau is currently classified as a mono-industrial economy, with the gaming industry accounting for approximately 70% of government revenue and 50% of the GDP. The COVID-19 pandemic underscored this systemic vulnerability, as the territory recorded a record GDP contraction of 55.3% in 2020 following the collapse of tourism.

To address these challenges, the Chinese government is adopting the "1+4" strategy for the 2024–2028 period. The "1" stands for retention of tourism, and the "4" for areas for development: health and traditional medicine; finance; technology; and sports and culture activities including conferences and exhibitions.

This strategy relies on targeted fiscal incentives; a 2024 study showed that the technology sector was the most responsive to these incentives, with an elasticity coefficient of 0.28, followed by cultural tourism at 0.22.

== Political economy and social welfare ==
Prior to the 1930s Macau had a Laissez-Faire type of welfare provision. Publicly funded schools available were taught in Portuguese. The first welfare program was created in the late 1930s – it was called the Public Charity Society. The main objective of the organization is to provide for the poor and orphans. The development of a welfare state was gradual and primitive. In 1947, a number of reforms were made. Most notably, the social relief card was established which was only given to those in need. In the 60s the Public Relief Society became the Public Relief Branch. Services broaden to cover other areas such as disaster relief. This is an important addition because Macau have high risks of frequent typhoons. In addition, many facilities were also built, including rehabilitation centers and center for blind and deaf assistance. Throughout the 1960s and 1970s, housing was provided to the poor, disabled and elderly. Financial aid for health care and education is also provided to poor. During this period the government have also started subsidizing private schools. Another restructuring of the system happened in 1980. The Department of Social Welfare was officially established. Further adjustments were made in the late 80s that separated the department into three branches, including the Macao Governor, Social Welfare Committee and the Department for Social Welfare. It established four principles "equality, efficiency, mutual assistance and participation". Four offices were also set up in Santo António e São Lázaro, São Lourenço e Sé, Nossa Senhora de Fátima, and Ilias. The purpose of these offices is to make it more convenient for people to make a visit and for the workers to also get closer to the locals in their region. In the 90s, an additional office was set up in Ilha Verde due to high demand in the Northern region. The department also became increasingly involved in familial issues by offering counseling.

The Social Welfare Bureau – which remained to this day - was established after the handover to China in 1999. Initially Macau faced challenges from a weak economy and high unemployment rate but in 2002, gaming was legalized and increased the government revenue. Due to the rapid economic growth driven by the gambling industry, foreign investments and tourism, the government is now able to provide more public services. Macau's social welfare programs have grown to be comparable to the most developed countries in the world. Free healthcare is universal and offered in public hospitals but private services is also subsidized by 30%, for pregnant women, students, civil servants and people 65 and above, it is completely subsidized. The government extend benefits for many of these citizens. Improvements in the rise of employment and income is also linked to higher satisfaction with quality of life. The government provide 15 years of free education, social insurance and social assistance to all citizens. Similar to a lot of East Asian countries, the social welfare model in Macau does not fit neatly in "the three worlds of welfare capitalism". It has been argued that it functions more like a regulatory welfare regime.

Nevertheless, Macau's public sector appears to be quite small. Workers in the public sector is one of the highest paid occupation due to constitutional law that was set during the handover. Therefore, as a result the government often offer short-term or part-time contracts to make it more affordable although contracts usually get renewed. It is reported that many workers in the police force have left to work in casinos for better pay. Economic growth also brings inequality, competition is getting higher as more foreigner and mainland workers are overtaking local poor in skills. This evidently produced an increase in citizen participation in elections and protests. The focus on the gambling and tourism industry also come at the expense of other sectors. As of 2009, 44.9% of labor work in the tourist industry. It is reported in 2006 that 44 times the population of Macau visited the city that year. Furthermore, all profitable big business like hotels and casinos are owned by foreign investors, which comes at the expense of local family businesses. This had led to a violent protest on Labor Day in 2007. No such civil unrest has ever been record in Macau history before or after the handover but it caught real attention because the city had a GDP growth of 17% the year prior.

== Labor and employment ==
Employed population by occupation 2007
Occupation	No. in thousands
Senior officials/managers	14.6
Professionals	9.9
Technicians	28.1
Clerks	83.7
Service & sale workers	63.2
Workers in agriculture/fishery	0.8
Craft & similar workers	33.7

The work force in Macau is mainly composed of manufacturing; construction; wholesale and retail; hotels and restaurants; financial services, real estate, and other business activities; public administration and other personal and social services, including gaming; transport, storage and communications. Due to the double-digit economic growth in recent years, the unemployment rate dropped from the record high 6.8% in 2000 to 3.1% in Qtr 3, 2007.

With the opening of several casino resorts and other major constructions underway, it is reported that many sectors, especially the construction sector, experience a shortage of labour. The government responds by importing labour from other neighboring regions, including mainland China, Hong Kong, the Philippines and India. Currently the number of imported labours stands at a record high of 75,391 (Q2 2007), representing more than a quarter of the labour force in Macau. Some local workers complain about the lack of jobs due to the influx of cheap imported labour. Some also claim that the problem of illegal labour is severe. Another concern is the widening of income inequality in the region: Macau's Gini coefficient, a popular measure of income inequality where a low value indicates a more equal income distribution, rises from 0.43 in 1998 to 0.48 in 2006. It is higher than those of other neighboring regions, such as mainland China (0.447), South Korea (0.316) and Singapore (0.425).

== Monetary system ==
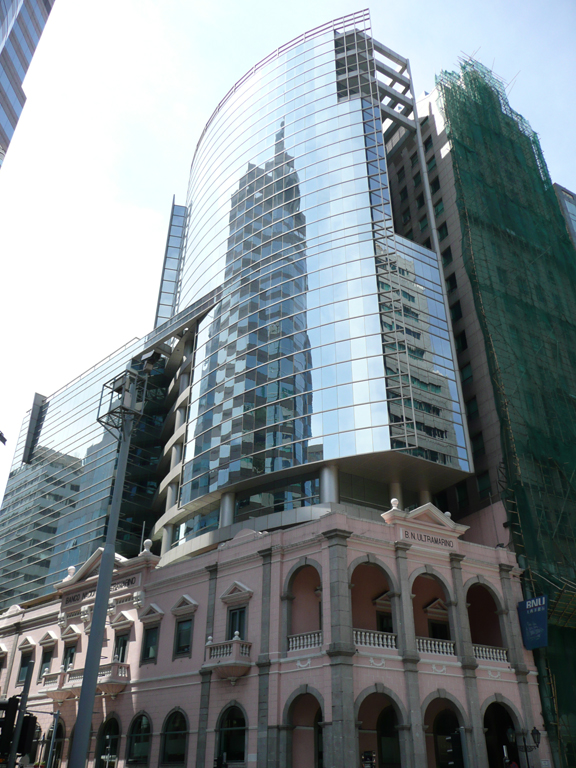
BNU Tower in Macau.

Macau adopts the so-called currency board system under which the legal tender, pataca (MOP), is 100 percent backed by foreign exchange reserves and the Hong Kong dollar (HKD). Moreover, the currency board, Monetary Authority of Macao (AMCM), has a statutory obligation to issue and redeem pataca on demand against Hong Kong dollar at a fixed exchange rate and without limit. The pataca is pegged to the Hong Kong dollar at a rate of 1.03 MOP per HKD, which is maintained by the AMCM.

Each pataca divides into 100 avos. Coins are issued in 10, 20, and 50 avos and 1, 2, 5, and 10 patacas (2 and 10 patacas coins are rarely used in the territory); notes are in 5, 10, 20, 50, 100, 500, and 1000 pataca denominations. Hong Kong dollar is freely used and accounts for more than half of the total deposits in Macau's banks. In addition, Chinese yuan is also widely accepted. Two banks issue currency: the Banco Nacional Ultramarino and the Bank of China (starting from October 1995). The historical exchange rates between the pataca and the US dollar (USD) are given below.

MOP per USD	Period
8.01	2000
7.99	1999
7.98	1998
7.99	1997
7.962	1996
8.034	1993–95

== Trade ==
Exports of Macau by product category (2019) Chemical products Transportation Machines Mineral products Plastics and rubbers Metals Foodstuffs Precious metals Textiles Instruments Animal products Vegetable products Paper goods Footwear and headwear Miscellaneous Stone and glass Wood products Animal and vegetable bi-products Animal hides Arts and antiques Weapons

In 2003, China's Ministry of Commerce established Forum Macao in 2003. The Forum's objective is to increase economic ties between China and the Portuguese-speaking countries. Its permanent secretariat is located in Macau.

In 2011, Macau's market economy produced total exports of US$1.119 billion (MOP 8.94 billion) and consisted mainly of clothing, textiles, footwear, toys, electronics, machinery and parts. Total imports for the same period reached US$8.926 billion (MOP 71.32 billion), and consisted mostly of raw materials and semi-manufactured goods, consumer goods (foodstuffs, beverages, tobacco), capital goods, mineral fuels and oils. Macau's primary export partner in 2011 was Hong Kong (44.6%). Other exports go to mainland China (15.9%) and United States (7.9%). Macau import partners are mainland China (30.4%), Hong Kong (12%), France (10.4%), Switzerland (7.5%), Italy (7.5%), Japan (6.2%), and United States (6.1%).

In the second half of the 20th century, Macau's economy was diversified with the development of light industry, the influx of migrants from mainland China to serve as a labor force, and increased tourism. Portugal's efforts to develop economic and cultural links between Macau and Brazil and Portuguese holdings in Africa, however, were not successful. Economic ties to the European Union and Taiwan are considered important aspects of Macau's economic role as part of the People's Republic of China. Direct access to the neighboring Zhuhai Special Economic Zone on Hengqin Island facilitates trade with mainland China. As a special administrative region, Macau functions as a free port and as a separate customs territory.

=== Hong Kong ===
Hong Kong is a top trading partner, with total trade in 2024 reaching approximately HK$76.9 billion. The relationship is supported by the Hong Kong–Macau Closer Economic Partnership Arrangement (HK–Macau CEPA) , ensuring free movement of goods (mainly jewelry, electronic equipment and luxury items) and encouraging investment under the Greater Bay Area initiatives.

=== Guangdong ===
The Guangdong–Hong Kong–Macao Greater Bay Area (GBA) is a high-level strategic city cluster comprising two Special Administrative Regions (Hong Kong and Macau) and nine cities in neighboring Guangdong Province. With a population exceeding 87 million and a GDP over RMB14.5 trillion (2024), it serves as a combined technology, financial, and logistics innovation hub.

== Energy ==
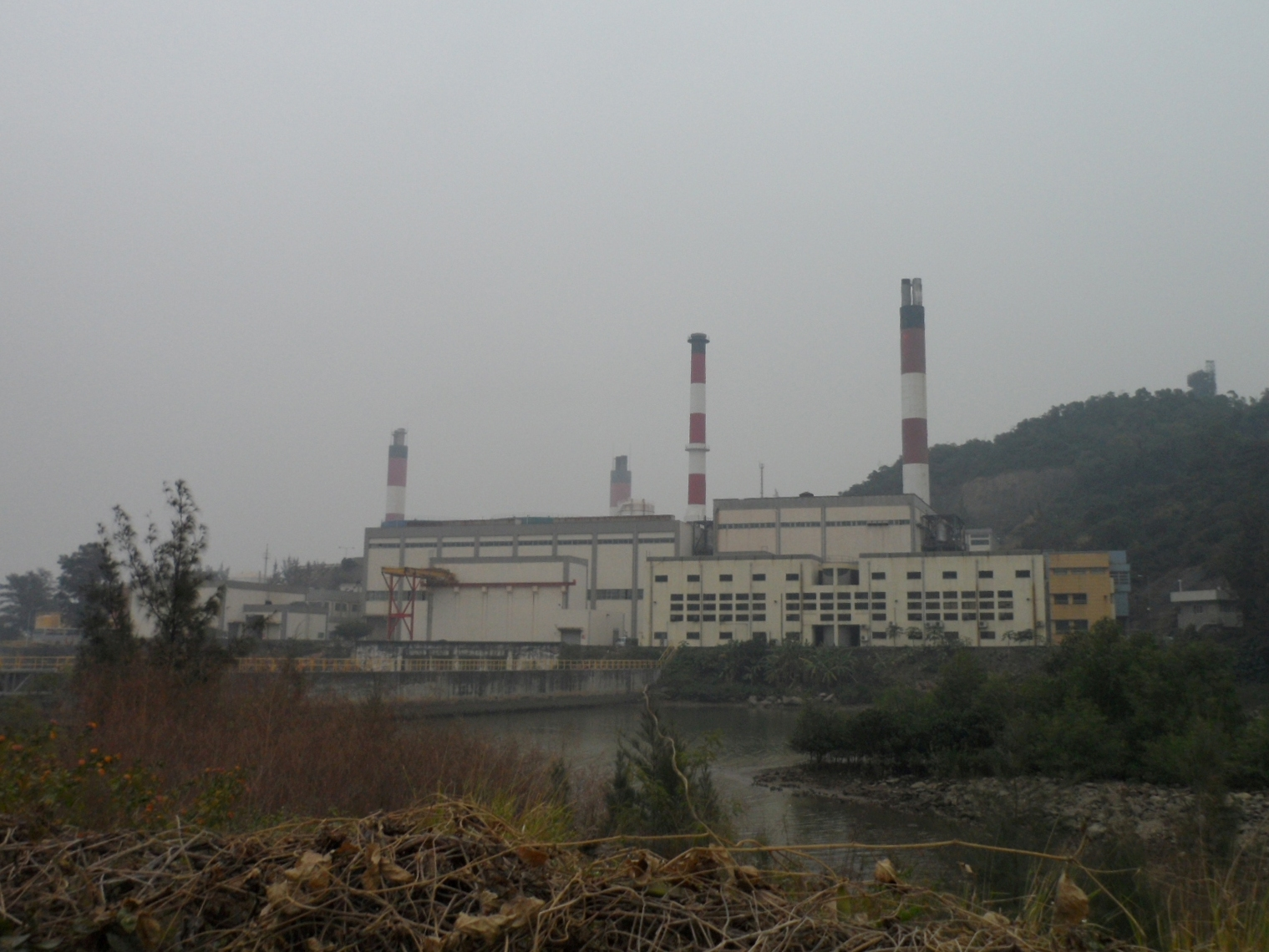
Coloane A Power Station

Electricity – production: 1.893 billion kWh (2004)
fossil fuel: 100%
hydro: 0%
nuclear: 0%
other: 0% (1998)
Electricity – consumption: 1.899 billion kWh (2004)
Electricity – exports: 0 kWh (2004)
Electricity – imports: 153.3 million kWh (2004)

== See also ==
- List of companies of Macau
- List of Macau people by net worth
- Economy of Hong Kong
- Economy of China
- Mainland and Macau Closer Economic Partnership Arrangement
- Bamboo network
- Agriculture in Macau
- Commission Against Corruption
- Gambling in Macau
- Immigration to Macau
- Tourism in Macau
- Individual Visit Scheme
- Shipyards in Macau
