= Hang Tau Tsuen =

Hang Tau Tsuen or Hang Tau Village (Chinese: 坑頭村), is the name of several villages in Hong Kong:

- Hang Tau Tsuen, North District, in Kwu Tung, Sheung Shui, North District
- Hang Tau Tsuen, Yuen Long District, in Ping Shan, Yuen Long District
