= Immigration to Macau =

With the increase in prosperity and the expansion of the economy of Macau, there is a growing demand from all over the world for residency in the Special Administrative Region.

Immigration Services are under the Public Security Police Force.

== Immigration Categories ==
There are 4 categories for Macau Residency Application, including:

- Foreign investors currently engaged in manufacturing, services, hotels or similar industries
- Potential foreign investors who plan to invest in industrial units, service industries, hotel industries or similar industries
- Investment in fixed assets or other tangible productive assets - most notably is investment in real estate property
- Technical or "talent" immigrants - Management staff and professional technicians

== Criterion for investment in fixed assets ==
The criterion for investment in fixed assets was discontinued in 2007. It had allowed for residency with purchase of real estate valued at 1 million MOP or more, and the deposit of 500,000 MOP into a Macau bank account for seven years. The government announced in 2010 it had no intention to make the fixed asset investment plan available again.

== Applicants' spouses or cohabitators ==
According to the Investment Residency Law of Macau, such application may be extended to include the spouse of applicant, applicant's and his/ her spouse's parents, and applicant's and his/ her spouse's dependent minors. Therefore, a total of three generations may be qualified under this scheme together with the main applicant. The definition of “spouse” under Macau law includes those who are legally declared by the court as separated couples and those who have “lived” with the applicant for more than two years. Therefore, cohabitators are also qualified.

== Temporary residency card ==
If the application is approved by the relevant government body in Macau, a “Temporary Residency Card” will be issued to the applicant. This Temporary Residency Card will be valid for a maximum period of 18 months, if the application is under the category of investment project; or 3 years for other types of applications. They are renewable only if the above criteria are fulfilled. The residency will become permanent after seven years of temporary residency in Macau.
