= Chap Wai Kon =

Village in Sha Tin District, Hong Kong

Coordinates: 22.378475°N 114.205821°E

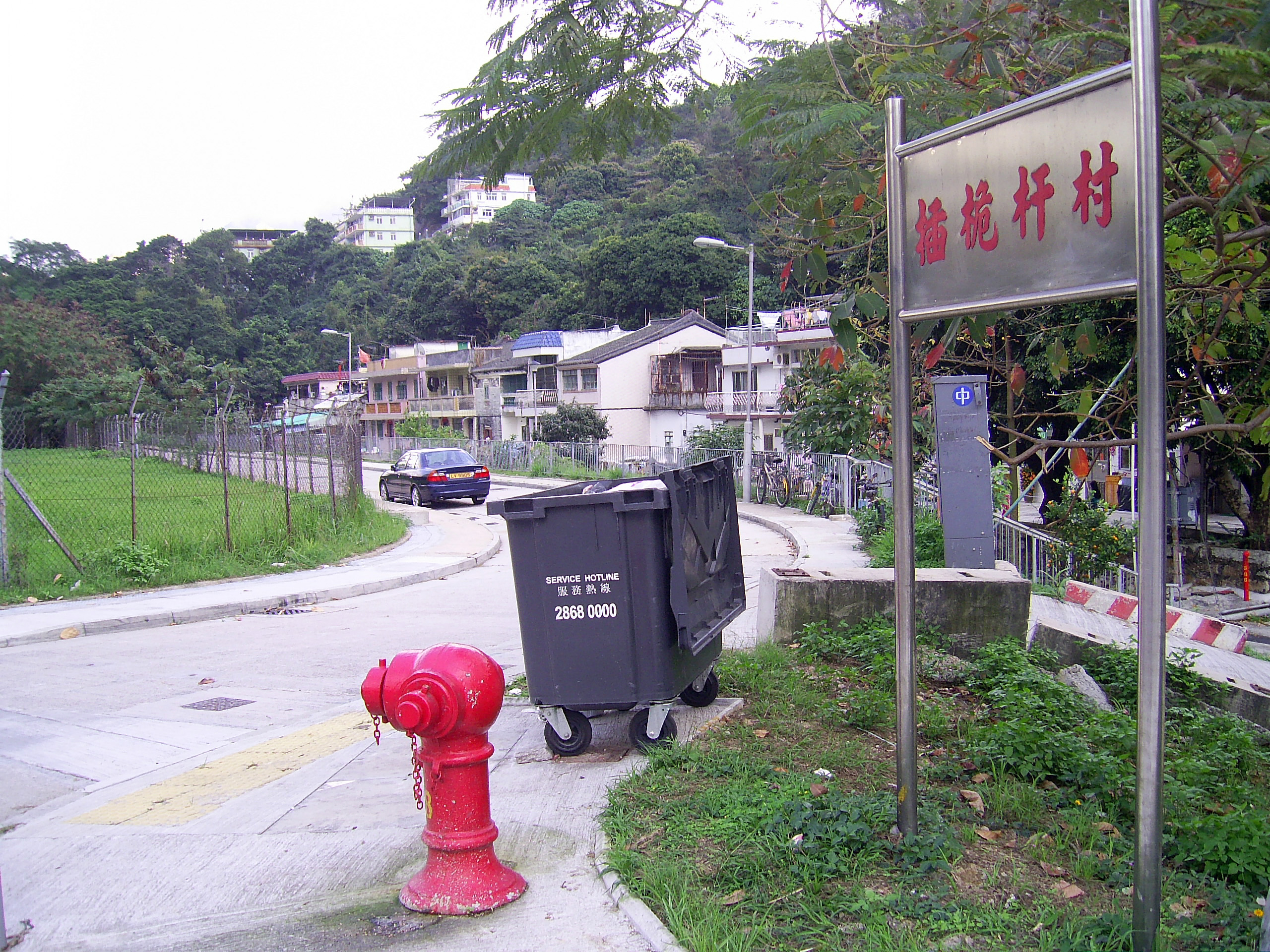
Chap Wai Kon in February 2010.

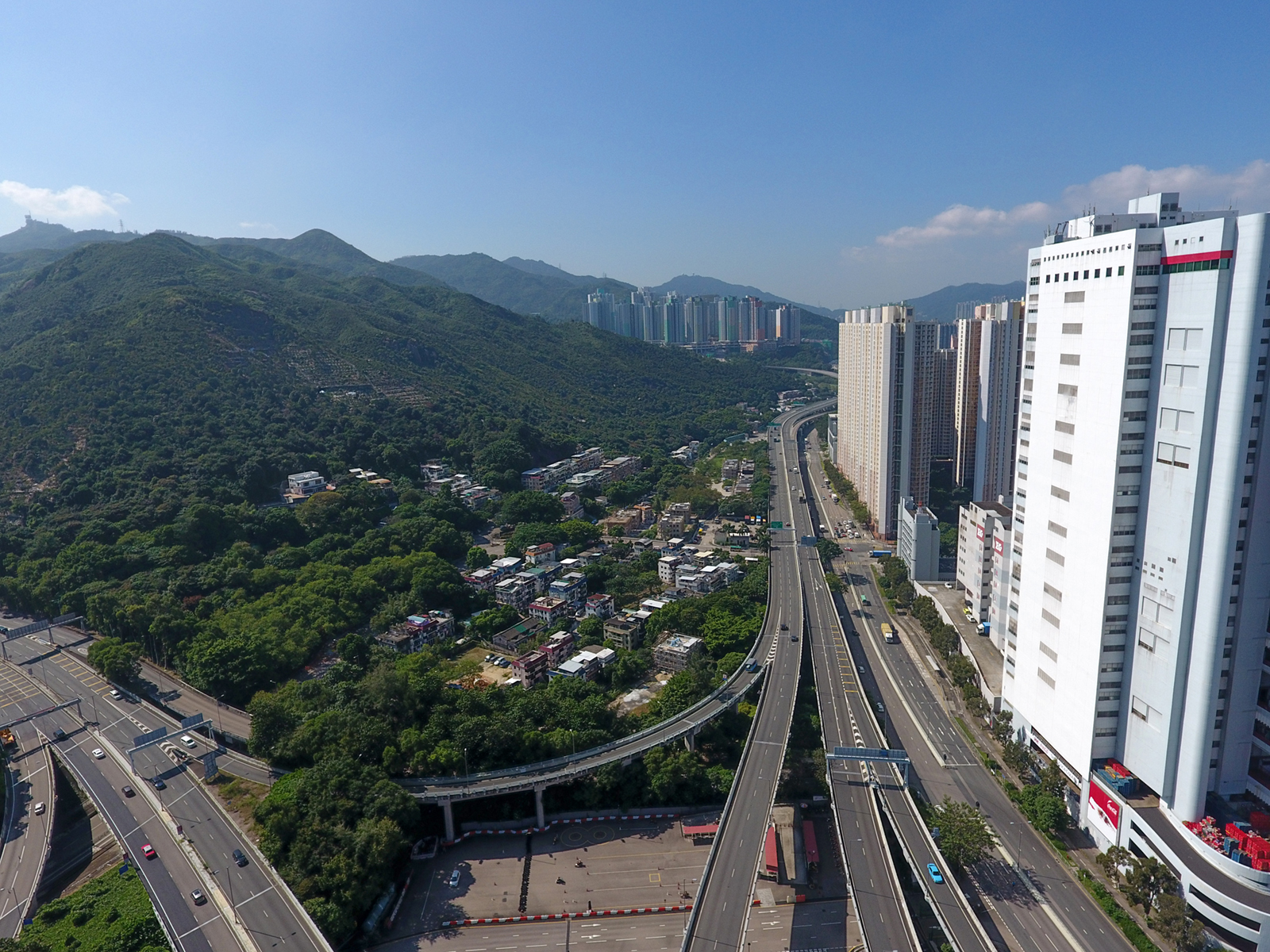
The villages of Ngau Pei Sha (front) and Chap Wai Kon (middle) are located at the foot of the hill. Taken in November 2016.

Chap Wai Kon (Chinese: 插桅杆) is a village in Sha Tin District, Hong Kong.

== Administration ==
Chap Wai Kon is a recognized village under the New Territories Small House Policy. It is one of the villages represented within the Sha Tin Rural Committee. For electoral purposes, Chap Wai Kon is part of the Yu Yan constituency, which was formerly represented by Lo Yuet-chau until July 2021.
