= Forum Macao =

Multi-lateral economic cooperation body

Forum Macao, officially the Forum for Economic and Trade Co-Operation Between China and Portuguese-Speaking Countries, is a multi-lateral economic cooperation forum established in 2003 by China's Ministry of Commerce.

== Structure and format ==
Forum Macao's objective is to increase economic ties between China and the Portuguese-speaking countries. As of 2023, the members of Forum Macao are: Angola, Brazil, Cape Verde, China, Guinea-Bissau, Mozambique, Portugal, São Tomé and Príncipe, and Timor-Leste.

Forum Macao has a permanent secretariat located in China's Macao Special Administrative Region. Macao was a colony of Portugal, and Portuguese continues to be one of its official languages. As a result, China views Macao as an ideal location for coordination with the Portuguese-speaking countries. Member countries have permanent representatives to the Forum who are also located in Macao.

Forum members discuss, and typically issue a post-meeting action plan covering, economic topics such as trade, agriculture, infrastructure, natural resources, and development, as well as cultural, media, and health issues. China seeks to build closer links between Forum Macao and the Belt and Road Initiative. Security cooperation and political cooperation have not been a significant element of Forum Macao.

== History ==
China's Ministry of Commerce established Forum Macao in 2003.

David H. Shinn and academic Joshua Eisenman write that São Tomé and Príncipe's presence at the 2006 Forum Macao meeting as an unofficial observer may have begun the process of São Tomé and Príncipe switching its diplomatic recognition from the Republic of China (Taiwan) to the People's Republic of China. It participated as an official observer for the first time in 2013. São Tomé and Príncipe recognized the People's Republic of China in 2016.

Due to the COVID-19 pandemic, the 2022 meeting of Forum Macao occurred via videolink and focused on pandemic-related issues.

As of 2023, there have been six minister-level meetings of Forum Macao.

== See also ==
- Economy of Macau
- Economic history of China (1949–present)
