= De La Salle Secondary School, N.T. =

Secondary school in Hong Kong

Coordinates: 22.5013°N 114.1107°E

- Chinese: 新界喇沙中學

Information
- Motto: Fides et Caritas (Faith and Charity)
- Religious affiliation: De La Salle Brothers
- Established: 1965; 61 years ago
- Principal: Dr. Lo Kwok Fai, Timmy (盧國輝)
- Enrollment: 661
- Language: Cantonese
- Website: www.delasalle.edu.hk/rIndex

De La Salle Secondary School, N.T. (DLS,Chinese: 新界喇沙中學), is a Catholic secondary school in Kam Tsin Tsuen, near Kwu Tung, in the New Territories of Hong Kong. It was established by the Brothers of the Christian Schools in 1965. It is one of the Lasallian schools in Hong Kong. (N.T. is the acronym of New Territories, a region in Hong Kong.)

Before 2007, the school was exclusively for boys from Forms 1 to 4. However, this policy has since been abolished, and the school is now co-educational.

Initially, English was used as the medium of instruction. The school began to use Cantonese to teach in 1987. Starting from 1997, it became the sole instructing language in classes.

== Brief history and development ==
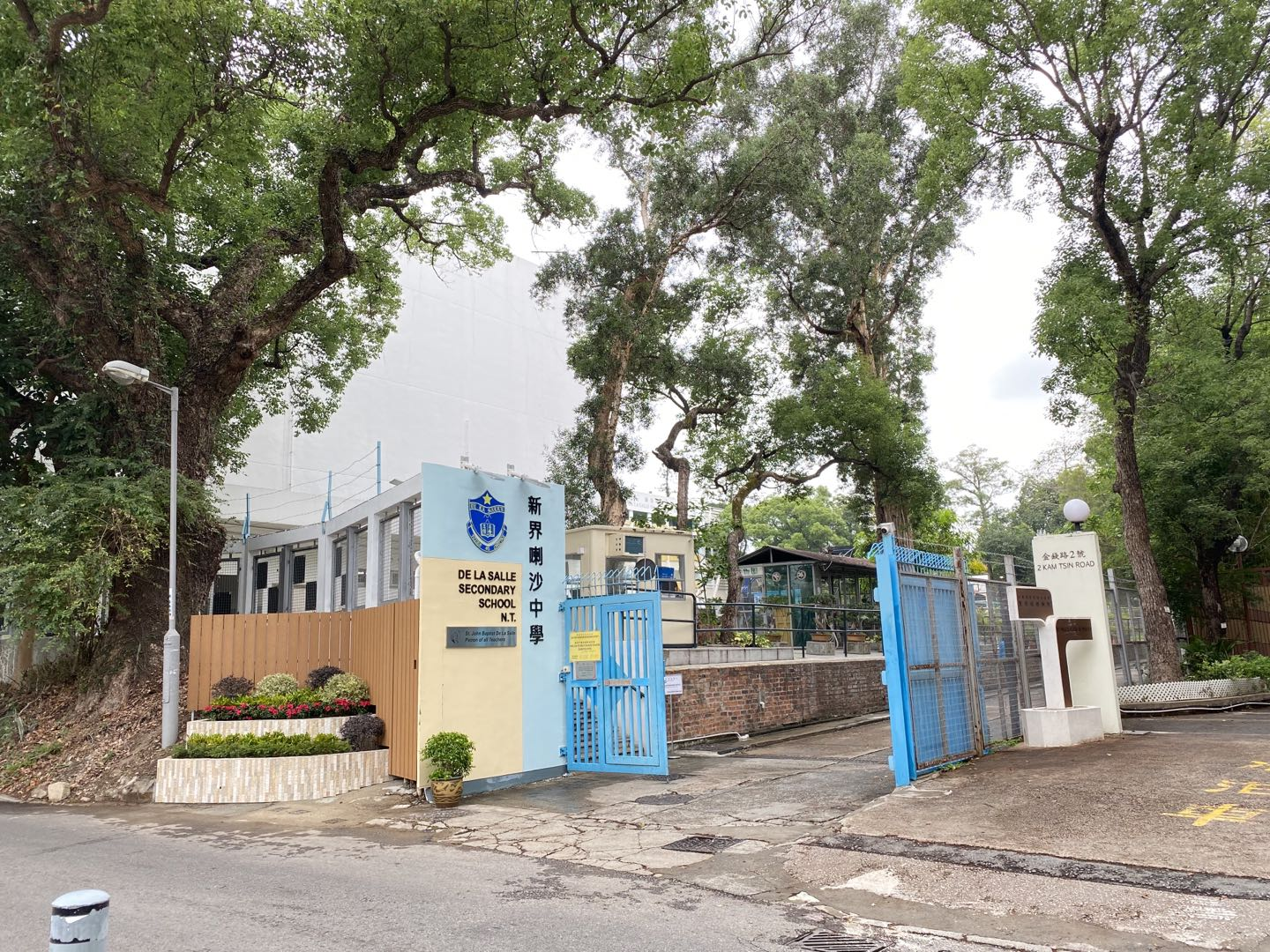
School main gate

De La Salle Secondary School, N. T., was established in 1965 under the zealous leadership of its first principal, Brother Felix Sheehan.

Among the Lasallian schools in Hong Kong, it has the distinction of being our only school with nature at its doorstep. The school has a grass football field and a large multi-purpose playground with basketball, handball and volleyball courts. There are also 2 covered areas, one where students can play badminton and the other where many extra-curricular activities are held.

With the support of teachers and parents, De La Salle Secondary School, N.T. has adopted Chinese as the medium of instruction.

Before 2007, De La Salle offered streaming for Forms 1 to 3, while Forms 4, 5, 6, and 7 were divided into classes based on students’ interests in either arts or science. Forms 1 to 4 were exclusively boys, whereas Forms 5 to 7 were co-educational. However, starting in 2007, all forms became co-educational.

The school badge has as its motto Fides et Caritas—Faith and Love—which reminds the school community that their spiritual values should manifest true love in action.

== See also ==
- Institute of the Brothers of the Christian Schools
- Lasallian universities and colleges
- Education in Hong Kong
- List of schools in Hong Kong
