= Ngau Pei Sha =

Coordinates: 22.38024°N 114.20858°E

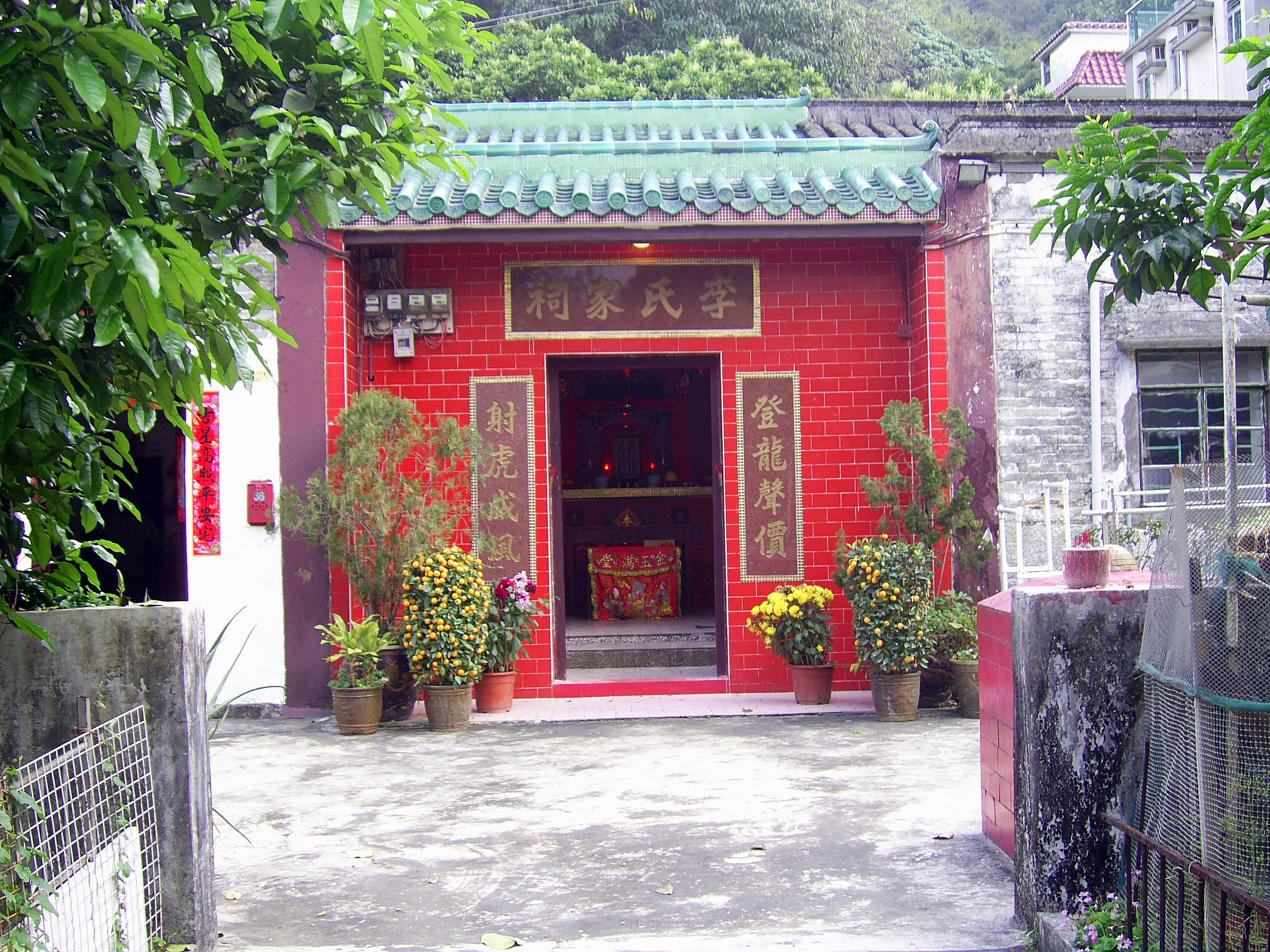
Li Ancestral Hall in Ngau Pei Sha in February 2010.

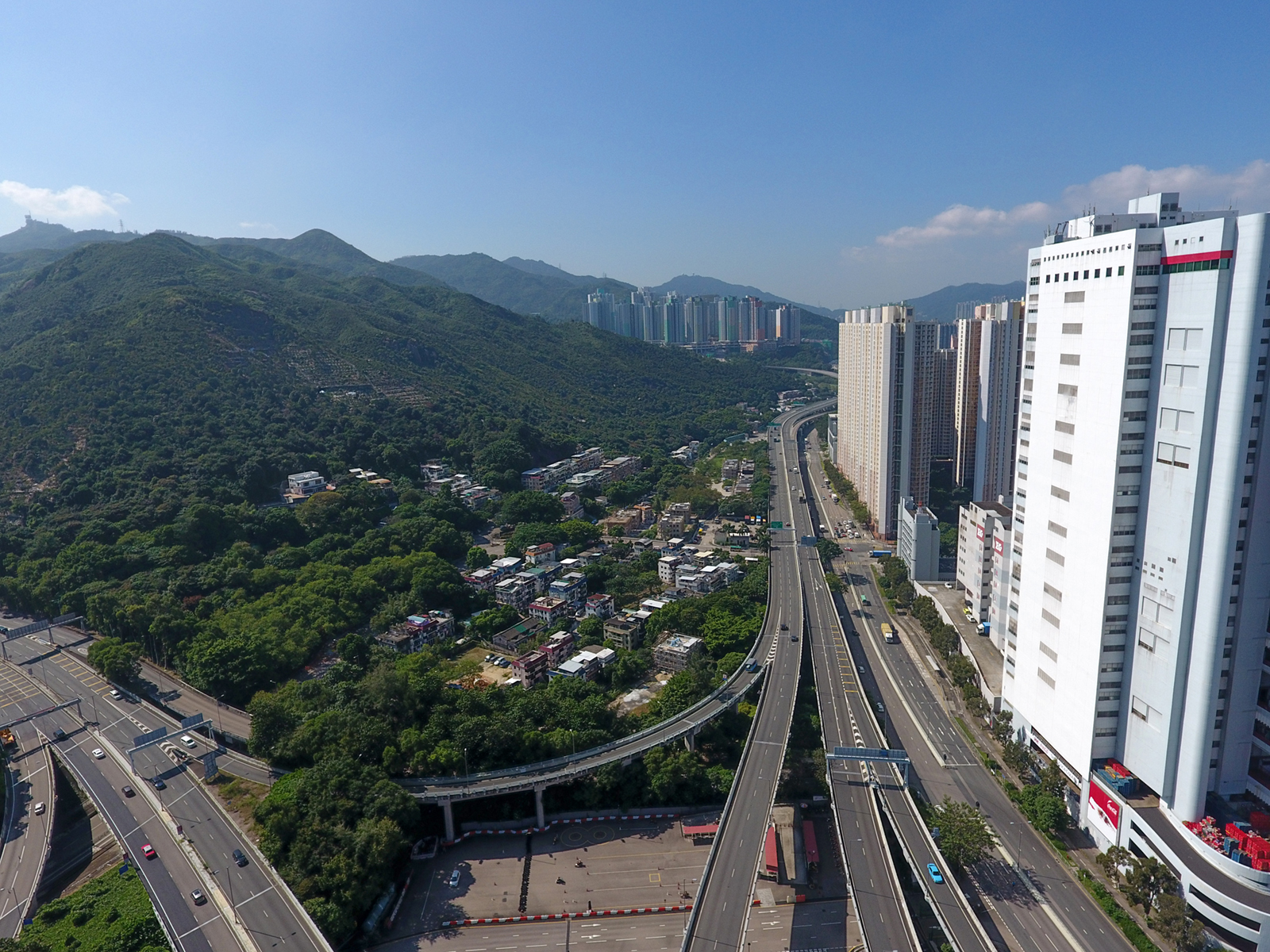
The villages of Ngau Pei Sha (front) and Chap Wai Kon (middle) are located at the foot of the hill. Taken in November 2016.

Ngau Pei Sha (Chinese: 牛皮沙) is a village in Siu Lek Yuen, Sha Tin District, Hong Kong.

== Administration ==
Ngau Pei Sha is a recognized village under the New Territories Small House Policy. It is one of the villages represented within the Sha Tin Rural Committee. For electoral purposes, Ngau Pei Sha is part of the Yu Yan constituency, which was formerly represented by Lo Yuet-chau until July 2021.
