= Hou Beiren =

Politician and painter (1917–2025)

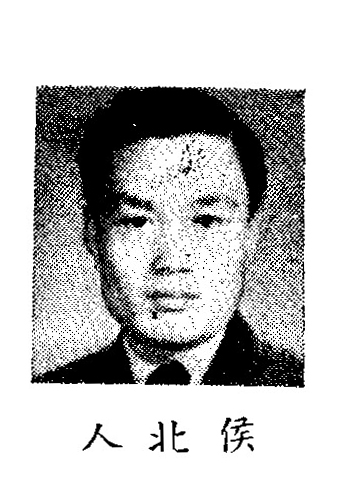
Hou Beiren

Hou Beiren (Chinese: 侯北人; 1917 – May 21, 2025), known as Shaozhang, was a Chinese-born-American politician and painter. He was a native of Haicheng, Liaoning.

== Life and career ==
Hou Beiren was born in 1917 in Haicheng, Liaoning Province. He graduated from Kyushu Imperial University, Japan. In his early years, he studied painting with Li Zhongchang in Hebei Province, and later studied with Huang Binhong and Zheng Shiqiao. In 1946, he was elected professional deputy to Andong Province for the Constituent National Assembly. On March 1, 1947, he was appointed a member of the Fourth Legislative Yuan of the Nationalist Government.

In 1956, Hou Beiren moved from Hong Kong to California, USA.

The Kunshan Municipal People's Government established the "Hou Beiren Art Museum", which opened in 2004.
