= Liao (surname) =

Liào
- Romanization: Liào (Mandarin); Lio, Liu, Liew, Liauw (Cantonese); Liāu (Taiwanese Hokkien)
- Language: Chinese

Origin
- Language: Old Chinese
- Meaning: Spacious, empty, vast

Other names
- Variant form: 𭙏 (Second round simplified)

Chinese name
- Chinese: 廖
Transcriptions
Standard Mandarin
- Hanyu Pinyin: liào
- Bopomofo: ㄌㄧㄠˋ
Hakka
- Pha̍k-fa-sṳ: liau
Yue: Cantonese
- Yale Romanization: liuh
- Jyutping: liu6
Southern Min
- Hokkien POJ: liāu

Liao (Chinese: 廖) is a Chinese surname, most commonly found in Taiwan and Southern China. Statistics show it is among the 100 most common surnames in mainland China; figures from the Ministry of Public Security showed it to be the 61st most common surname, shared by around 4.2 million Chinese citizens. Its primary ancient meaning is: “spacious,” “empty,” or “vast”. This meaning comes from the classical usage of the character 廖 in early Chinese texts.

The pinyin romanisation of the Mandarin pronunciation is Liào. Its Cantonese pronunciation is generally transcribed as Liew. Other romanisations of the name include Leo, Leow, Liau, Liaw, Liauw, Leeau, Lio, Liow, Leaw, Leou, Lau, Loh, Liu, Liêu, Liew, Liw, and Lew.

== Notable people surnamed Liao (廖) ==
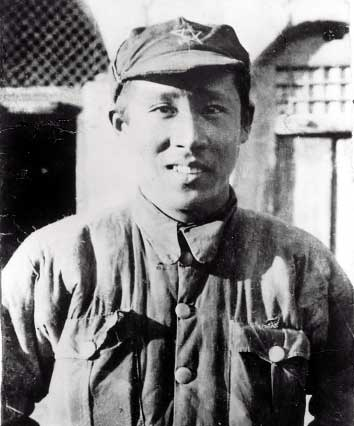
Liao Chengzhi, one of the most famous figures in China surnamed Liao

People with the surname Liao include:

- Ashley Liao (born 2001), American actress
- Bernice Liu (廖碧兒, born 1979), Canadian actress and former TVB model
- Gladys Liu, Hong Kong-born Australian politician
- Leslie Liao, American comedian
- Liao Cheng-hao, Minister of Justice of the Republic of China (1996–1998)
- Liao Chengzhi (1908–1983), Chinese politician
- Liao Chi-chun (1902–1976), Taiwanese oil painter and sculptor
- Liao Feng-teh (1951–2008), Taiwanese politician
- Liao Hua (died 264), military general
- Liao Hui (born 1942), Hong Kong politician
- Liao Hui (born 1987), Chinese weightlifter
- Liao Liou-yi, Magistrate of Taichung County (1989–1997)
- Liao Qiuyun (born 1995), Chinese weightlifter
- Liao Tianding
- Liao Yaoxiang (1906–1968), a high-ranking Kuomintang commander
- Liao Yiwu (born 1958), Chinese author and poet
- Liao Zhongkai (1877–1925), Kuomintang leader
- Liau Huei-fang, Deputy Minister of Labor of the Republic of China (2016–2017)
- Liow Han Heng, Singaporean convicted killer
- Martin Liao (born 1957), Hong Kong politician
- Julian Leow Beng Kim (born 1964), Malaysian Archbishop of the Roman Catholic Archdiocese of Kuala Lumpur

== See also ==
- Five Great Clans of the New Territories
