= List of Macau people by net worth =

This is a list of Macau billionaires based on an annual assessment of wealth and assets compiled and published by Forbes magazine in 2023.

== 2023 Macau billionaires list ==
World Rank	Name	Residency	Net worth (USD)	Source of wealth
2133	Hoi Kin Hong	Macau	1.3 billion	real estate

== See also ==
- The World's Billionaires
- List of countries by the number of billionaires
