= Agriculture in Macau =

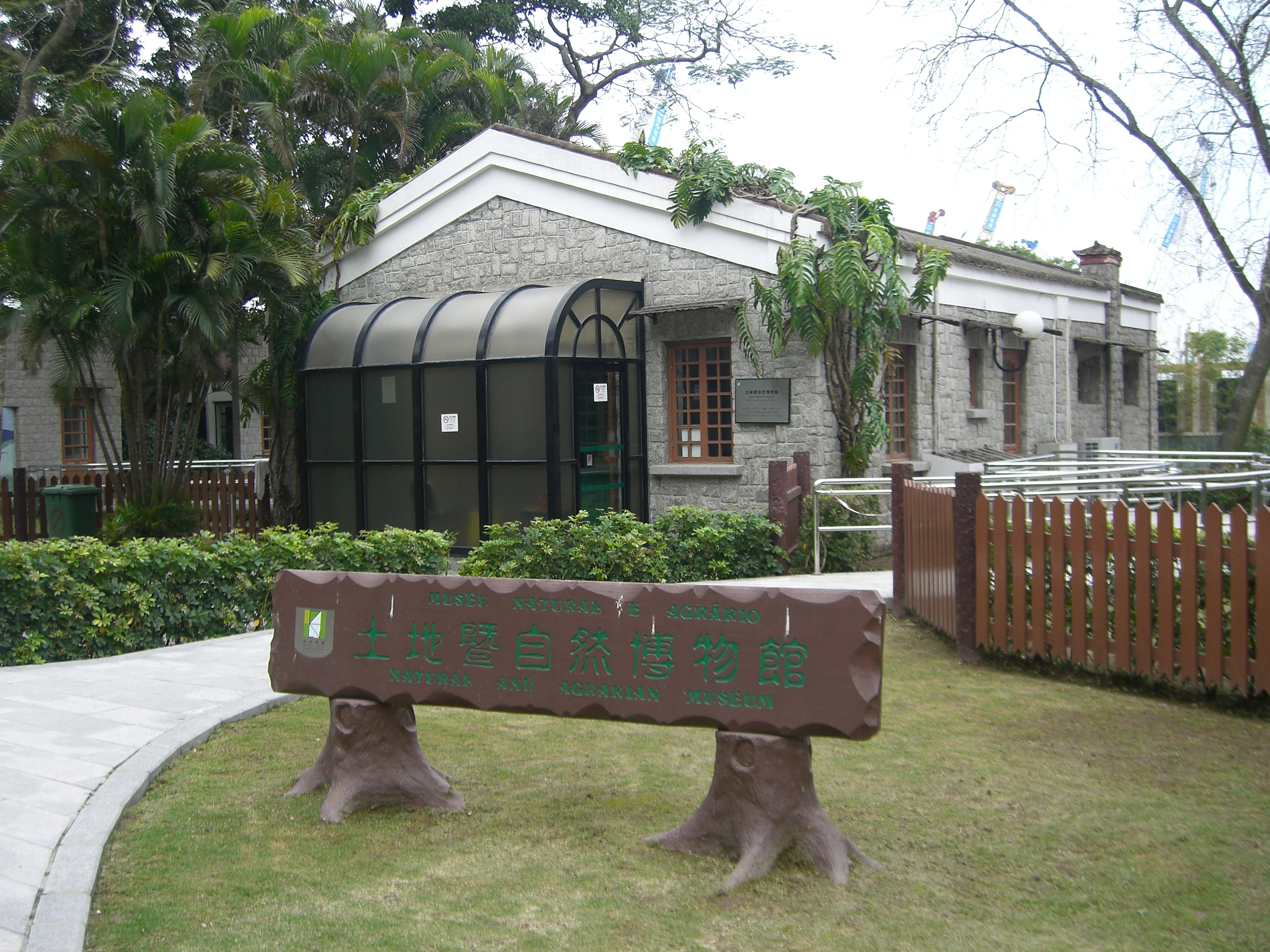
Natural and Agrarian Museum

Agriculture in Macau is a minor industry in Macau, China. Approximately 2% of Macau's land is used for agricultural purposes.

== History ==
Macau has been fully dependent on food imports since early ages, mainly from mainland China.

== Produce ==
Macau has a small area of land under cultivation to grow fresh vegetables. The territory also has a small livestock industry, which supplies chickens and ducks to restaurants. Macau also has a small fishing fleet, which supplies fish to restaurants and fish markets.

== Economy ==
Agriculture sector contributes around 1% of its gross domestic product (GDP). It employs less than 1% of the workforce in Macau.

== Tourism ==
- Natural and Agrarian Museum

== See also ==
- Economy of Macau
