= Hang Tau Tsuen, North District =

Coordinates: 22.491416°N 114.102238°E

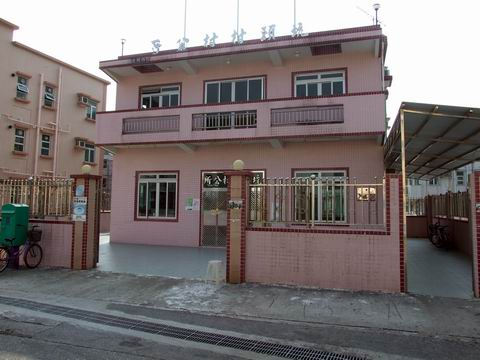
Hang Tau Rural Committee office.

Hang Tau Tsuen or Hang Tau Village (Chinese: 坑頭村) is a village in Sheung Shui, North District, Hong Kong.

== Administration ==
Hang Tau is a recognized village under the New Territories Small House Policy. Hang Tau Tsuen is one of the villages represented within the Sheung Shui District Rural Committee. For electoral purposes, Hang Tau Tsuen is part of the Sheung Shui Rural constituency, which is currently represented by Simon Hau Fuk-tat.
