= Sheung Shui Rural (constituency) =

- Elected constituency for the North District Council
- Boundary of Sheung Shui Rural in North District
- District: North
- Legislative Council constituency: New Territories North
- Population: 20,757 (2019)
- Electorate: 9,343 (2019)

Current constituency
- Created: 1994
- Number of members: One
- Member: Simon Hau Fuk-tat (Independent)

Sheung Shui Rural (Chinese: 上水鄉郊) is one of the 17 constituencies in the North District, Hong Kong.

The constituency returns one district councillor to the North District Council, with an election every four years.

Sheung Shui Rural constituency has an estimated population of 21,385.

== Councillors represented ==
| Election | Member | Party |
|---|---|---|
| 1994 | Hau Kam-lam | Nonpartisan |
| 2015 | Simon Hau Fuk-tat | Nonpartisan |

== Election results ==
=== 2010s ===
North District Council Election, 2019: Sheung Shui Rural
| Party | Candidate | Votes | % | ±% |
|---|---|---|---|---|
| Nonpartisan | Simon Hau Fuk-tat | 3,371 | 56.56 | |
| Ind. democrat | Hau Hiu-tung | 2,589 | 43.44 | |
| Majority | | 782 | 13.12 | |
| Turnout | | 6,002 | 64.29 | |
| Nonpartisan hold | | Swing | | |
