= Hou (surname) =

Hou (Chinese: 侯; pinyin: Hóu) is a Chinese surname, listed the 80th in the Hundred Family Surnames. It is romanized Hau in Cantonese. It originated from a Chinese nobility title, often translated as "marquis."

== Notable people ==
- Alyson Hau (Hou Jiaming), Hong Kong DJ/presenter
- Hau Yung Sang, Chinese/Republic of China international footballer
- Hou Baolin, Xiangsheng performer
- Hou Beiren, Chinese artist and politician
- Hou Bin, athlete
- Hou Ching-shan, Deputy Minister of Foreign Affairs of the Republic of China
- Hou Chong-wen, Deputy Mayor of Chiayi City
- Hou Dejian, songwriter from Taiwan
- Hou Hsiao-hsien, film director
- Hou Junji, Tang Dynasty general
- Hou Minghao, actor
- Hou Sheng-mao, Minister of Department of Health of the Republic of China (2005–2008)
- Hou Yanqi, diplomat
- Hou Yao, pioneering film director, screenwriter, and theorist
- Hou Yaowen, actor
- Hou Yifan, chess player
- Hou You-yi, Deputy Mayor of New Taipei City (2016–2018)
- John Hou Sæter, Norwegian football player
- Yi-Jia Susanne Hou, violinist
- Yojun Hou, Entrepreneur
- Hou Zhihui, Chinese weightlifter

== Fictional characters ==
- Ranka Hou, character from Mr. Driller

== See also ==
- Five Great Clans of the New Territories
