= List of public housing estates in Hong Kong =

This is a list of public housing estates in Hong Kong. Many of them are properties of Hong Kong Housing Authority (HKHA), while some of them are properties of Hong Kong Housing Society (HKHS).

== Central and Western District ==
=== Sai Wan (Kennedy Town) ===
Name		Type	Inaug.	No Blocks	No Units	Notes
Sai Wan Estate	西環邨	Public	1958	5	638	
Kwun Lung Lau	觀龍樓	Public	1968	8	2,335	HK Housing Society

== Wan Chai District ==
=== Tai Hang ===
Name		Type	Inaug.	No Blocks	No Units	Notes
Lai Tak Tsuen	勵德邨	Public	1975, 1976	3	2,677	HK Housing Society

== Eastern District ==
=== Chai Wan and Siu Sai Wan ===
Name		Type	Inaug.	No Blocks	No Units	Notes
Fung Wah Estate	峰華邨	TPS	1991	2	463	
Hing Man Estate	興民邨	Public	1982	3	1,999	
Hing Wah (I) Estate	興華(一)邨	Public	1971; 1999 after reconstruction	3	2,272	
Hing Wah (II) Estate	興華(二)邨	Public	1976	7	3,579	
Siu Sai Wan Estate	小西灣邨	Public	1990	12	6,160	
Tsui Lok Estate	翠樂邨	Public	1999	1	320	
Tsui Wan Estate	翠灣邨	TPS	1988	4	703	
Wan Tsui Estate	環翠邨	Public	1979	11	3,678	
Yue Wan Estate	漁灣邨	Public	1977	4	2,179	
Chai Wan Estate	柴灣邨	Public	1957; 2010 after reconstruction	2	1,600	
Wah Ha Estate	華廈邨	Public	2016	1	187	Converted from former Chai Wan Factory Estate, which was built in 1959.
Lin Tsui Estate	連翠邨	Public	2018	1	288	

=== Shau Kei Wan ===
Name		Type	Inaug.	No Blocks	No Units	Notes
Hing Tung Estate	興東邨	Public	1996	4	2,151	
Hong Tung Estate	康東邨	Public	1998	1	475	
Oi Tung Estate	愛東邨	Public	2001	6	3,207	
Yiu Tung Estate	耀東邨	Public	1997	11	5,305	
Ming Wah Dai Ha	明華大廈	Public	1962, 1963, 1965, 1978; 2019, 2024, 2034 after reconstruction	13 (9 after reconstruction)	3,169	HK Housing Society

=== Quarry Bay and North Point ===
Name		Type	Inaug.	No Blocks	No Units	Notes
Model Housing Estate	模範邨	Public	1954	7	667	
Healthy Village	健康村	Flat-for-Sale/Rental	1965	14	2,239	HK Housing Society

== Southern District ==
=== Ap Lei Chau ===
Name		Type	Inaug.	No Blocks	No Units	Notes
Ap Lei Chau Estate	鴨脷洲邨	Public	1980	8	4,453	
Lei Tung Estate	利東邨	TPS	1987	8	3,363	

=== Aberdeen, Kellett Bay and Waterfall Bay ===
Name		Type	Inaug.	No Blocks	No Units	Notes
Shek Pai Wan Estate	石排灣邨	Public	2006	4	2,877	
Tin Wan Estate	田灣邨	Public	1997	5	3,165	
Wah Fu (I) Estate	華富(一)邨	Public	1967	12	4,803	
Wah Fu (II) Estate	華富(二)邨	Public	1970	6	4,346	
Wah Kwai Estate	華貴邨	TPS	1990	6	1,413	
Yue Kwong Chuen	漁光村	Public	1965	5	1,175	HK Housing Society

=== Stanley ===
Name		Type	Inaug.	No Blocks	No Units	Notes
Ma Hang Estate	馬坑邨	Public	1993	5	916	

== Yau Tsim Mong District ==
=== Yau Ma Tei ===
Name		Type	Inaug.	No Blocks	No Units	Notes
Prosperous Garden	駿發花園	UIS/Rental	1991	5	1,564	HK Housing Society
Hoi Fu Court	海富苑	HOS/Public	1999	5	2800 (Rental only)	

== Sham Shui Po District ==
=== Cheung Sha Wan ===
Name		Type	Inaug.	No Blocks	No Units	Notes
Cheung Sha Wan Estate	長沙灣邨	Public	2013	2	1,400	Original estate demolished in 2001, but the new Cheung Sha Wan Estate was not in the same site as the original one but rebuilt from former Cheung Sha Wan Police Quarters.
Fortune Estate	幸福邨	Public	2000	3	2,125	
Hoi Lai Estate	海麗邨	Public	2004	12	4,908	
Lai Tsui Court (new)	麗翠苑	Public	2019	2	3, 850	
Lei Cheng Uk Estate	李鄭屋邨	TPS	1984	10	1,608	
So Uk Estate	蘇屋邨	Public	1960; 2016, 2018 and 2019 after reconstruction	14	10,753	
Un Chau Estate	元州邨	Public	1969; 1998, 2008, 2012 after reconstruction	14	7,800	Rebuilt from former Un Chau Street Government Low Cost Housing Estate, also known as Un Chau Street Estate, as well as former Cheung Sha Wan Factory Estate.
Hoi Ying Estate	海盈邨	Public	2018	2	1,319	
Hoi Tat Estate	海達邨	Public	2020; 2021; 2022	4	3,310	

=== Sham Shui Po ===
Name		Type	Inaug.	No Blocks	No Units	Notes
Cronin Garden	樂年花園	Flat-For-Sale	1995	7	728	HK Housing Society
Fu Cheong Estate	富昌邨	Public	2001	10	5,874	
Lai Kok Estate	麗閣邨	Public	1981	8	3,068	
Lai On Estate	麗安邨	Public	1993	5	1,438	
Nam Cheong Estate	南昌邨	Public	1989	9	1,898	
Wing Cheong Estate	榮昌邨	Public	2013	2	1488	

=== Shek Kip Mei ===
Name		Type	Inaug.	No Blocks	No Units	Notes
Chak On Estate	澤安邨	Public	1983	4	1,903	
Nam Shan Estate	南山邨	Public	1977	8	2,849	
Pak Tin Estate	白田邨	Public	1969–1979; 1993-2027 after reconstruction	currently 19; 25 after reconstruction	10,754	
Shek Kip Mei Estate	石硤尾邨	Public	1953; 1973, 2007, 2012, 2018 and 2019 after reconstruction	22	9,200	
Tai Hang Tung Estate	大坑東邨	Public	1980	9	2,101	
Tai Hang Sai Estate	大坑西邨	Private	1965	8		

== Kowloon City District ==
=== Hung Hom, To Kwa Wan, Ma Tau Wai ===
Name		Type	Inaug.	No Blocks	No Units	Notes
Hung Hom Estate	紅磡邨	Public	1999	2	835	
Ma Tau Wai Estate	馬頭圍邨	Public	1962	5	2,075	
Chun Seen Mei Chuen	真善美村	Public	1965	3	1,027	HK Housing Society
Ka Wai Chuen	家維邨	Flat-for-Sale/Rental	1984,1987,1990,1993	9	2,568	HK Housing Society
Lok Man Sun Chuen	樂民新村	Public	1970, 1971, 1973, 1974	9	3,676	HK Housing Society

=== Ho Man Tin ===
Name		Type	Inaug.	No Blocks	No Units	Notes
Ho Man Tin Estate	何文田邨	Public	1973; 1998 after reconstruction	9	4,738	
Oi Man Estate	愛民邨	Public	1974 and 75	12	6,289	
Sheung Lok Estate	常樂邨	Public	1998	1	358	

=== Kai Tak development area ===
Name		Type	Inaug.	No. Blocks	No. Units	Notes
Kai Ching Estate	啟晴邨	Public	2013	5	5,200	
Tak Long Estate	德朗邨	Public	2013	9	8,164	

== Wong Tai Sin District ==
=== Wong Tai Sin (Chuk Yuen) ===
Name		Type	Inaug.	No Blocks	No Units	Notes
Chuk Yuen (North) Estate	竹園北邨	TPS	1987	8	1,665	
Chuk Yuen (South) Estate	竹園南邨	Public	1984	8	6,621	
Tung Tau Estate	東頭邨	TPS	1959, 1961–65, 1967; 1981–82, 1985, 1987–88, 1990-92 after reconstruction	20	3,011	Also known as Tung Tau (II) Estate. Most of Tung Tau (I) Estate has been rebuilt as Tung Wui Estate, while the remaining former block 22 is under reconstruction.
Tung Wui Estate	東匯邨	TPS	2012, 2020	3	2, 333	Reconstructed from part of former Tung Tau (I) Estate.
Lower Wong Tai Sin (I) Estate	黃大仙下(一)邨	TPS	1957; 1989 after reconstruction	9	2,018	
Lower Wong Tai Sin (II) Estate	黃大仙下(二)邨	Public	1957; 1982 after reconstruction	15	6,779	
Upper Wong Tai Sin Estate	黃大仙上邨	Public	1963; 2000 and 09 after reconstruction	8	4,873	
Mei Tung Estate	美東邨	Public	1974, 1983, 2010, 2014	4	1500	

=== Diamond Hill ===
Name		Type	Inaug.	No Blocks	No Units	Notes
Fung Tak Estate	鳳德邨	TPS	1991	7	1,659	
Kai Chuen Court	啟鑽苑	Public	2021	2	1,018	

=== Lok Fu (Lo Fu Ngam) and Wang Tau Hom ===
Name		Type	Inaug.	No Blocks	No Units	Notes
Lok Fu Estate	樂富邨	Public	1957; 1984 after reconstruction	11	3,690	
Wang Tau Hom Estate	橫頭磡邨	Public	1982	18	5,900	

=== Ngau Chi Wan ===
Name		Type	Inaug.	No Blocks	No Units	Notes
Choi Fai Estate	彩輝邨	Public	1995	2	1,351	
Choi Hung Estate	彩虹邨	Public	1962	11	7,448	
Choi Wan (I) Estate	彩雲(一)邨	Public	1979	16	5,923	
Choi Wan (II) Estate	彩雲(二)邨	Public	1978	5	2,969	
Fu Shan Estate	富山邨	Public	1978;2020	4	1,600	

=== Tsz Wan Shan ===
Note: all the estates in Tsz Wan Shan, except Sha Tin Au Estate, have been rebuilt from former Tsz Wan Shan Estate, which was built in 1964 and demolished in 1990.

Name		Type	Inaug.	No Blocks	No Units	Notes
Shatin Pass Estate	沙田坳邨	Public	1967; 2011 after reconstruction	2	1,278	
Tsz Ching Estate	慈正邨	Public	1993, 2001	11	8,177	
Tsz Hong Estate	慈康邨	Public	2002	5	2,000	
Tsz Lok Estate	慈樂邨	Public	1995-2004	11	6,140	
Tsz Man Estate	慈民邨	Public	1994	3	2,043	

== Kwun Tong District ==
=== Kwun Tong ===
Name		Type	Inaug.	No Blocks	No Units	Notes
Tsui Ping (North) Estate	翠屏(北)邨	TPS	1982	12	3,913	
Tsui Ping (South) Estate	翠屏(南)邨	Public	1989	7	5,039	
Wan Hon Estate	雲漢邨	Public	1998	2	1,003	
Wo Lok Estate	和樂邨	Public	1962	11	1,941	
Hiu Yan Estate	曉茵邨	Public	2026	2	1,088	

=== Ngau Tau Kok and Kowloon Bay ===
Name		Type	Inaug.	No Blocks	No Units	Notes
Kai Yip Estate	啟業邨	Public	1981	6	4,300	
Lok Wah (North) Estate	樂華(北)邨	Public	1982, 1985	8	2,972	
Lok Wah (South) Estate	樂華(南)邨	Public	1982	6	6,998	
Lower Ngau Tau Kok Estate	牛頭角下邨	Public	1967; 2012 and 2015 after reconstruction	6	4,760	
Upper Ngau Tau Kok Estate	牛頭角上邨	Public	1967; 2002 and 2009 after reconstruction	9	6,700	
Kwun Tong Garden Estate/Lotus Tower	觀塘花園大廈/玉蓮臺	Public	1965, 1967, 1987, 1991	9	4,926	HK Housing Society; Lotus Tower is rebuilt from Kwun Tong Garden Estate Phase I in 1987 and 91.
Choi Ha Estate	彩霞邨	TPS	1989	3	790	
Choi Fook Estate	彩福邨	Public	2010, 2011, 2021	5	4,500	
Choi Tak Estate	彩德邨	Public	2010	8	5,800	
Choi Ying Estate	彩盈邨	Public	2008	5	3,900	
Ping Shek Estate	坪石邨	Public	1970	7	4,575	
Avis Tower	鴻鵠臺	Public	2026	1	370	HK Housing Society

=== Lam Tin ===
Name		Type	Inaug.	No Blocks	No Units	Notes
Hing Tin Estate	興田邨	TPS	1987	3	635	
Kai Tin Estate	啟田邨	Public	1997	3	2,355	
Kwong Tin Estate	廣田邨	Public	1992	4	2,453	
On Tin Estate	安田邨	Public	2005	2	720	
Ping Tin Estate	平田邨	Public	1997	8	5,721	
Tak Tin Estate	德田邨	TPS	1991	9	294	
Lam Tin Estate	藍田邨	Public	1966; 2009 after reconstruction	4	3,000	

=== Shun Lee ===
Name		Type	Inaug.	No Blocks	No Units	Notes
Shun Lee Estate	順利邨	Public	1978	7	4,461	
Shun On Estate	順安邨	Public	1978	3	3,002	
Shun Tin Estate	順天邨	Public	1981	11	7,026	

=== Yau Tong ===
Name		Type	Inaug.	No Blocks	No Units	Notes
Ko Cheung Court	高翔苑	Public	2004	5	1,800	Rebuilt from former Ko Chiu Road Estate, planned as HOS estate originally, but changed into public estate before sale
Ko Yee Estate	高怡邨	Public	1994	4	1,278	Rebuilt from former Ko Chiu Road Estate
Lei Yue Mun Estate	鯉魚門邨	Public	2001–02, 2007, 2016	5	3,639	
Yau Lai Estate	油麗邨	Public	2004, 2009–11, 2019	14	9, 004	
Yau Tong Estate	油塘邨	Public	1964; 2000 after reconstruction	5	3,596	

=== Sau Mau Ping ===
Name		Type	Inaug.	No Blocks	No Units	Notes
Po Tat Estate	寶達邨	Public	2001-03	13	7,434	
Sau Mau Ping Estate	秀茂坪邨	Public	1984, 1993, 1995, 2001, 2019	18	12,622	Reconstructed from part of Sau Mau Ping Resettlement area and Sau Mau Ping (Central) Estate Community Centre.
Sau Mau Ping (South) Estate	秀茂坪南邨	Public	2009	5	3,995	Reconstructed from part of Sau Mau Ping Resettlement area

=== Tai Sheung Tok ===
Name		Type	Inaug.	No Blocks	No Units	Notes
On Tat Estate	安達邨	Public	2016	11	9,400	
On Tai Estate	安泰邨	Public	2017-2018	11	8,561	

== Sai Kung District ==
=== Sai Kung Town ===
Name		Type	Inaug.	No Blocks	No Units	Notes
Lakeside Garden	翠塘花園	Mixed	1997	11	970	HK Housing Society
Tui Min Hoi Chuen	對面海邨	Public	1984-86	4	302	HK Housing Society

=== Tseung Kwan O ===
Name		Type	Inaug.	No Blocks	No Units	Notes
Choi Ming Court	彩明苑	Public	2001	4	2,800 (HOS excluded)	
Hau Tak Estate	厚德邨	Public	1993	6	4,271	
Kin Ming Estate	健明邨	Public	2003	10	7,018	
King Lam Estate	景林邨	TPS	1990	7	2,047	
Ming Tak Estate	明德邨	Public	1996	2	1,561	
Po Lam Estate	寶林邨	TPS	1988	7	2,322	
Sheung Tak Estate	尚德邨	Public	1998	9	5,561	
Tsui Lam Estate	翠林邨	TPS	1988	8	2,839	
Verbena Heights	茵怡花園	Flat-for-Sale/Rental	1996	7	2,865	HK Housing Society
Yee Ming Estate	怡明邨	Public	2014	3	2,059	

== Kwai Tsing District ==
=== Kwai Chung ===
Name		Type	Inaug.	No Blocks	No Units	Notes
High Prosperity Terrace	高盛臺	Public	2003	2	760	
Kwai Chung Estate	葵涌邨	Public	1964; 1997, 2000, 2005, 2008 after reconstruction	16	13,700	
Kwai Fong Estate	葵芳邨	Public	1971; 1987 after reconstruction	12	6,449	
Kwai Hing Estate	葵興邨	TPS	1970; 1991 after reconstruction	4	383	
Kwai Shing East Estate	葵盛東邨	Public	1973; 1989 after reconstruction	12	7,108	
Kwai Shing West Estate	葵盛西邨	Public	1975	10	5,261	
Kwai Tsui Estate	葵翠邨	Public	2018	2	886	
Lai King Estate	荔景邨	Public	1975-76; 2022	8	4,758	
Lai Yiu Estate	麗瑤邨	Public	1976	5	2,841	
On Yam Estate	安蔭邨	Public	1994-95	8	5,492	
Shek Lei (I) Estate	石籬(一)邨	Public	1985	9	4,989	
Shek Lei (II) Estate	石籬(二)邨	Public	1994	9	5,597	
Shek Yam East Estate	石蔭東邨	Public	1996	3	2,331	
Shek Yam Estate	石蔭邨	Public	1968; 2000 after reconstruction	3	2,331	
Tai Wo Hau Estate	大窩口邨	Public	1961; 1979-93 after reconstruction	17	7,860	
Wah Lai Estate	華荔邨	Public	2001	2	1,517	
Cho Yiu Chuen	祖堯邨	Public	1976, 1978, 1979, 1981	8	2,532	HK Housing Society
Kwai Luen Estate	葵聯邨	Public	2011, 2014	2	1,500	
Kwai Tsui Estate	葵翠邨	Public	2018	2	866	HK Housing Society

=== Tsing Yi ===
Name		Type	Inaug.	No Blocks	No Units	Notes
Broadview Garden	偉景花園	Flat-for-Sale/Rental	1991	7	1,776	HK Housing Society
Cheung Ching Estate	長青邨	Public	1977-83; 2024	10	5,270	
Cheung Fat Estate	長發邨	TPS	1989	4	2,067	
Cheung Hang Estate	長亨邨	Public	1990, 1994, 1995	6	4,689	
Cheung Hong Estate	長康邨	Public	1979-86	13	8,559	
Cheung On Estate	長安邨	TPS	1987-89	10	7,338	
Cheung Wang Estate	長宏邨	Public	2001, 2003	7	4,273	
Easeful Court	青逸軒	Public	2003	2	510	
Tsing Yi Estate	青衣邨	TPS	1986-89	4	930	

== Tsuen Wan District ==
Name		Type	Inaug.	No Blocks	No Units	Notes
Cheung Shan Estate	象山邨	Public	1978	3	1,621	
Fuk Loi Estate	福來邨	Public	1963	9	3,129	
Lei Muk Shue (I) Estate	梨木樹(一)邨	Public	1999	3	2,317	
Lei Muk Shue (II) Estate	梨木樹(二)邨	Public	1975	11	4,313	
Lei Muk Shue Estate	梨木樹邨	Public	1970, 2005	5	3,901	
Shek Wai Kok Estate	石圍角邨	Public	1980	8	6,491	
Bo Shek Mansion	寶石大廈	Flat-for-Sale/Rental	1996	3	669	HK Housing Society
Clague Garden Estate	祈德尊新邨	Flat-for-Sale/Rental	1989	3	1,478	Only Block C is for public housing; Blocks A and B are under Flat-for-Sale Scheme.
Moon Lok Dai Ha	滿樂大廈	Public	1964	4	947	HK Housing Society

== Tuen Mun District ==
Name		Type	Inaug.	No Blocks	No Units	Notes
Butterfly Estate	蝴蝶邨	Public	1983	6	5,405	
Fu Tai Estate	富泰邨	Public	2000	11	5,066	
Kin Sang Estate	建生邨	TPS	1989	4	685	
Leung King Estate	良景邨	TPS	1988	8	3,479	
Lung Yat Estate	龍逸邨	Public	2013	2	990	
On Ting Estate	安定邨	Public	1980	6	5,049	
Po Tin Estate	寶田邨	Public	2000	9	8,736	also Interim Housing
Sam Shing Estate	三聖邨	Public	1980	3	1,834	
Shan King Estate	山景邨	TPS	1983	9	6,892	
Tai Hing Estate	大興邨	Public	1977	7	8,602	
Tin King Estate	田景邨	TPS	1989	4	1,280	
Wu King Estate	湖景邨	Public	1982	6	4,386	
Yau Oi Estate	友愛邨	Public	1980	11	9,153	
Yan Tin Estate	欣田邨	Public	2018	5	4,687	
Wo Tin Estate	和田邨	Public	2022	4	4,232	
Ching Tin Estate	菁田邨	Public	2022	5	4,000	
Hin Fat Estate	顯發邨	Public	2024	1	872	
Yip Wong Estate	業旺邨	Public	2024, 2025	4	3,304	
Moon Tin Estate	滿田邨	Public	2025	1	1,020	

== Yuen Long District ==
=== Au Tau ===
Name		Type	Inaug.	No Blocks	No Units	Notes
Long Shin Estate	朗善邨	Public	2017	3	1,203	

=== Hung Shui Kiu ===
Name		Type	Inaug.	No Blocks	No Units	Notes
Hung Fuk Estate	洪福邨	Public	2015	9	4,900	
Eminence Tower Block 1	樂翹樓1座	Flat-for-Sale/Rental	2024	1	375	HK Housing Society

=== Yuen Long Town ===
Name		Type	Inaug.	No Blocks	No Units	Notes
Long Ping Estate	朗屏邨	TPS	1986	15	7,563	
Shui Pin Wai Estate	水邊圍邨	Public	1981	7	2,394	
Long Ching Estate	朗晴邨	Public	2016	2	483	Reconstructed from part of former Yuen Long Estate

=== Tin Shui Wai ===
Name		Type	Inaug.	No Blocks	No Units	Notes
Grandeur Terrace	俊宏軒	Public	2003	11	4,100	
Tin Chak Estate	天澤邨	Public	2001	6	4,216	
Tin Heng Estate	天恆邨	Public	2001	14	5,760	
Tin Shui (I) Estate	天瑞(一)邨	Public	1993	7	4,615	
Tin Shui (II) Estate	天瑞(二)邨	Public	1993	5	3,170	
Tin Tsz Estate	天慈邨	Public	1997	4	3,392	
Tin Wah Estate	天華邨	Public	1999	7	3,719	
Tin Yan Estate	天恩邨	Public	2002, 2004	8	5,640	
Tin Yat Estate	天逸邨	Public	2001	9	3,330	
Tin Yiu (I) Estate	天耀(一)邨	Public	1992	6	4,655	
Tin Yiu (II) Estate	天耀(二)邨	Public	1993	6	3,823	
Tin Yuet Estate	天悅邨	Public	2000-02	6	4,192	
Tin Ching Estate	天晴邨	Public	2008, 2010	7	6,200	

== North District ==
=== Fanling ===
Name		Type	Inaug.	No Blocks	No Units	Notes
Cheung Wah Estate	祥華邨	TPS	1984	10	2,471	
Fai Ming Estate	暉明邨	Public	2020	2	938	
Ka Fuk Estate	嘉福邨	Public	1994	3	2,045	
Queen's Hill Estate	皇后山邨	Public	2021; 2022	7	8,865	
Wah Ming Estate	華明邨	Public	1990	7	2,476	
Wah Sum Estate	華心邨	Public	1995	2	1,481	
Fung Wong Leng Estate	鳳凰嶺邨	Public	2026	3		
Yung Shing Court	雍盛苑	TPS	2000	2	1,729	
Casa Sierra	樂嶺都匯	Flat-for-Sale/Rental	2025, 2026	3	1,467	

=== Sheung Shui ===
Name		Type	Inaug.	No Blocks	No Units	Notes
Ching Ho Estate	清河邨	Public	2007, 2008	9	7,200	one extra block is under construction
Choi Yuen Estate	彩園邨	Public	1982	6	5,076	
Tai Ping Estate	太平邨	TPS	1989	4	424	
Tin Ping Estate	天平邨	TPS	1986	7	1,522	
Cheung Lung Wai Estate	祥龍圍邨	Public	2015	2	1,358	
Po Shek Wu Estate	寶石湖邨	Public	2019	3	1,144	
Choi Shek Estate	彩石邨	Public	2025; 2029	6	2,894	

=== Sha Tau Kok ===
Name		Type	Inaug.	No Blocks	No Units	Notes
Sha Tau Kok Chuen	沙頭角邨	Public	1988, 1989, 1991, 2017	52	802	The only public housing estate built inside the Frontier Closed Area.

== Tai Po District ==
Name		Type	Inaug.	No Blocks	No Units	Notes
Fu Heng Estate	富亨邨	TPS	1990	8	2,229	
Fu Shin Estate	富善邨	TPS	1985	6	4,600	
Kwong Fuk Estate	廣福邨	Public	1983	8	6,189	
Po Heung Estate	寶鄉邨	Public	2016	2	483	
Tai Wo Estate	太和邨	TPS	1989	9	2,582	
Tai Yuen Estate	大元邨	Public	1980	7	4,876	
Wan Tau Tong Estate	運頭塘邨	TPS	1991	3	870	
Fu Tip Estate	富蝶邨	Public	2021	1	655	

== Sha Tin District ==
=== Tai Wai ===
Name		Type	Inaug.	No Blocks	No Units	Notes
Chun Shek Estate	秦石邨	Public	1984	4	2,166	
Hin Keng Estate	顯徑邨	TPS	1986	8	1,004	
Hin Yiu Estate	顯耀邨	Public	2005	1	799	
Lung Hang Estate	隆亨邨	Public	1983	6	4,376	
Mei Lam Estate	美林邨	Public	1981	4	4,156	
Mei Tin Estate	美田邨	Public	2006, 2008, 2013	8	6,700	
Sun Chui Estate	新翠邨	Public	1983	8	6,692	
Sun Tin Wai Estate	新田圍邨	Public	1981	8	3,430	

=== Sha Tin ===
Name		Type	Inaug.	No. blocks	No. units	Notes
Fung Wo Estate	豐和邨	Public	2013	3	1,600	
Jat Min Chuen	乙明邨	Public	1981	3	3,730	HK Housing Society
Kwong Yuen Estate	廣源邨	TPS	1989	6	1,807	
Lek Yuen Estate	瀝源邨	Public	1975	7	3,219	
Pok Hong Estate	博康邨	TPS	1982	8	5,481	
Shui Chuen O Estate	水泉澳邨	Public	2014-15	18	11,123	
Sha Kok Estate	沙角邨	Public	1980	7	6,420	
Shek Mun Estate	碩門邨	Public	2009, 2018	2	2,000	Extra four blocks are under construction
Sunshine Grove	晴碧花園	Sandwich	1999	2	508	HK Housing Society
Wo Che Estate	禾輋邨	Public	1977	13	6,297	
Greenhill Villa	綠怡雅苑	SSFP	2019	3	1,020	HK Housing Society
Hong Lam Court	康林苑	HOS	1990	3	1,050	
Kwong Lam Court	廣林苑	HOS	1990	3	1,832	
Yu Chui Court	愉翠苑	HOS	2001	16	4,176	
Yue Shing Court	愉城苑	HOS	1980	4	530	
Yue Tin Court	愉田苑	HOS	1982	7	1,704	

=== Fo Tan ===
Name		Type	Inaug.	No Blocks	No Units	Notes
Chun Yeung Estate	駿洋邨	Public	2020	5	4,846	

== Islands District ==
=== Cheung Chau ===
Name		Type	Inaug.	No Blocks	No Units	Location
Cheung Kwai Estate	長貴邨	Public	1984	18	472	Cheung Chau
Nga Ning Court	雅寧苑	Public	2001	3	422	Cheung Chau

=== Mui Wo ===
Name		Type	Inaug.	No Blocks	No Units	Location
Ngan Wan Estate	銀灣邨	Public	1988	4	448	Mui Wo

=== Peng Chau ===
Name		Type	Inaug.	No Blocks	No Units	Location
Kam Peng Estate	金坪邨	Public	1996	1	253	Peng Chau

=== Tai O ===
Name		Type	Inaug.	No Blocks	No Units	Location
Lung Tin Estate	龍田邨	Public	1980,1995	9	552	Tai O

=== Tung Chung ===
Name		Type	Inaug.	No Blocks	No Units	Notes
Fu Tung Estate	富東邨	Public	1997	3	1,664	
Yat Tung (I) Estate	逸東(一)邨	Public	2001	13	5,597	
Yat Tung (II) Estate	逸東（二）邨	Public	2004-2005	12	6,400	
Ying Tung Estate	迎東邨	Public	2018	4	3,600	
Mun Tung Estate	滿東邨	Public	2018	4	3,866	
Cheung Tung Estate	翔東邨	Public	2025	5	4,800	
Chun Tung Estate	雋東邨	Public	2026	5	5,200	

== See also ==
- Public housing in Hong Kong
- Interim Housing
- List of Home Ownership Scheme courts in Hong Kong
- Hong Kong Housing Authority Exhibition Centre

== Notes ==
1. "Name" is the official name in English according to the Housing Authority
2. "Inaug" is the date of occupation of the earliest phase (if applicable)
3. "Type" - "Public" is traditional public rental housing; "Mixed" refers to projects where separate blocks earmarked for rental or sale; "Semi-private" refers to estates which have implemented TPS "right to buy" schemes
4. numbers of occupational units in blue may vary, as they refer not to numbers of units constructed, but unsold units per latest official information
