= Sunningdale Garden =

Public housing estate in Sheung Shui, Hong Kong

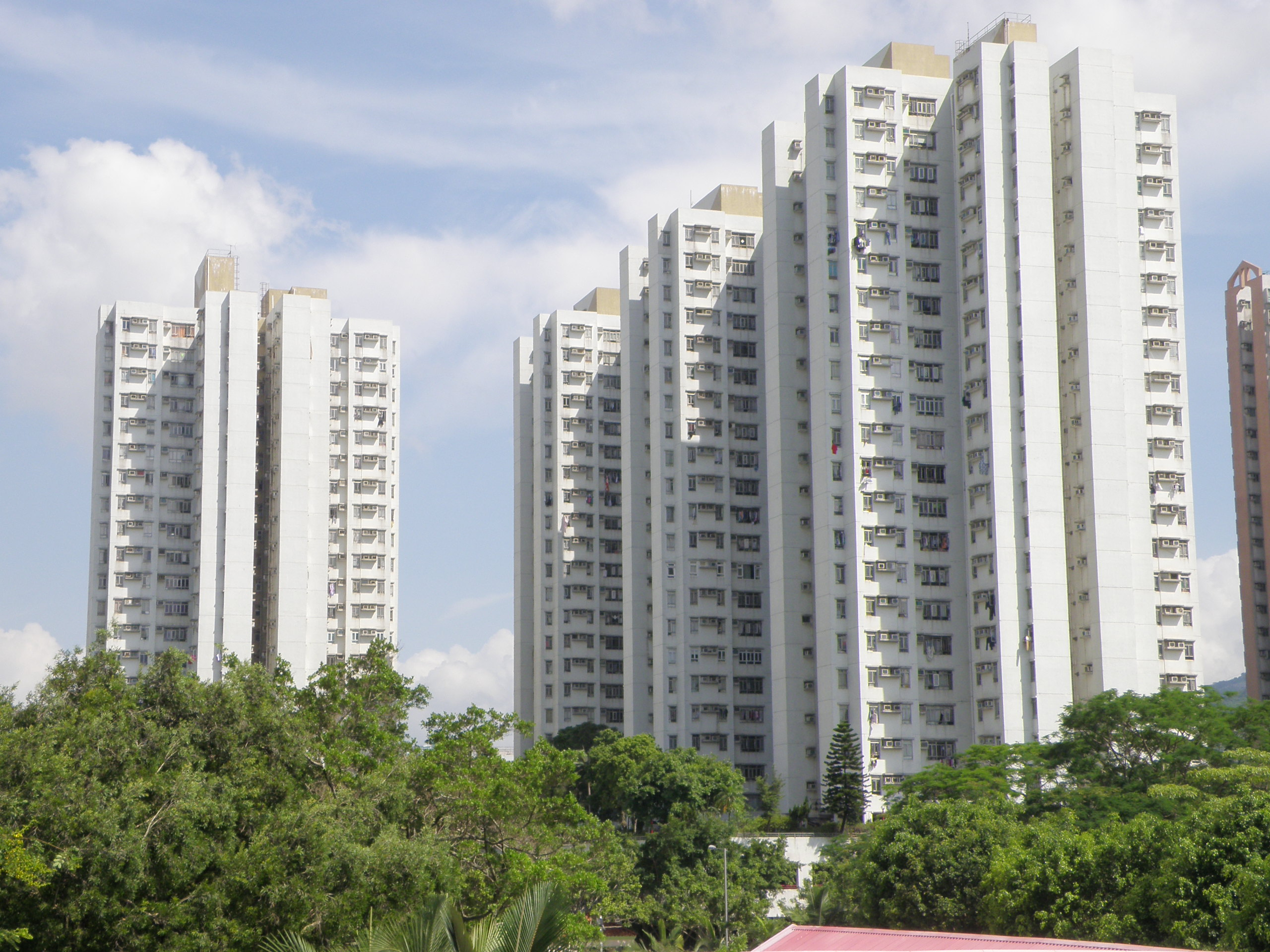
- Sunningdale Garden
- Interactive map of Sunningdale Garden

General information
- Location: 8 Chi Cheong Road, Sheung Shui; New Territories, Hong Kong
- Coordinates: 22.50156°N 114.13223°E
- Status: Completed
- Category: Home Ownership Scheme
- No. of blocks: 4
- No. of units: 830

Construction
- Constructed: 1992; 34 years ago
- Authority: Hong Kong Housing Authority

Sunningdale Garden (Chinese: 順欣花園) is a Home Ownership Scheme and Private Sector Participation Scheme court built on reclaimed land in Sheung Shui, New Territories, Hong Kong near Tin Ping Estate, Sheung Shui Town Centre and Shek Wu Hui. It has a total of two blocks built in 1992.

== Houses ==
Name	Chinese name	Building type	Completed
Block 1	第1座	Private Sector Participation Scheme	1992
Block 2	第2座	Private Sector Participation Scheme	1992
Block 3	第3座	Private Sector Participation Scheme	1992
Block 4	第4座	Private Sector Participation Scheme	1992

== Politics ==
Sunningdale Garden is located in Shek Wu Hui constituency of the North District Council. It was formerly represented by Lam Cheuk-ting, who was elected in the 2019 elections until March 2021.

== See also ==
- Public housing estates in Sheung Shui
