= Public housing estates in Sheung Shui =

Public housing in Sheung Shui, Hong Kong

The following is a list of public housing estates in Sheung Shui Town, Hong Kong, including Home Ownership Scheme (HOS), Private Sector Participation Scheme (PSPS), Sandwich Class Housing Scheme (SCHS), Flat-for-Sale Scheme (FFSS), and Tenants Purchase Scheme (TPS) estates.

== Overview ==
Name		Type	Inaug.	No Blocks	No Units	Notes
Cheung Lung Wai Estate	祥龍圍邨	Public	2015	2	1,358	
Ching Ho Estate	清河邨	Public	2007	8	7,200	
Choi Po Court	彩蒲苑	HOS	1984	4	2,112	
Choi Yuen Estate	彩園邨	Public	1982	6	5,076	
On Shing Court	安盛苑	HOS	1990	1	612	
Po Shek Wu Estate	寶石湖邨	Public	2019	3	1,144	
Sunningdale Garden	順欣花園	PSPS	1992	4	830	
Tai Ping Estate	太平邨	TPS	1989	4	424	
Tin Ping Estate	天平邨	TPS	1986	7	1,522	
Tsui Lai Garden	翠麗花園	PSPS	1990	6	2,012	
Yuk Po Court	旭埔苑	HOS	1982	8	1,248	

== Cheung Lung Wai Estate ==
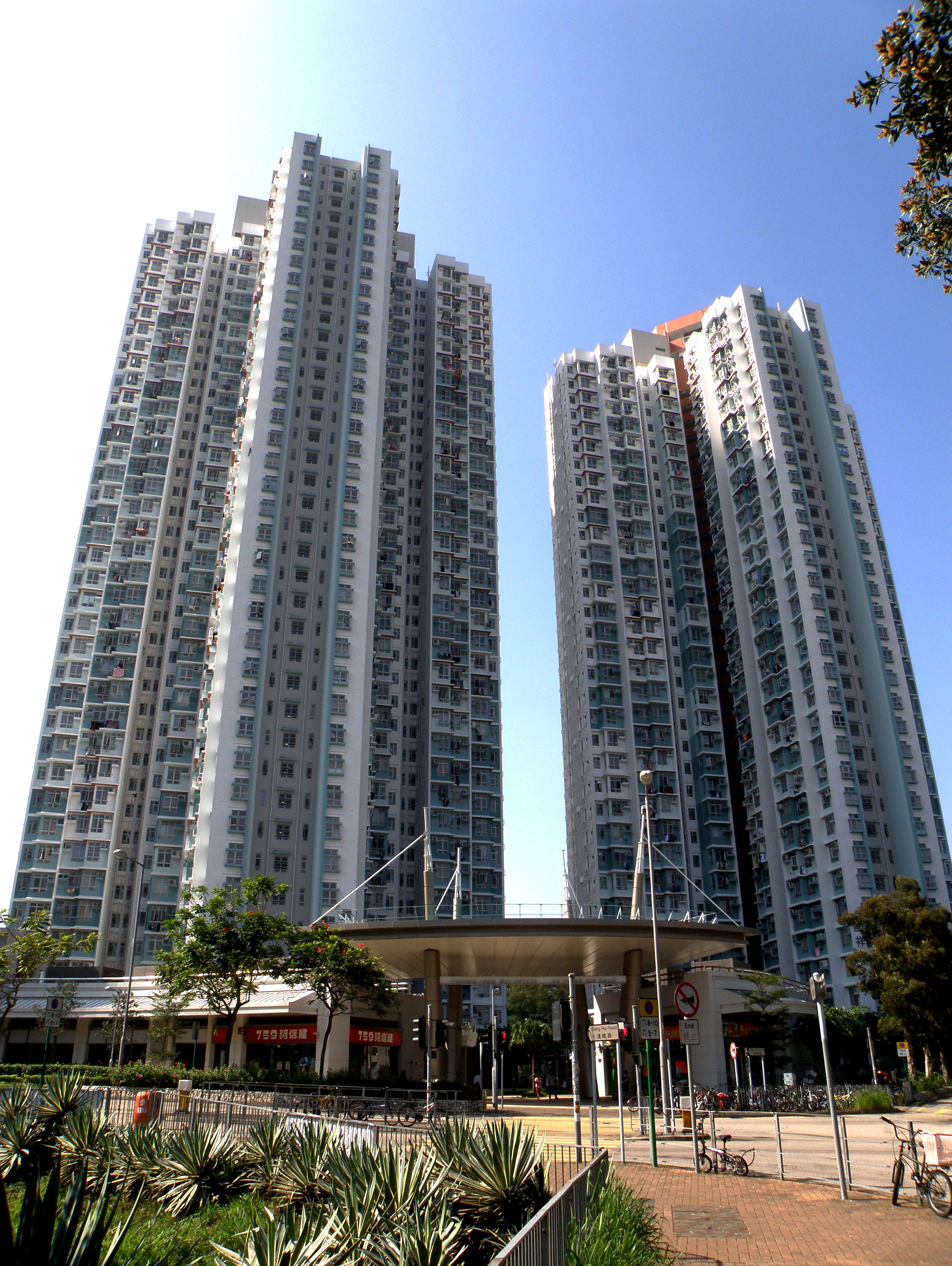
Cheung Lung Wai Estate

Cheung Lung Wai Estate is the latest public estate in North District. It had two blocks built in 2015.

Name	Type	Completion
Ching Cheung House (Block 1)	Non-standard (Cruciform)	2015
King Cheung House (Block 2)	Non-standard (Cruciform)	2015

== Ching Ho Estate ==
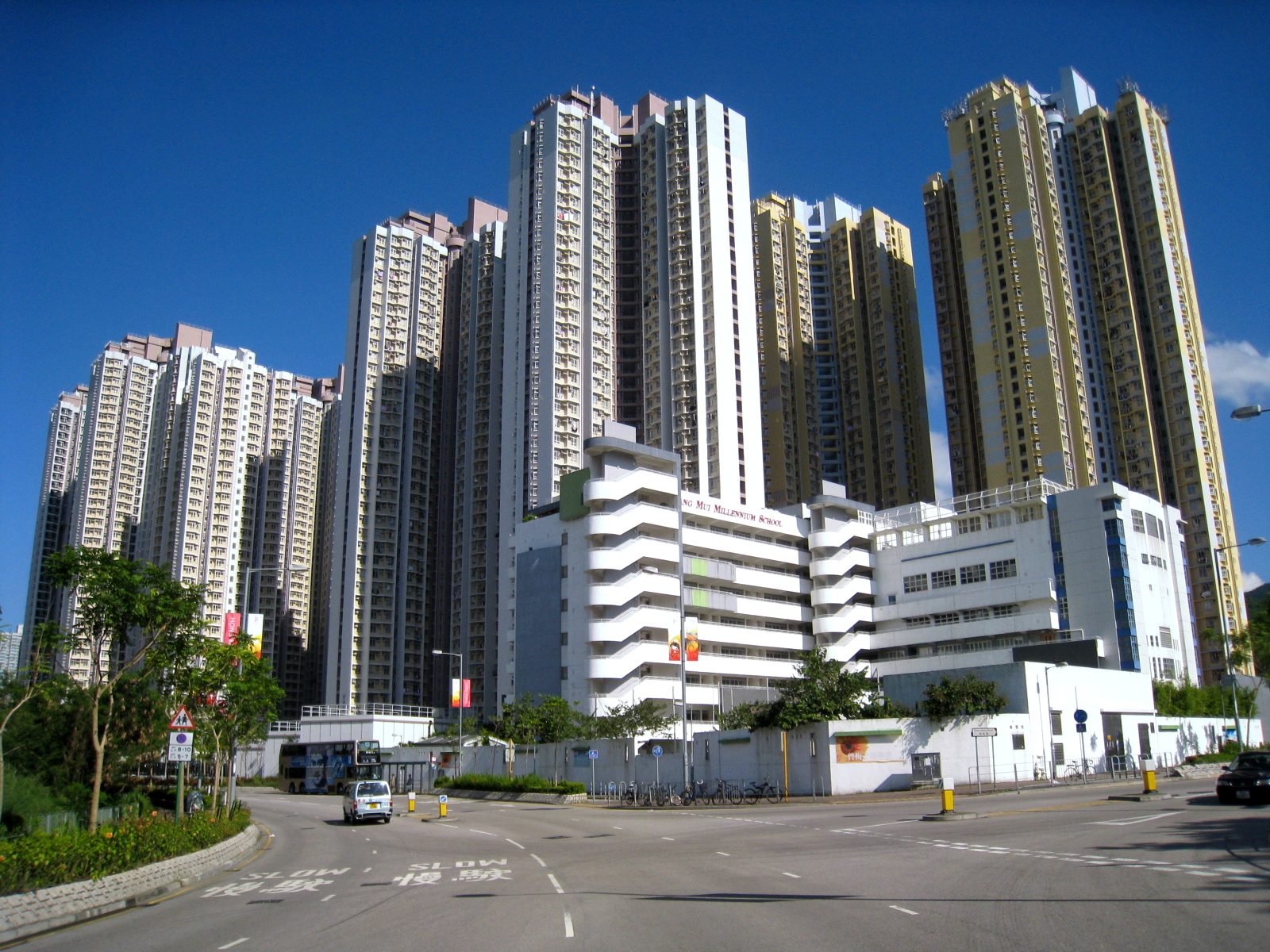
Ching Ho Estate

Ching Ho Estate (Chinese: 清河邨) is the second latest public estate in North District. Its name, "Ching Ho", means "clear river" in Chinese.

The estate is developed into there phases, with a total of eight "New Harmony" residential buildings and a shopping centre. Phase 3 consists of three blocks completed in 2007. Phase 2 and Phase 1 consists of a total of five blocks and the shopping centre completed in 2008.

Name	Type	Completion
Ching Chak House	New Harmony 1	2007
Ching Long House	New Harmony 1	2007
Ching Chiu House	New Harmony 1	2007
Ching Chung House	New Harmony 1	2008
Ching Ping House	New Harmony 1	2008
Ching Yun House	New Harmony 1	2008
Ching Yu House	New Harmony 1 with New Harmony Annex 5	2008
Ching Hin House	New Harmony 1 with New Harmony Annex 5	2008

Ching Long House was placed under lockdown for mandatory covid test on 15 February 2022.

== Choi Po Court ==
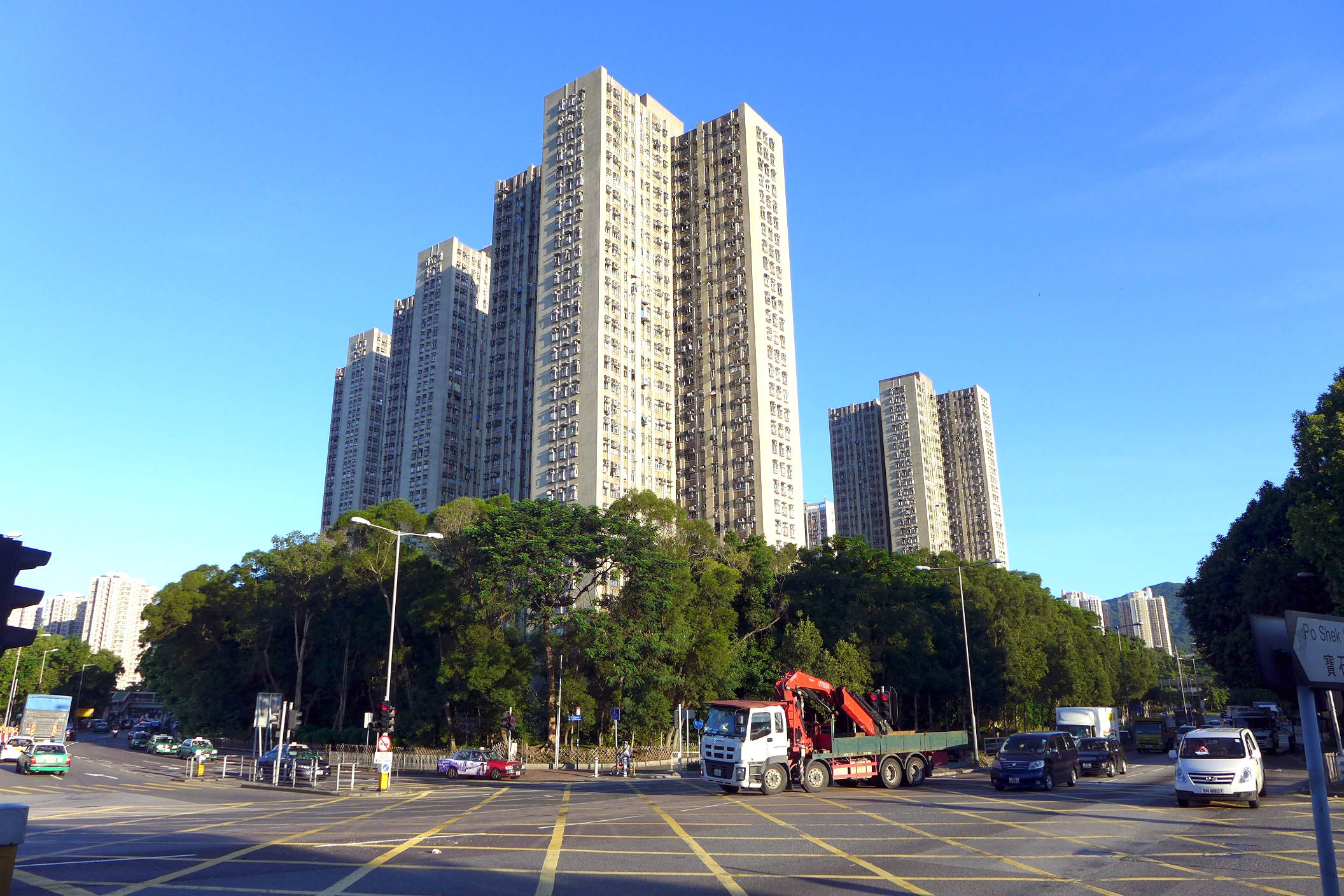
Choi Po Court

Choi Po Court (Chinese: 彩蒲苑) is an HOS housing estate in Sheung Shui Town, near Choi Yuen Estate and Sheung Shui station. It had four blocks built in 1982.

Name	Type	Completion
Choi Ying House	Windmill	1982
Choi Ching House	Windmill	1982
Choi Pik House	Windmill	1982
Choi Ngan House	Windmill	1982

== Choi Yuen Estate ==
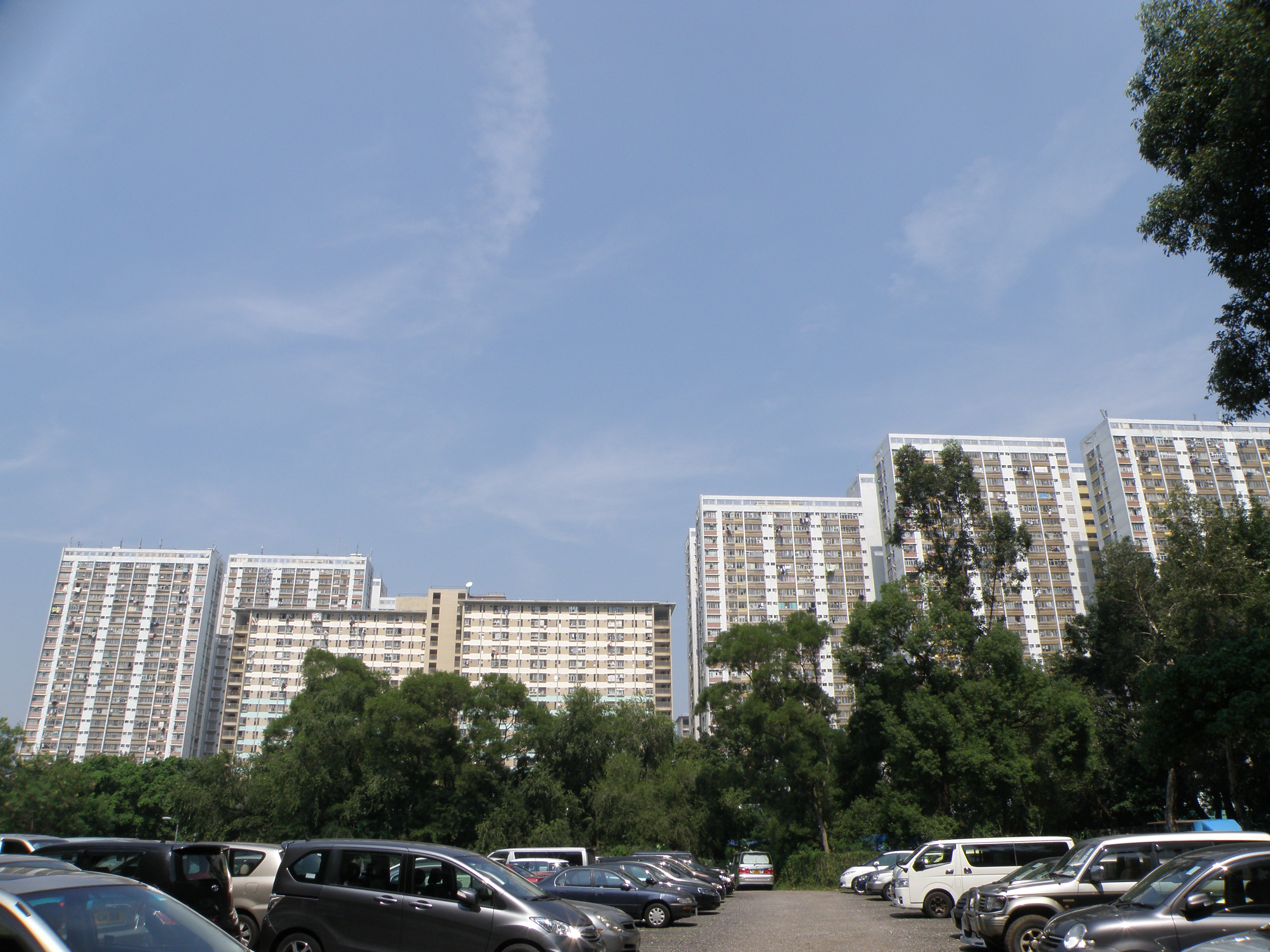
Choi Yuen Estate

Choi Yuen Estate (Chinese: 彩園邨) is a public estate located near Sheung Shui station and Landmark North in Sheung Shui Town. It is the first public housing estate in North District, which consists of 6 residential blocks built between 1981 and 1983.

The site of Choi Yuen Estate was formerly occupied by vegetable farms and the nearby village was called Tsoi Yuen Tsuen (Chinese: 菜園村), which meant Vegetable Farm Village in Chinese. In the 1970s, the vegetable farms were removed to construct Choi Yuen Estate; "菜園村" and "彩園邨" sound almost the same except the tone of the character "菜" / "彩". In the 1990s, the village was demolished to build Landmark North, one of the largest shopping malls in North District.

Name	Type	Completion
Choi Yuk House	Old Slab	1981
Choi Ping House	Old Slab	1981
Choi Chu House	Old Slab	1981
Choi Lai House	Old Slab	1981
Choi Wu House	Triple H	1981
Choi Wah House	Triple H	1983

== Po Shek Wu Estate ==
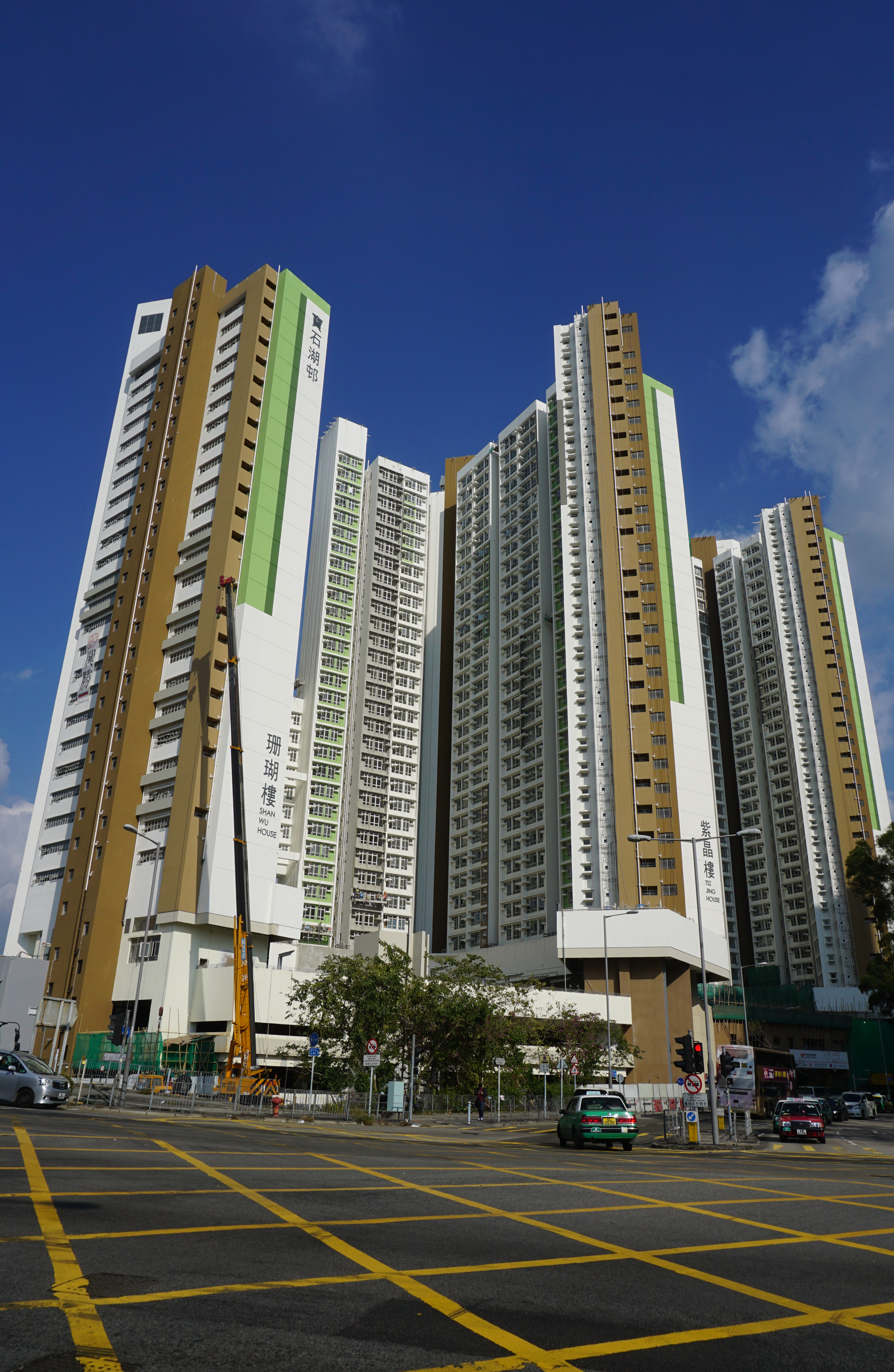
Po Shek Wu Estate

Po Shek Wu Estate (Chinese: 寶石湖邨) is a public housing estate at the junction of Po Shek Wu Road and Choi Yuen Road in Sheung Shui, near MTR Sheung Shui station. It comprises 3 blocks of 25, 29 and 33 storeys on a 3-storeyed carpark podium including one semi-basement storey for car park at a total number of 1,144 units. One ancillary facility block including socket-H pile foundation, superstructure and E&M services, one kindergarten, ground floor retail facilities and roof garden site formation and slope upgrading works.

Name	Type	Completion
Shan Wu House	Non-standard	2019
Tsz Jing House	Non-standard	2019
Bik Yuk House	Non-standard	2019

== On Shing Court ==
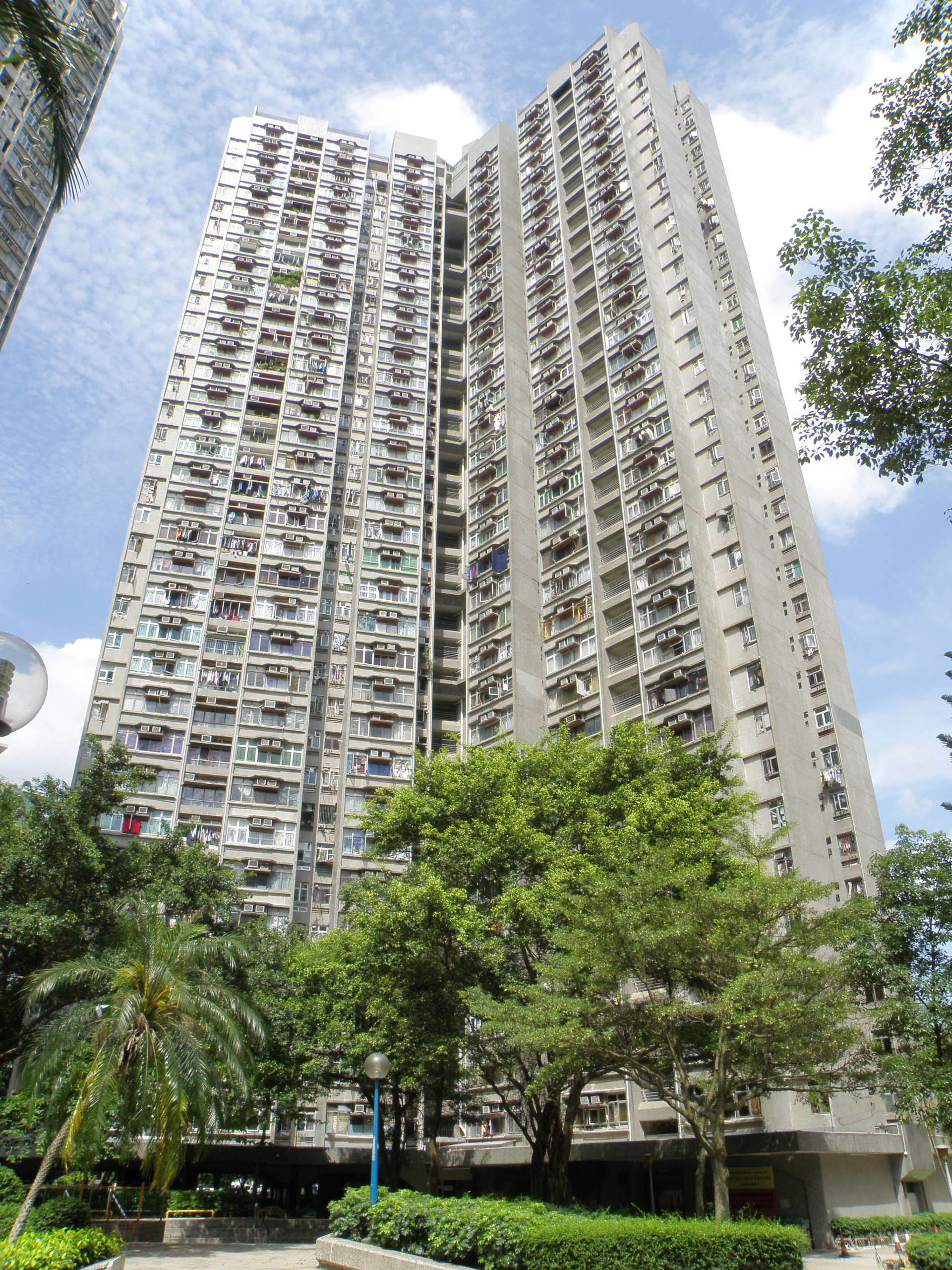
On Shing Court

On Shing Court (Chinese: 安盛苑) is a HOS court in Sheung Shui, near Tin Ping Estate. It had only one block built in 1990.

Name	Type	Completion
On Shing Court	Trident 4	1990

== Sunningdale Garden ==
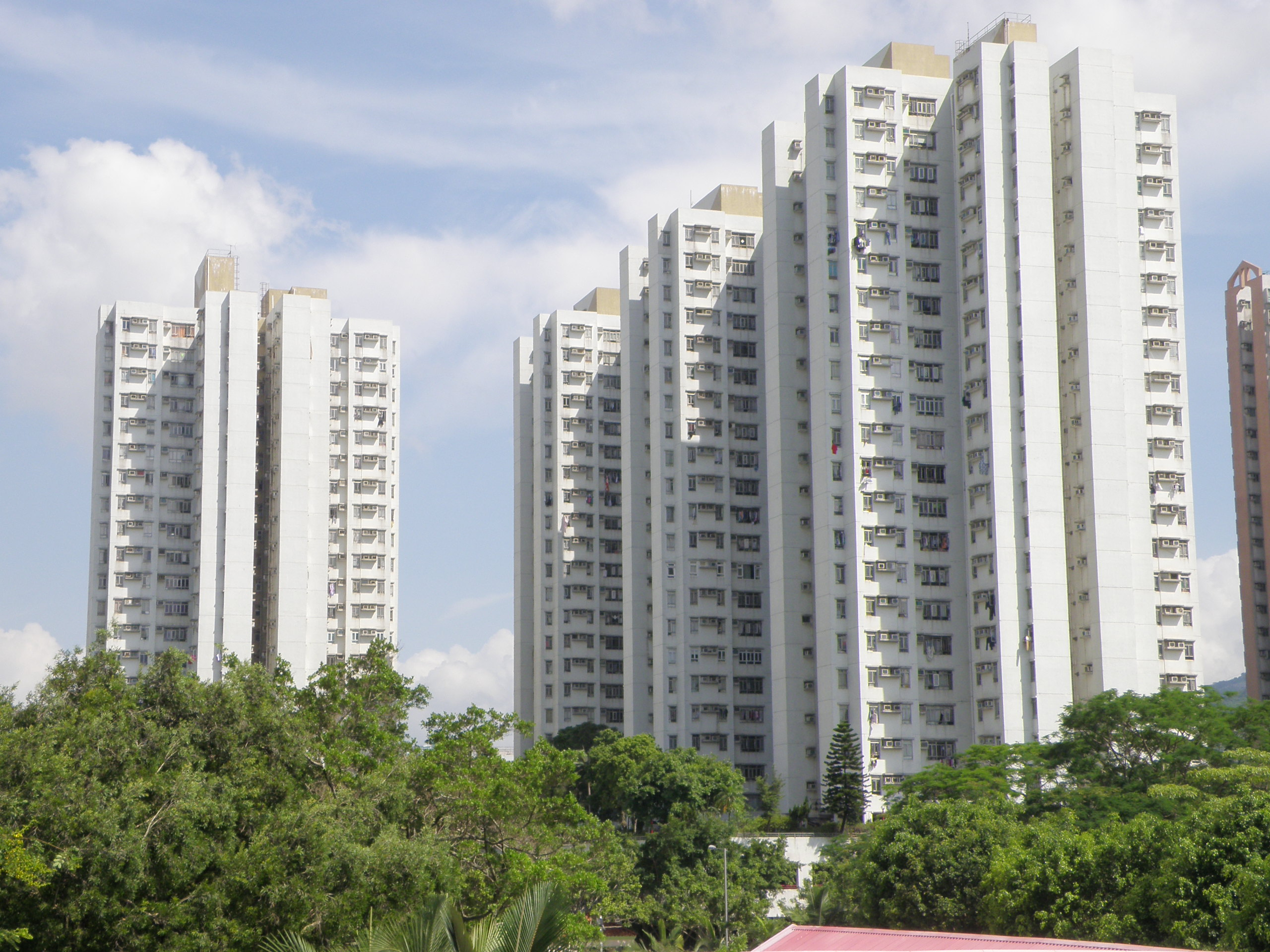
Sunningdale Garden

Sunningdale Garden (Chinese: 順欣花園) is a PSPS housing estate in Sheung Shui Town, near Sheung Shui Town Centre and Shek Wu Hui. It had four blocks built in 1992.

Name	Type	Completion
Block 1	Private Sector Participation Scheme	1992
Block 2	Private Sector Participation Scheme	1992
Block 3	Private Sector Participation Scheme	1992
Block 4	Private Sector Participation Scheme	1992

== Tai Ping Estate ==
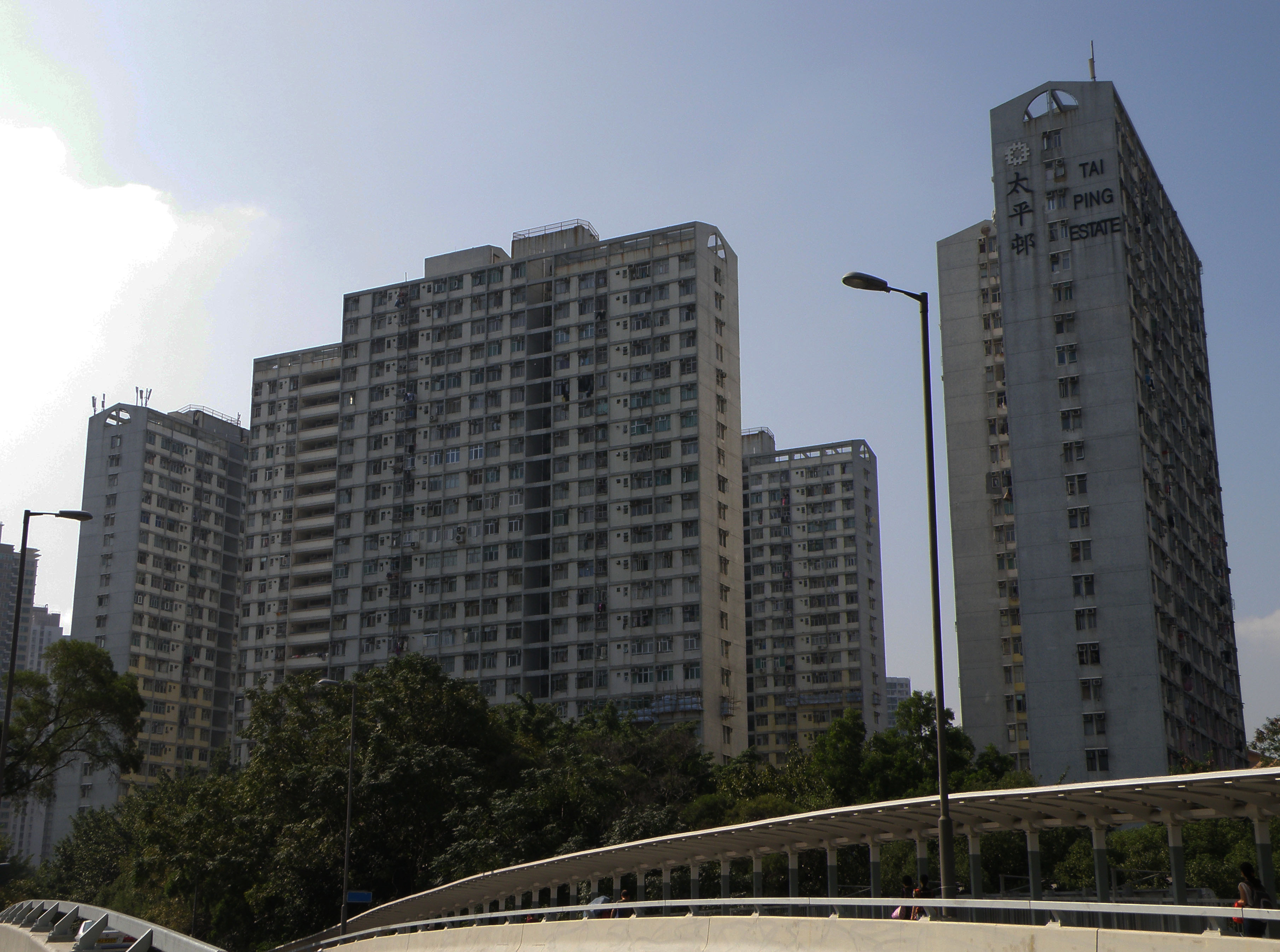
Tai Ping Estate

Tai Ping Estate (Chinese: 太平邨) is a mixed public and TPS housing estate consisting of four residential buildings completed in 1989. Some of the flats were sold to tenants through Tenants Purchase Scheme Phase 5 in 2002.

Name	Type	Completion
Ping Chi House	Linear 1	1989
Ping Ching House	Linear 1	1989
Ping Hay House	Linear 1	1989
Ping Yee House	Linear 1	1989

== Tin Ping Estate ==
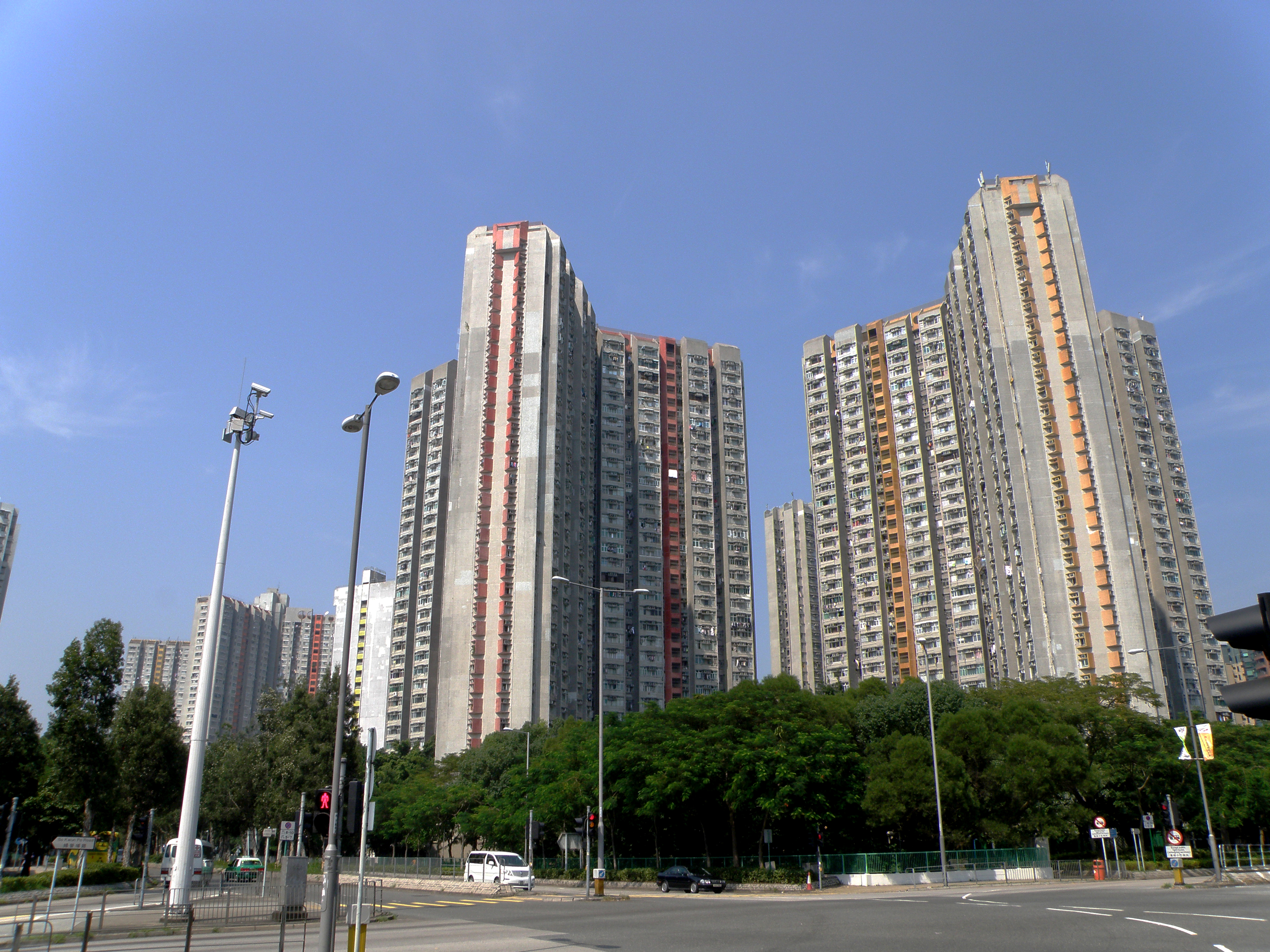
Tin Ping Estate

Tin Ping Estate (Chinese: 天平邨) is the northernmost mixed public and TPS housing estate in Sheung Shui Town. It consists of seven residential buildings completed between 1986 and 1990. Some of the flats were sold to tenants through Tenants Purchase Scheme Phase 3 in 2000.

Name	Type	Completion
Tin Yee House	Trident 2	1986
Tin Cheung House	Trident 2	1986
Tin Hor House	Trident 2	1986
Tin Mei House	Trident 3	1989
Tin Hee House	Trident 3	1989
Tin Long House	Trident 4	1990
Tin Ming House	New Slab	1990

== Tsui Lai Garden ==
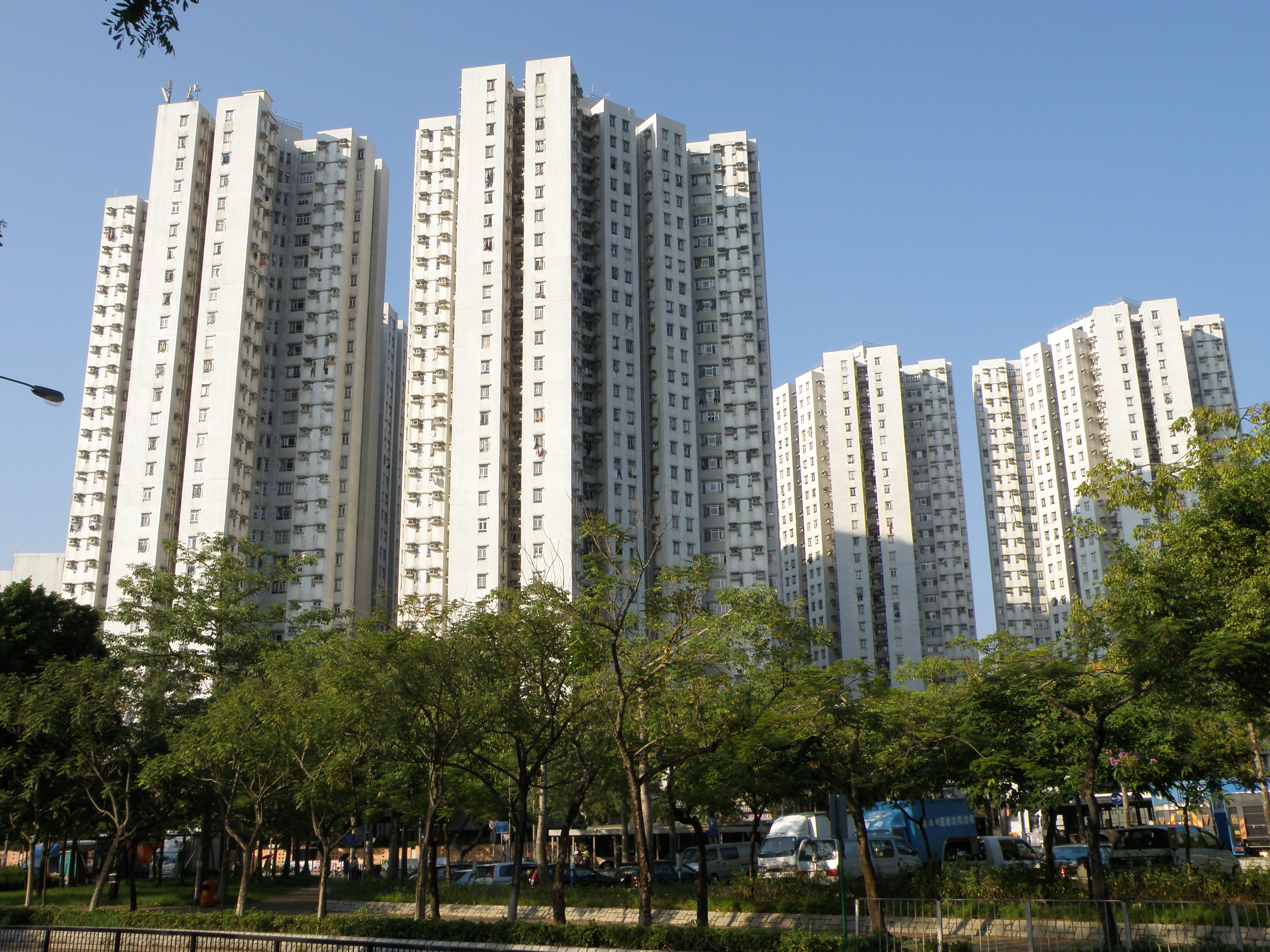
Tsui Lai Garden

Tsui Lai Garden (Chinese: 翠麗花園) is a PSPS housing estate in Sheung Shui Town, near North District Sports Ground. It has six blocks built in 1990.

Name	Type	Completion
Block 1	Private Sector Participation Scheme	1990
Block 2	Private Sector Participation Scheme	1990
Block 3	Private Sector Participation Scheme	1990
Block 4	Private Sector Participation Scheme	1990
Block 5	Private Sector Participation Scheme	1990
Block 6	Private Sector Participation Scheme	1990

== Yuk Po Court ==
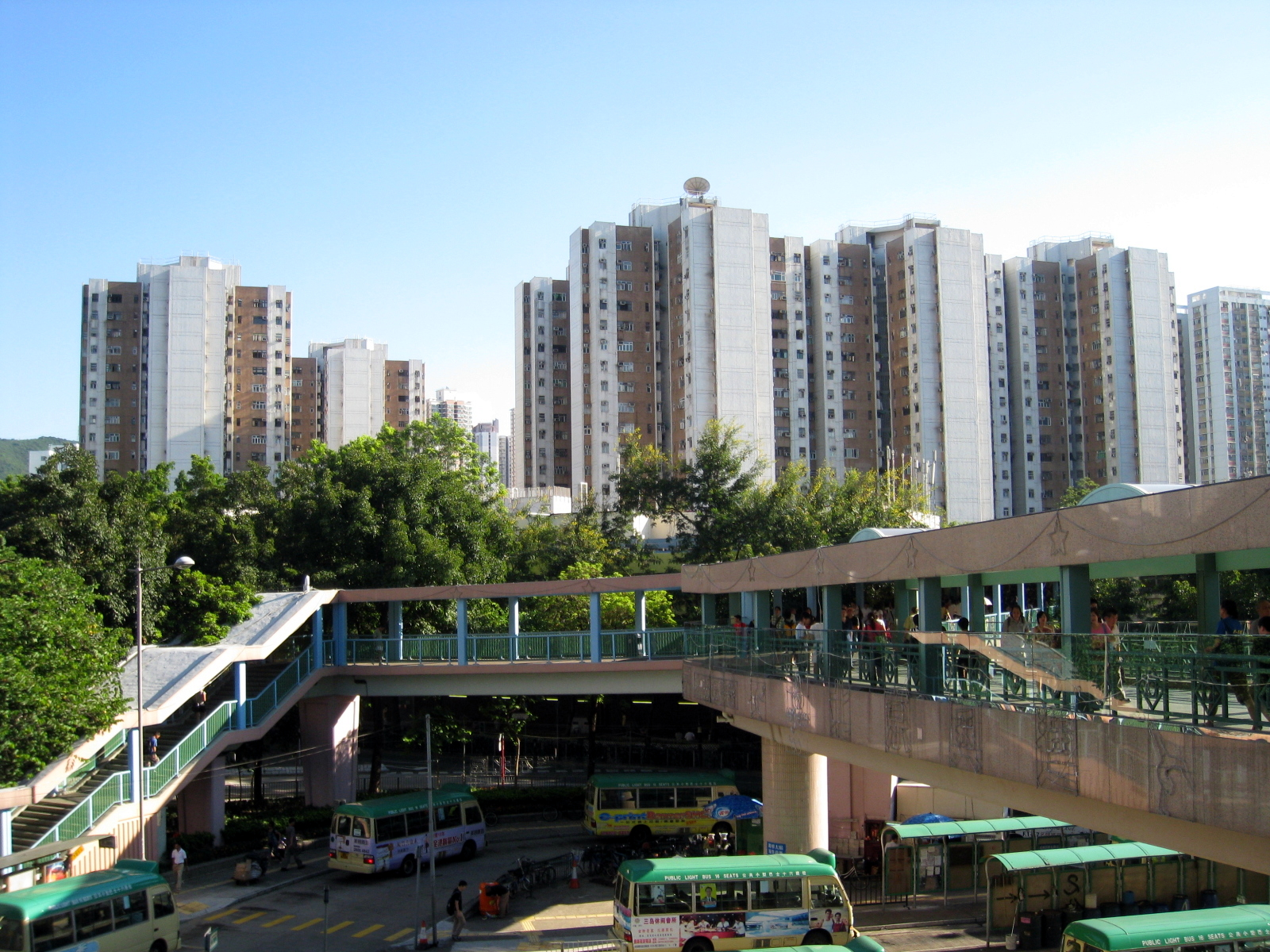
Yuk Po Court

Yuk Po Court (Chinese: 旭埔苑) is an HOS housing estate in Sheung Shui Town, near Choi Yuen Estate and Sheung Shui station. It had eight blocks built in 1982.

Name	Type	Completion
Ching Wu House	Old-Cruciform	1982
Ming Wu House	Old-Cruciform	1982
Tong Wu House	Old-Cruciform	1982
Hon Wu House	Old-Cruciform	1982
Chun Wu House	Old-Cruciform	1982
Chow Wu House	Old-Cruciform	1982
Seung Wu House	Old-Cruciform	1982
Tsun Wu House	Old-Cruciform	1982

== See also ==
- Public housing in Hong Kong
- List of public housing estates in Hong Kong
