= Ng Uk Tsuen =

Ng Uk Tsuen (Chinese: 吳屋村) is the name of three villages in Hong Kong:

- Ng Uk Tsuen, North District, in North District
- Ng Uk Tsuen, Tai Po District, in Tai Po District
- Ng Uk Tsuen, Yuen Long District, in Yuen Long District
