= Hong Kong Housing Authority Exhibition Centre =

Coordinates: 22.3163°N 114.1819°E

- 香港房屋委員會展覽中心
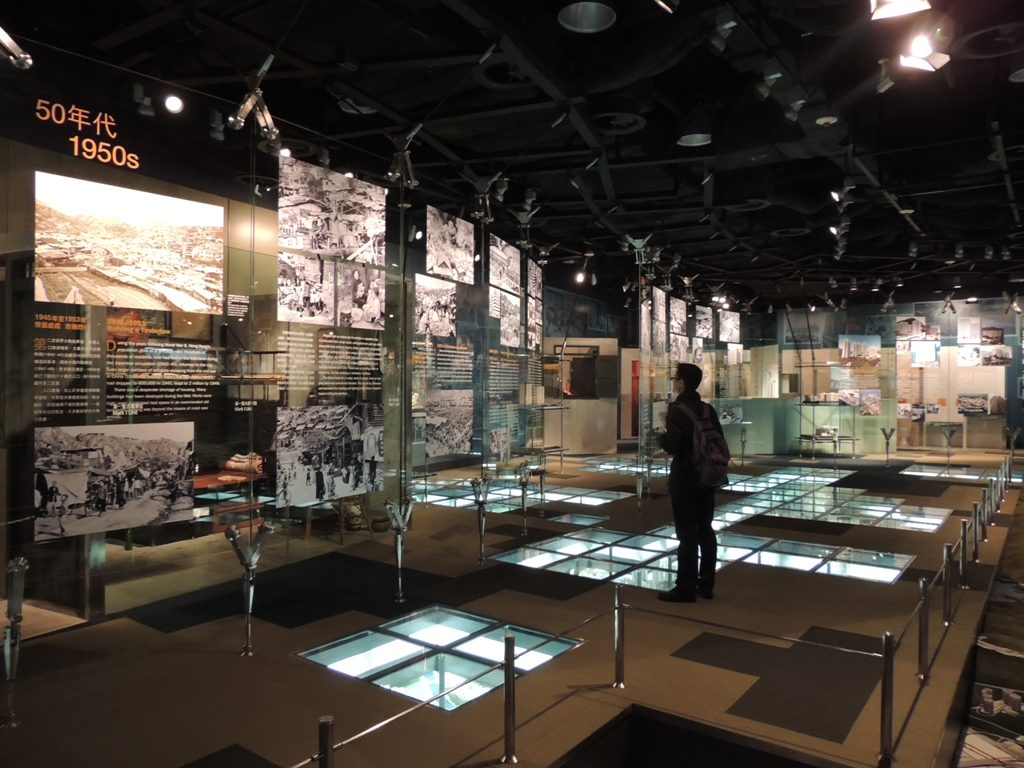
- Housing Authority Exhibition Centre
- Established: July, 2002
- Location: 4/F, Block 3, Hong Kong Housing Authority Headquarters, Ho Man Tin, Hong Kong
- Type: Urban planning museum

The Hong Kong Housing Authority Exhibition Centre (Chinese: 香港房屋委員會展覽中心) is managed by Hong Kong Housing Authority. It is located on the 4/F of Block 3, Hong Kong Housing Authority Headquarters, Ho Man Tin. Permanently closed in March, 2022.

== Exhibition ==
The Opening Ceremony of the centre was held in July, 2002. The history of public housing estates is displayed in a multi-layer display. The first layer displays the role of the Housing Authority in Hong Kong History throughout the decades, in form of photos, scripts and videos. With models, mock-up flats and other exhibits, the second layer displays the physical forms of public housing development. The third layer shows the development of public housing, with side by side the change of the economic and society of Hong Kong in the 50 years.

The highlight of the centre is the diorama showing where all the public housing estates in Hong Kong are located.
