= Tin Ping East (constituency) =

Ting Ping East
- Elected constituency for the North District Council
- Boundary of Ting Ping East in North District
- District: North
- Legislative Council constituency: New Territories North
- Population: 17,073 (2019)
- Electorate: 10,297 (2019)

Current constituency
- Created: 1999
- Number of members: One
- Member: vacant

Tin Ping East is one of the 17 constituencies in the North District, Hong Kong.

The constituency returns one district councillor to the North District Council, with an election every four years. The seat has been currently held by Lau Ki-fung.

Tin Ping East constituency is loosely based on eastern part of the Tin Ping Estate and northwestern areas of Lung Yeuk Tau with estimated population of 17,073.

== Councillors represented ==
Election	Member	Party
1999	Wong Sing-chi	Democratic
2003	Paul Yu Chi-shing	Democratic
2007	Paul Yu Chi-shing	Democratic→Independent
2011	Windy Or Sin-yi	DAB
2015	Lau Ki-fung→Vacant	Democratic→Independent→Neo Democrats
2019	Lau Ki-fung→Vacant	Neo Democrats

== Election results ==
=== 2010s ===
North District Council Election, 2019: Tin Ping East
Party	Candidate	Votes	%	±%
Neo Democrats	Lau Ki-fung	4,513	63.07	+18.77
DAB	Windy Or Sin-yi	2,500	34.94	−5.26
Nonpartisan	Lui Yuk-shan	143	2.00	
Majority		2,013	27.13	
Turnout		7,183	69.79	
Neo Democrats hold		Swing		

North District Council Election, 2015: Tin Ping East
Party	Candidate	Votes	%	±%
Democratic	Lau Ki-fung	1,726	44.3	+11.0
DAB	Windy Or Sin-yi	1,567	40.2	+4.6
Independent	Paul Yu Chi-shing	603	15.5	
Majority		159	4.1	
Turnout		3,968	42.8	
Democratic gain from DAB		Swing		

North District Council Election, 2011: Tin Ping East
Party	Candidate	Votes	%	±%
DAB	Windy Or Sin-yi	1,241	35.6	+13.9
Democratic	Leung Yuk-cheung	1,163	33.3	
Independent	Paul Yu Chi-shing	1,006	28.8	−4.4
Independent	Simon Mok Fu-wah	78	2.2	
DAB gain from Independent		Swing		

=== 2000s ===
North District Council Election, 2007: Tin Ping East
Party	Candidate	Votes	%	±%
Democratic	Paul Yu Chi-shing	813	33.2	−30.8
Independent	Wong Hoi-hung	597	24.3	−11.7
DAB	Windy Or Sin-yi	531	21.7	
Independent	Lin Shui-lin	357	14.6	
Liberal	Ken Nip Ching-keung	154	6.3	
Democratic hold		Swing		

North District Council Election, 2003: Tin Ping East
Party	Candidate	Votes	%	±%
Democratic	Paul Yu Chi-shing	1,538	64.0	+2.2
DAB	Wong Hoi-hung	865	36.0	
Democratic hold		Swing		

=== 1990s ===
North District Council Election, 1999: Tin Ping East
Party	Candidate	Votes	%	±%
Democratic	Wong Sing-chi	1,281	61.8	
Independent	Yong Sheung-ying	608	29.3	
Independent	Yung Ip Siu-mui	167	8.1	
Democratic win (new seat)				
