= Yu Tai (constituency) =

- Elected constituency for the North District Council
- Boundary of Yu Tai in North District
- District: North
- Legislative Council constituency: New Territories North
- Population: 18,967 (2019)
- Electorate: 9,195 (2019)

Current constituency
- Created: 1999
- Number of members: One
- Member: Vincent Chan Chi-fung (Nonpartisan)

Yu Tai (Chinese: 御太), formerly called Choi Yuk Tai, is one of the 18 constituencies in the North District, Hong Kong.

The constituency returns one district councillor to the North District Council, with an election every four years.

Yu Tai constituency has an estimated population of 18,967, loosely covering Cheung Lung Wai Estate, Golf Parkview, Ng Uk Tsuen, Ping Kong, Royal Green, Sheung Shui Disciplined Service Quarters, Sheung Shui Police Married Quarters, Tai Lung, Tai Ping Estate and Venice Garden in Sheung Shui.

== Councillors represented ==
Election	Member	Party
1999	Joseph Chow Kam-siu	Democratic
2007	Larm Wai-leung	DAB
2011	Kent Tsang King-chung	DAB/FTU
2012	Kent Tsang King-chung	FTU
2019	Vincent Chan Chi-fung	Nonpartisan

== Election results ==
=== 2010s ===
North District Council Election, 2019: Yu Tai
Party	Candidate	Votes	%	±%
Nonpartisan	Vincent Chan Chi-fung	3,378	53.12	
FTU	Kent Tsang King-chung	2,981	46.88	
Majority		397	6.24	
Turnout		6,371	69.33	
Nonpartisan gain from FTU		Swing		
