= Po Shek Wu Estate =

Public housing estate in Sheung Shui, Hong Kong

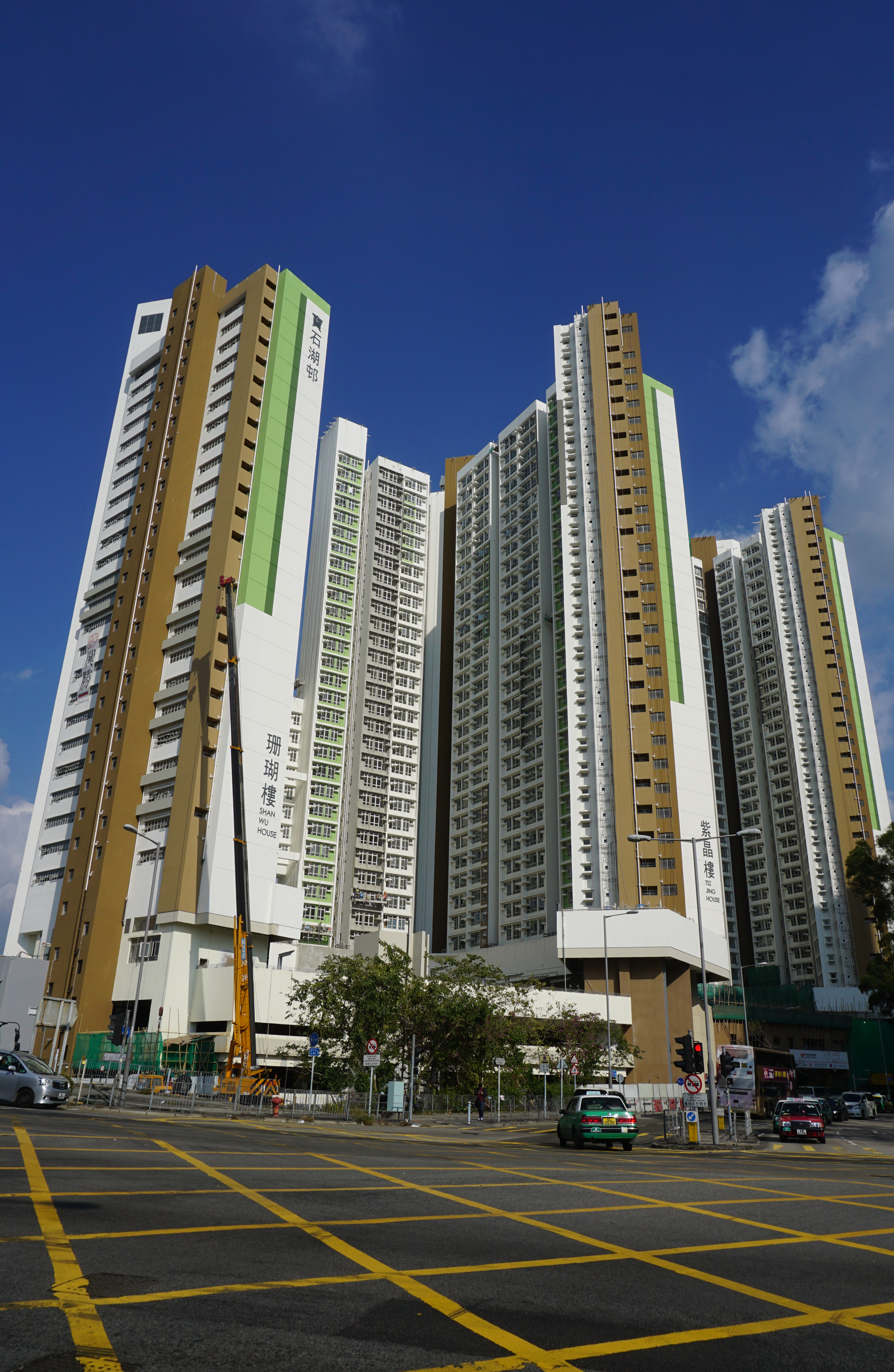
- Po Shek Wu Estate
- Interactive map of Po Shek Wu Estate

General information
- Location: 21 Choi Yuen Road, Sheung Shui; New Territories, Hong Kong
- Coordinates: 22.5035045°N 114.1242247°E
- Status: Completed
- Category: Public rental housing
- No. of blocks: 3
- No. of units: 1,144

Construction
- Constructed: 2019; 7 years ago
- Authority: Hong Kong Housing Authority

Po Shek Wu Estate (Chinese: 寶石湖邨) is a public housing estate located at the junction of Po Shek Wu Road and Choi Yuen Road in Sheung Shui, New Territories, Hong Kong near MTR Sheung Shui station. It comprises three residential blocks of 25, 29 and 33 storeys on a 3-storeyed carpark podium including one semi-basement storey for car park at a total number of 1,144 units completed in 2019. In addition, there is an ancillary facility block including socket-H pile foundation, superstructure and E&M services, one kindergarten, ground floor retail facilities and roof garden site formation and slope upgrading works.

== Houses ==
Name	Chinese name	Building type	Completed
Shan Wu House	珊瑚樓	Non-standard	2019
Tsz Jing House	紫晶樓	Non-standard	2019
Bik Yuk House	碧玉樓	Non-standard	2019

== Politics ==
Po Shek Wu Estate is located in Shek Wu Hui constituency of the North District Council. It was formerly represented by Lam Cheuk-ting, who was elected in the 2019 elections until March 2021.

== See also ==
- Public housing estates in Sheung Shui
