= Tai Ping Estate =

Public housing estate in Sheung Shui, Hong Kong

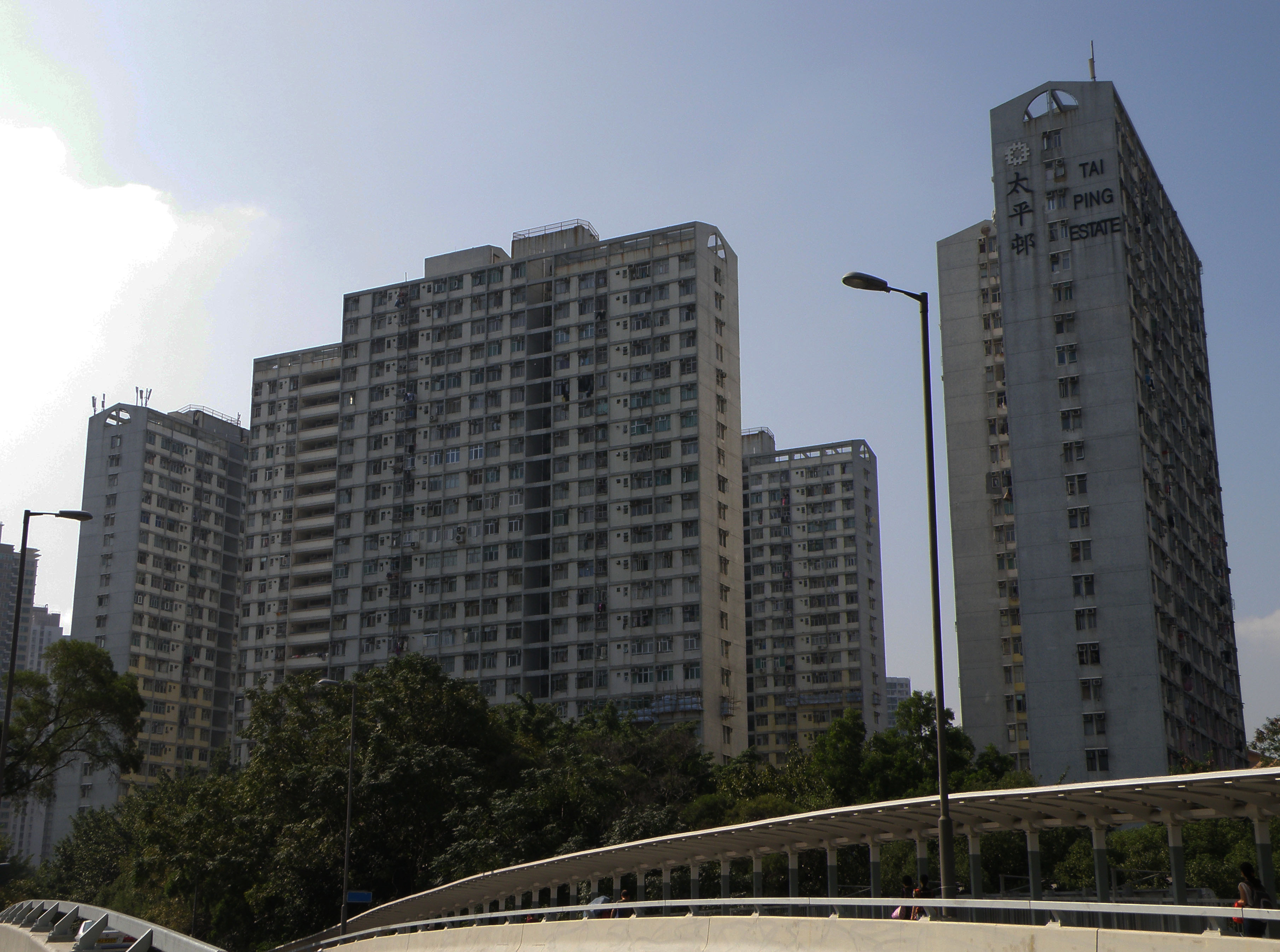
- Tai Ping Estate
- Interactive map of Tai Ping Estate

General information
- Location: 8 Po Ping Road, Sheung Shui; New Territories, Hong Kong
- Coordinates: 22.49778°N 114.12644°E
- Status: Completed
- Category: Public rental housing
- Population: 4,438 (2016)
- No. of blocks: 4
- No. of units: 424

Construction
- Constructed: 1989; 37 years ago
- Authority: Hong Kong Housing Authority

Tai Ping Estate (Chinese: 太平邨) is a public housing estate in Sheung Shui, New Territories, Hong Kong. It consists of four residential buildings completed in 1989. Some of the flats were sold to tenants through Tenants Purchase Scheme Phase 5 in 2002.

== Houses ==
Name	Chinese name	Building type	Completed
Ping Chi House	平治樓	Linear 1	1989
Ping Ching House	平靜樓	Linear 1	1989
Ping Hay House	平熙樓	Linear 1	1989
Ping Yee House	平易樓	Linear 1	1989

== Demographics ==
According to the 2016 by-census, Tai Ping Estate had a population of 4,438. The median age was 42.2 and the majority of residents (97.3 per cent) were of Chinese ethnicity. The average household size was 3.3 people. The median monthly household income of all households (i.e. including both economically active and inactive households) was HK$28,800.

== Politics ==
Tai Ping Estate is located in Yu Tai constituency of the North District Council. It is currently represented by Vincent Chan Chi-fung, who was elected in the 2019 elections.

== See also ==
- Public housing estates in Sheung Shui
