= Ching Ho Estate =

Public housing estate in Sheung Shui, Hong Kong

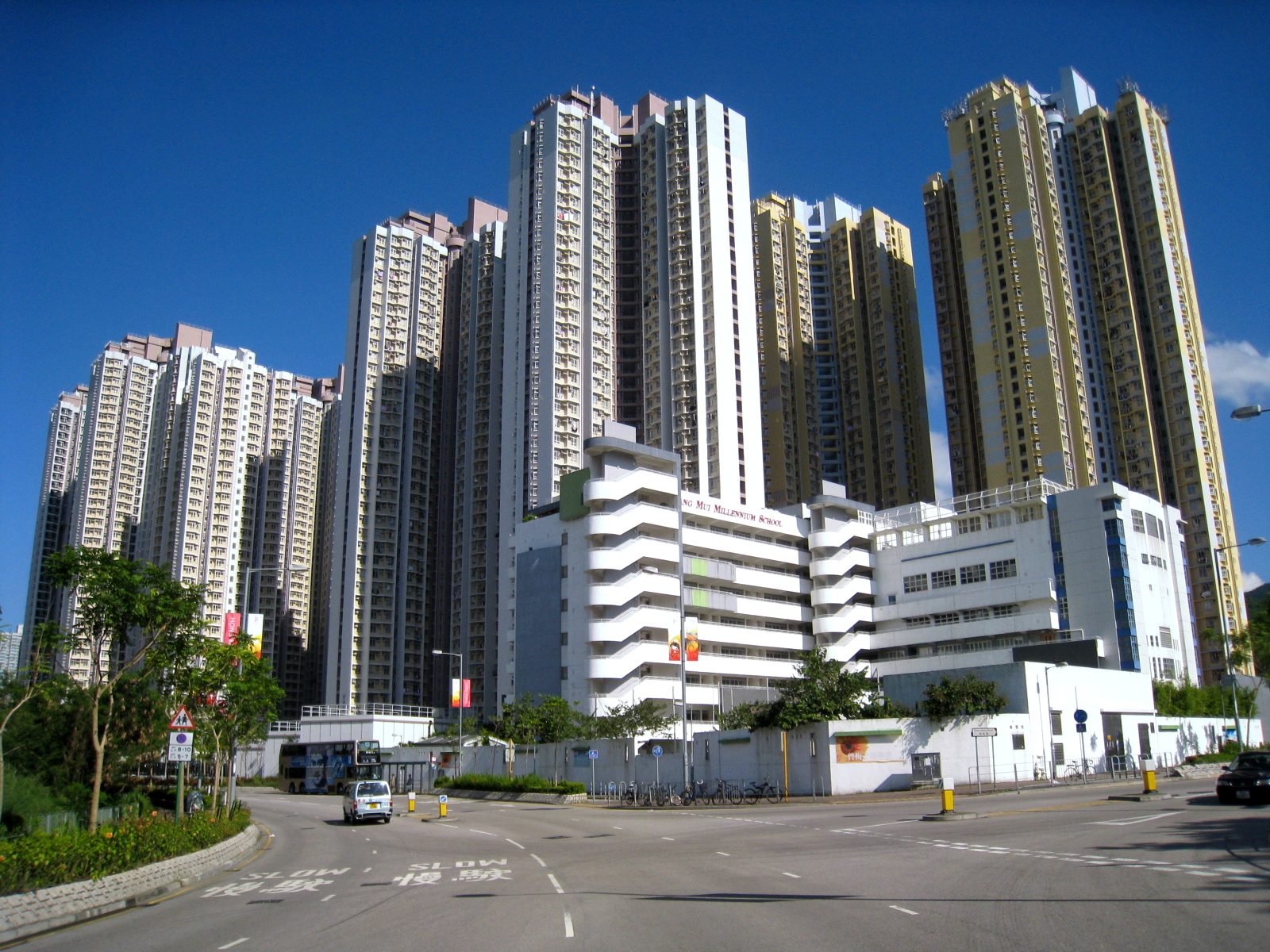
- Ching Ho Estate
- Interactive map of Ching Ho Estate

General information
- Location: 5 Ching Hiu Road, Sheung Shui; New Territories, Hong Kong
- Coordinates: 22.49311°N 114.12577°E
- Status: Completed
- Category: Public rental housing
- Population: 20,257 (2016)
- No. of blocks: 8
- No. of units: 7,200

Construction
- Constructed: 2007; 19 years ago
- Authority: Hong Kong Housing Authority

Ching Ho Estate (Chinese: 清河邨) is a public housing estate located in Sheung Shui, New Territories, Hong Kong near Elegantia College, Tsang Mui Millennium School and Tung Wah Group of Hospitals Ma Kam Chan Memorial Primary School (Main Campus). The estate is developed into three phases, with a total of 8 "New Harmony" residential buildings and a shopping centre. Phase 3 consists of three blocks completed in 2007 while Phases 1 and 2 consist of a total of five blocks and a shopping centre completed in 2008.

== Houses ==
| Name | Chinese name | Building type | Completed |
|---|---|---|---|
| Ching Chak House | 清澤樓 | New Harmony 1 | 2007 |
| Ching Long House | 清朗樓 | New Harmony 1 | 2007 |
| Ching Chiu House | 清照樓 | New Harmony 1 | 2007 |
| Ching Chung House | 清頌樓 | New Harmony 1 | 2008 |
| Ching Ping House | 清平樓 | New Harmony 1 | 2008 |
| Ching Yun House | 清潤樓 | New Harmony 1 | 2008 |
| Ching Yu House | 清譽樓 | New Harmony 1 with New Harmony Annex 5 | 2008 |
| Ching Hin House | 清顯樓 | New Harmony 1 with New Harmony Annex 5 | 2008 |

== Demographics ==
According to the 2016 by-census, Ching Ho Estate had a population of 20,257. The median age was 39.4 and the majority of residents (99.3 per cent) were of Chinese ethnicity. The average household size was 2.9 people. The median monthly household income of all households (i.e. including both economically active and inactive households) was HK$17,500.

== Politics ==
Ching Ho Estate is located in Ching Ho constituency of the North District Council. It was formerly represented by Yuen Ho-lun, who was elected in the 2019 elections until May 2021.

== COVID-19 pandemic ==
Ching Long House in Ching Ho Estate was placed under lockdown for mandatory tests between 15 and 17 February 2022, with at least 48 preliminary positive cases uncovered.

== See also ==
- Public housing estates in Sheung Shui
