= Cheung Lung Wai Estate =

Public housing estate in Sheung Shui, Hong Kong

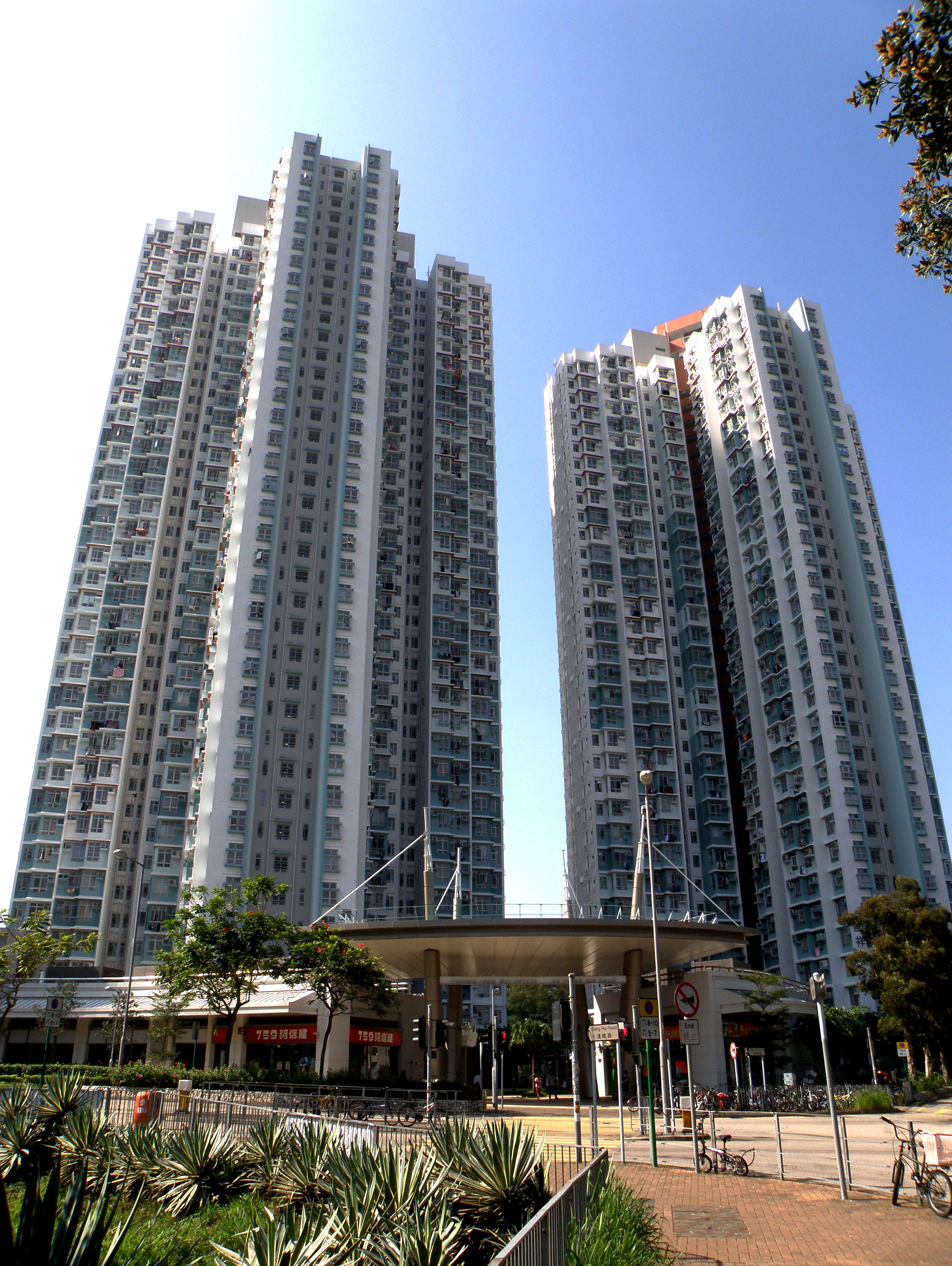
- Cheung Lung Wai Estate
- Interactive map of Cheung Lung Wai Estate

General information
- Location: 21 Ching Hiu Road, Sheung Shui; New Territories, Hong Kong
- Coordinates: 22.49495°N 114.12369°E
- Status: Completed
- Category: Public rental housing
- Population: 3,765 (2016)
- No. of blocks: 2
- No. of units: 1,358

Construction
- Constructed: 2015; 11 years ago
- Authority: Hong Kong Housing Authority

Cheung Lung Wai Estate (Chinese: 祥龍圍邨) is a public housing estate in Sheung Shui, New Territories, Hong Kong near North District Hospital. It comprises two residential blocks providing 1,358 units completed in 2015.

== Houses ==
Name	Chinese name	Building type	Completed
Ching Cheung House	呈祥樓	Non-standard (Cruciform)	2015
King Cheung House	景祥樓	Non-standard (Cruciform)	2015

== Demographics ==
According to the 2016 by-census, Cheung Lung Wai Estate had a population of 3,765. The median age was 36.9 and the majority of residents (99.5 per cent) were of Chinese ethnicity. The average household size was 2.8 people. The median monthly household income of all households (i.e. including both economically active and inactive households) was HK$16,000.

== Politics ==
Cheung Lung Wai Estate is located in Yu Tai constituency of the North District Council. It was formerly represented by Vincent Chan Chi-fung, who was elected in the 2019 elections until July 2021.

== See also ==
- Public housing estates in Sheung Shui
- Ping Kong, a nearby walled village that was named 'Cheung Lung Wai' (祥龍圍) in the past
