= Yuen Long Estate =

Public housing estate in Hong Kong

Coordinates: 22.4474°N 114.0246°E

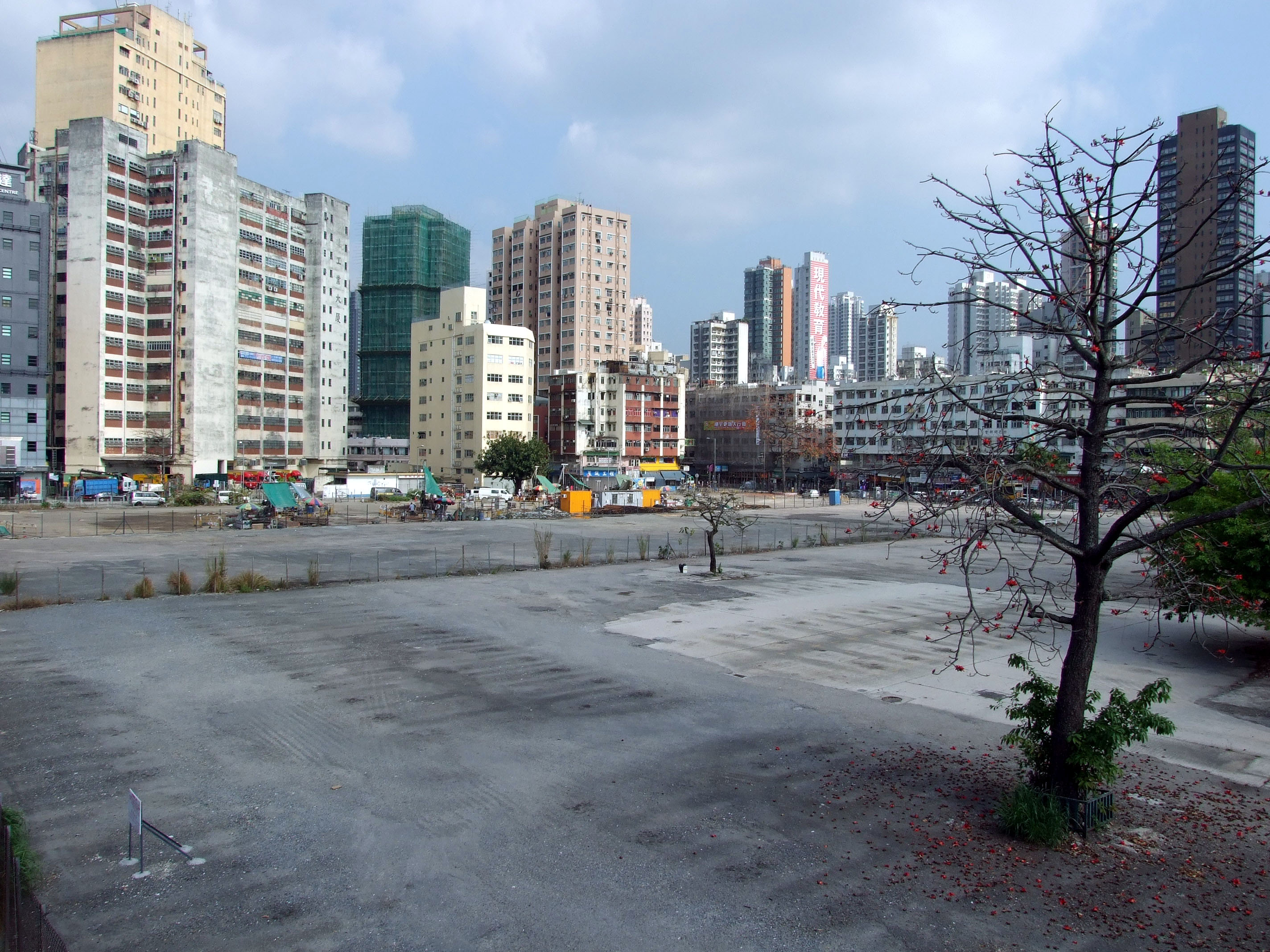
Site of the former Yuen Long Estate

Yuen Long Estate (Chinese: 元朗邨) was a public housing estate in Yuen Long Town, Yuen Long, New Territories, Hong Kong, located to the east of Long Ping station on the MTR. It was the first public housing estate in Yuen Long. The estate had five residential blocks built in 1968 that were demolished in 2001. The site was then turned into an outdoor car park. The site has been rebuilt as two parts—Long Ching Estate, a public housing estate, and Yuccie Square, a private housing estate.
