= Long Ching Estate =

Public housing estate in Yuen Long, Hong Kong

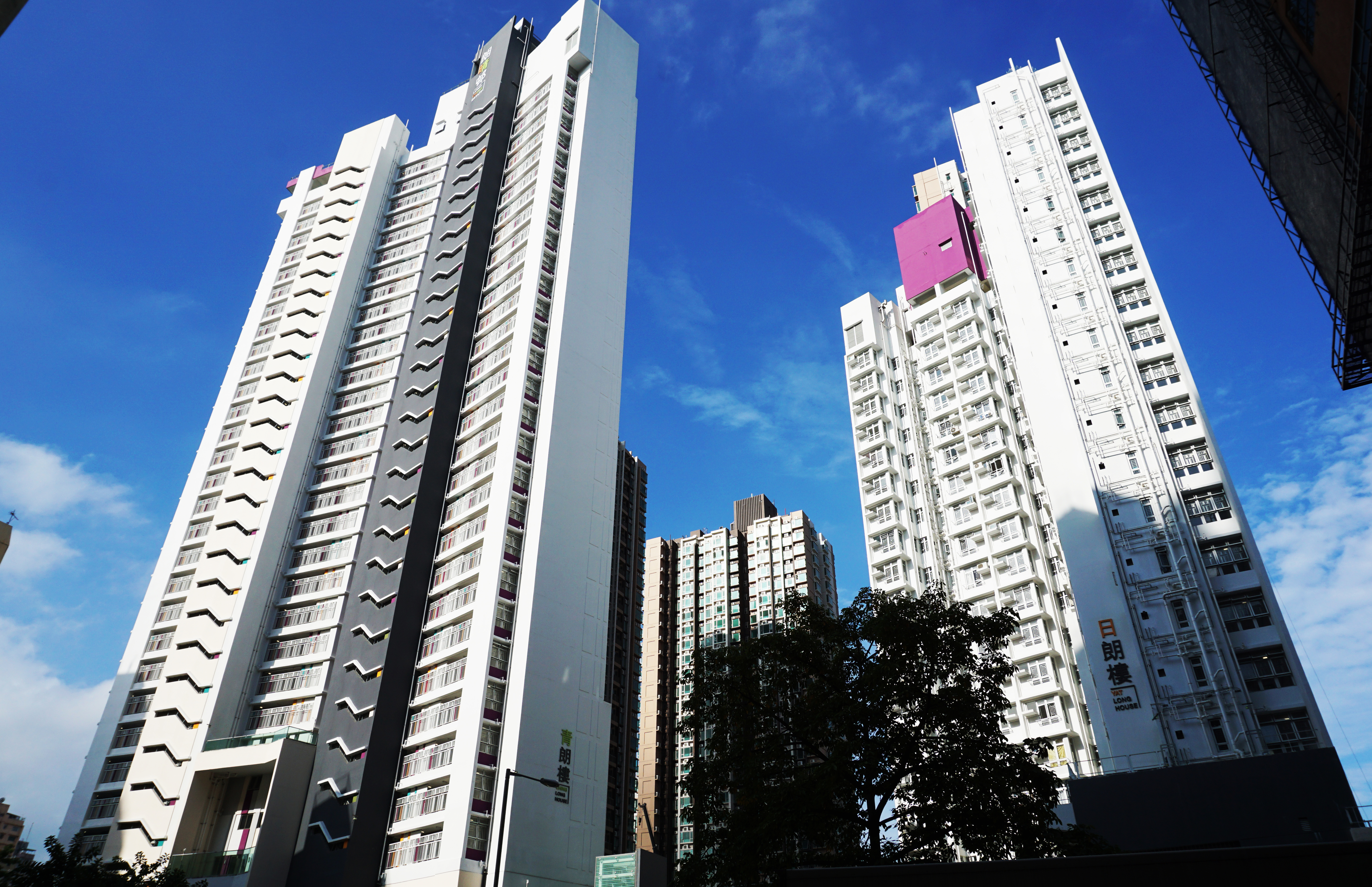
- Long Ching Estate
- Interactive map of Long Ching Estate

General information
- Location: 9 Wang Chau Road, Yuen Long; New Territories, Hong Kong
- Coordinates: 22.44667°N 114.02871°E
- Status: Completed
- Category: Public rental housing
- No. of blocks: 2
- No. of units: 438

Construction
- Constructed: 2016; 10 years ago
- Authority: Hong Kong Housing Authority

Long Ching Estate (Chinese: 朗晴邨) is a public housing estate in Yuen Long, New Territories, Hong Kong, near Tai Kiu Tsuen and within walking distance to MTR Long Ping station. It consists of two residential blocks completed in 2016.

== History ==
Long Ching Estate was formerly the site of Yuen Long Estate, which had five buildings and was demolished in 2001. Originally, the Housing Authority planned to build three 32-storey blocks on the land. However, the Yuen Long District Council believed the land should be privately developed to boost the local economy. The government eventually divided the land in two, offering part of the site for private development of Yuccie Square.

== Houses ==
Name	Chinese name	Building type	Completed
Yat Long House	日朗樓	Non-standard	2016
Ching Long House	青朗樓	Non-standard	2016

== Politics ==
Long Ching Estate is located in Yuen Long Tung Tau constituency of the Yuen Long District Council. It was formerly represented by Lam Ting-wai, who was elected in the 2019 elections until July 2021.

== See also ==
- Public housing estates in Yuen Long
