= Shek Wu Hui (constituency) =

- Elected constituency for the North District Council
- Boundary of Shek Wu Hui in North District
- District: North
- Legislative Council constituency: New Territories North
- Population: 19,841 (2019)
- Electorate: 10,071 (2019)

Current constituency
- Created: 1982
- Number of members: One
- Member(s): Vacant

Shek Wu Hui is one of the 18 constituencies in the North District, Hong Kong.

The constituency returns one district councillor to the North District Council, with an election every four years. The seat was last held by Lam Cheuk-ting of the Democratic Party. It has been vacant since Lam's resignation.

Shek Wu Hui constituency is loosely based on Shek Wu Hui including Sheung Shui Centre, Sheung Shui Town Centre, Sunningdale Garden, Metropolis Plaza and Lung Fung Garden in Sheung Shui with estimated population of 19,841.

== Councillors represented ==
=== 1982 to 1985 ===
Election	Member	Party
1982	Lau Sum-por	Independent

=== 1985 to 1988 ===
Election	Member	Party	Member	Party
1985	Cheung Kan-kwai	Independent	Cheung Ying	Independent

=== 1988 to present ===
Election	Member	Party
1988	Cheung Kan-kwai	Independent
1991	Chong Kam-ning	Independent
1994	Wong Chi-wah	DAB
1999	Chan Hing-fuk	Democratic
1999	Chan Hing-fuk	Democratic
2007	Wong Sing-chi	Democratic
2011	Simon Wong Yun-keung	DAB
2015	Lam Cheuk-ting	Democratic
2019	Lam Cheuk-ting→Vacant (Note: Resigned on 30 March 2021 after being arrested under national security law.)	Democratic

== Election results ==
=== 2010s ===
North District Council Election, 2019: Shek Wu Hui
Party	Candidate	Votes	%	±%
Democratic	Lam Cheuk-ting	3,926	55.46	−0.94
NPP (Civil Force)	Howard Hung Wing-yip	2,684	37.91	
Nonpartisan	Clarence Ronald Leung Kam-shing	469	6.63	
Majority		1,242	17.55	
Turnout		7,103	70.55	
Democratic hold		Swing		

North District Council Election, 2015: Shek Wu Hui
Party	Candidate	Votes	%	±%
Democratic	Lam Cheuk-ting	2,390	56.4	+24.0
DAB	Simon Wong Yun-keung	1,760	41.5	–0.4
Nonpartisan	Lau Hon-kin	90	2.1	
Majority		630	14.9	
Turnout		4,302	46.0	
Democratic gain from DAB		Swing	+12.2	

North District Council Election, 2011: Shek Wu Hui
Party	Candidate	Votes	%	±%
DAB	Simon Wong Yun-keung	1,564	41.9	+8.7
Democratic	Joseph Chow Kam-siu	1,210	32.4	−14.7
Liberal	Alvan Hau Wing-kong	506	13.6	
People Power (Frontier)	Cheung Suk-man	453	12.1	
DAB gain from Democratic		Swing		

=== 2000s ===
North District Council Election, 2007: Shek Wu Hui
Party	Candidate	Votes	%	±%
Democratic	Nelson Wong Sing-chi	1,534	47.1	−10.3
DAB	Simon Wong Yun-keung	1,081	33.2	
Independent	Liu Kam-cheong	525	16.1	
Independent	Wong Luen-fat	115	3.5	
Democratic hold		Swing		

North District Council Election, 2003: Shek Wu Hui
Party	Candidate	Votes	%	±%
Democratic	Chan Hing-fuk	1,361	57.4	+6.0
Liberal	Jackie Cheung Yuk-shu	704	29.7	
Independent	Stephen Wong Luen-fat	307	12.9	
Democratic hold		Swing		

=== 1990s ===
North District Council Election, 1999: Shek Wu Hui
Party	Candidate	Votes	%	±%
Democratic	Chan Hing-fuk	1,006	51.4	
DAB	Wong Chi-wah	933	47.7	−2.8
Democratic gain from DAB		Swing		

North District Board Election, 1994: Shek Wu Hui
Party	Candidate	Votes	%	±%
DAB	Wong Chi-wah	1,463	50.5	
Independent	Chan Hon-lam	1,387	47.9	
DAB gain from Independent		Swing		

North District Board Election, 1991: Shek Wu Hui
Party	Candidate	Votes	%	±%
Independent	Chong Kam-ning	705	64.3	
LDF	Lawrence Tse Lap-fu	384	35.0	
Independent gain from Independent		Swing		

=== 1980s ===
North District Board Election, 1988: Shek Wu Hui
Party	Candidate	Votes	%	±%
Independent	Cheung Kan-kwai	Unopposed		
Independent gain from Independent		Swing		

North District Board Election, 1985: Shek Wu Hui
Party	Candidate	Votes	%	±%
Independent	Cheung Kan-kwai	2,238	49.0	
Independent	Cheung Ying	2,129	46.6	
Independent	Ip Yi-man	1,690	37.0	
Independent	Tang Hin-kwong	1,603	35.1	
Independent	Wong Kwok-fai	481	10.5	
Independent gain from Independent		Swing		
Independent win (new seat)				

North District Board Election, 1982: Shek Wu Hui
Party	Candidate	Votes	%	±%
Independent	Lau Sum-por	1,259	51.2	
Independent	Liu Sun-yip	1,124	45.4	
Independent	Cheung Kwai-woon	56	2.3	
Independent win (new seat)				
