= Ng Uk Tsuen, North District =

Village in Sheung Shui, Hong Kong

Coordinates: 22.496493°N 114.127366°E

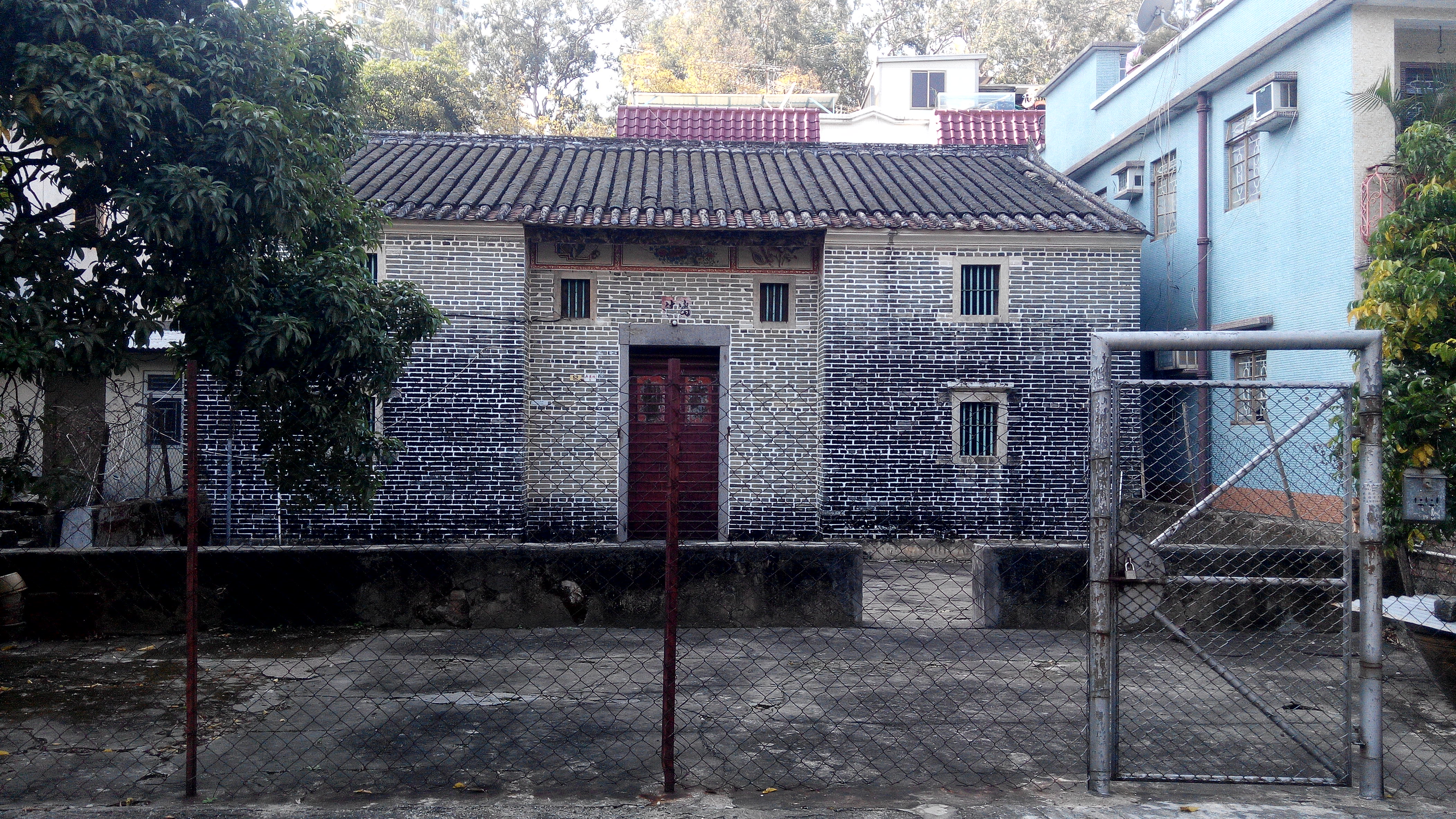
No. 5 Ng Uk Tsuen.

Ng Uk Tsuen (Chinese: 吳屋村) is a village in Sheung Shui, North District, Hong Kong.

== Administration ==
Ng Uk Tsuen is a recognized village under the New Territories Small House Policy.

== See also ==
- Yu Tai (constituency)
