= Shek Wu Hui =

Shek Wu Hui 石湖墟
- neighbourhood, former market town
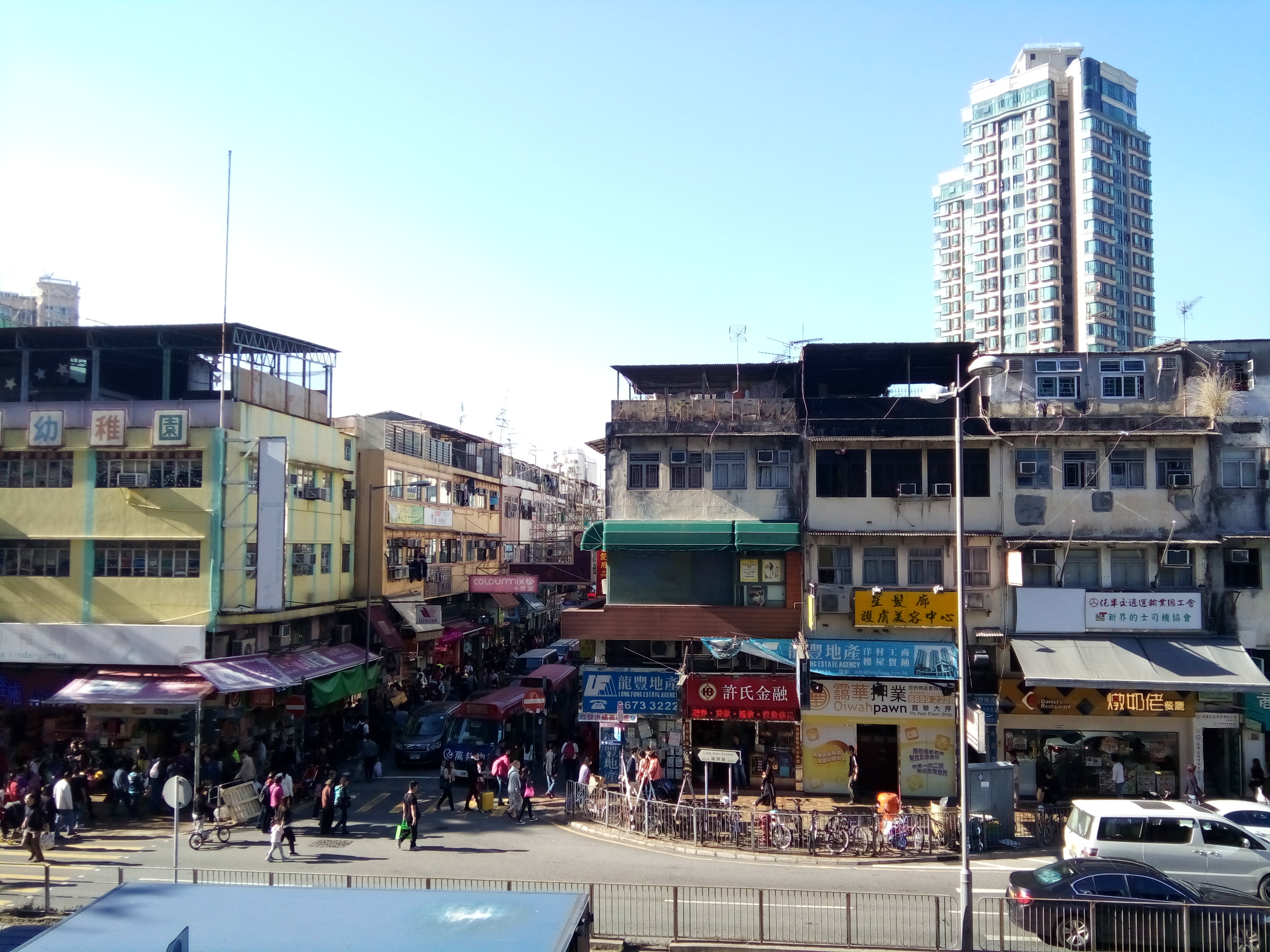
- Lung Sum Avenue in Shek Wu Hui.
- Etymology: name after a place "Shek Wu" (stone-lake)
- Location of Shek Wu Hui within Hong Kong
- Coordinates: 22.505267°N 114.12707°E
- Country: China
- Provincial-level SARs: Hong Kong
- Regions: The New Territories
- District: North District
- Founded: before 1819
- Became part of Hong Kong: 1898
- Hong Kong returned to China: 1997
- Founder: Liu clan of Sheung Shui Wai
- Time zone: UTC+8 (Hong Kong Time)

Shek Wu Hui
- Chinese: 石湖墟
- Jyutping: sek6 wu4 heoi1
- Cantonese Yale: sehk wùh hēui
- Hanyu Pinyin: Shí hú xū
Transcriptions
Standard Mandarin
- Hanyu Pinyin: Shí hú xū
Yue: Cantonese
- Yale Romanization: sehk wùh hēui
- Jyutping: sek6 wu4 heoi1

Shek Wu Hui (Chinese: 石湖墟) is a non-administrative subdivision (neighbourhood) and former indigenous market town located in Sheung Shui in the North District of Hong Kong. The place name can be found in the record that published in 1819.

== Administration ==
For electoral purposes, Shek Wu Hui is part of the Shek Wu Hui constituency of the North District Council. It was formerly represented by Lam Cheuk-ting, who was elected in the local elections until March 2021.

== History ==
The name Shek Wu Hui appeared in Qing dynasty Jiaqing Year's Xin'an Xianzhi (Gazetteer of the Xin'an County), with footnote: "舊誌天崗，今移石湖", literally means the market town was relocated from another place Tin Gong (Chinese: 天崗; Jyutping: tin1 gong1; Cantonese Yale: tīn gōng) to Shek Wu (Chinese: 石湖; Jyutping: sek6 wu4; Cantonese Yale: sehk wùh; lit. 'stone lake') between the two editions of Xin'an Xianzhi. The older edition of Xin'an Xianzhi was published in Kangxi Year, or circa 1688 in the Gregorian calendar. According to an academic paper, Shek Wu Hui was established by one of the Five Great Clans of the New Territories, Liu clan (surnamed Liu (廖), in modern-day standard Mandarin Chinese: Liào), while Tin Gong was established by another Five Great Clans: Hau clan (surnamed Hau (侯), in modern-day standard Mandarin Chinese: Hou).

At the time of the 1911 census, the population of Shek Wu Hui was 56. The number of males was 37.

In 1972, Shek Wu Hui the indigenous market town, combined with modern market centre Luen Wo Hui and indigenous villages in Fanling (Fan Leng Tai Wai, Fan Leng Nam Wai and Fanling Pak Wai) and Sheung Shui (Sheung Shui Wai), was selected as one of the three construction sites for satellite towns (new towns). The two other market towns were Tai Po and Yuen Long. The new town, Fanling - Sheung Shui - Shek Wu Hui, was later known as just Fanling–Sheung Shui New Town.

The villages of Fanling, in the past belonged to Tai Po Tsat Yeuk, an inter-village alliance. The alliance founded Tai Wo Shi circa 1892, which later known as [new] Tai Po Hui (Tai Po Market) and the old Tai Po Hui became Tai Po Old Market instead. The owner of Tai Po Old Market, Tang clan, another Five Great Clans, also involved in the founding of Luen Wo Hui in 1951, a relative more modern market centre between Shek Wu Hui and Tai Po Hui, and was located in Fanling.

In the past, the market town did not open every day. It was reported that Shek Wu Hui was opened in the 1st, 4th, 7th, 11th, 14th, 17th, 21st, 24th, 27th day of the month in the Chinese lunar calendar, and was the same as Luen Wo Hui according to some source. The two markets are close together. The arrangement made people from other villages, have to choose either Shek Wu Hui or Luen Wo Hui. According to another source, villagers from Lin Ma Hang, which co-founded the market town in Sha Tau Kok (the location also shown in the 1898 map) in the 1820s to the 1830s, also went to Shek Wu Hui, Luen Wo Hui and Shenzhen. Lin Ma Hang was part of the 10 "Yeuk" of Sha Tau Kok, and each Yeuk itself consists of one or more villages. However, in that source it claimed Shek Wu Hui (1st, 4th, 7th sequence) had a different opening days with Luen Wo Hui, Shenzhen (both 2nd, 5th, 8th sequence), as well as Sha Tau Kok (3rd, 6th, 9th sequence). On top of the confusion, another book claimed the opening days of Shek Wu Hui and Sha Tau Kok were the same (1st, 4th, 7th sequence). Nevertheless, due to the colonial Hong Kong government closed the border after the establishment of the People's Republic of China as well as influx of economic and political refugees from the north, villagers from Lin Ma Hang were unable to access Shenzhen, while Sha Tau Kok lost half of its hinterland, making Shek Wu Hui became a more favourable choice. It was reported that villagers from Lin Ma Han, also contributed in the foundation of Luen Wo Hui.

=== In modern day ===
Shek Wu Hui in modern-day are composed of post-Qing dynasty buildings. A street of the neighbourhood, Tsun Fu Street (Chinese: 巡撫街), was a memorial of early Qing officials that submitted a request on behalf with villagers. Qing Empire had forbidden people to live near to the coast since 1661, due to Taiwan was not yet conquered until 1683, and such "sea-ban" (Chinese: 海禁) was to cut-off the connection between villages that under Qing Empire and the Southern Ming and the Kingdom of Tungning. The villagers seek to abolish such rule for years. The request was accepted by the emperor and villagers were allowed to return to their native place. Tsun Fu Street, was the location of a temple in memorial of the officials. However, the temple, along with the market town, was destroyed by fire. The area and the market were rebuilt, but not the temple.

Due to the establishment of Fanling–Sheung Shui New Town, new shopping malls were built in other places in Sheung Shui to compete with Shek Wu Hui. In the 1990s, the wet market was relocated to Shek Wu Hui Complex Building. The building itself was located within Sheung Shui, but not within Shek Wu Hui.

In recent years, Shek Wu Hui was criticized as one of the cross-border shopping centre for the Mainland China tourists, which also accused as one of the black spot of smuggling, as the tourists and smuggler bought goods in Shek Wu Hui and transported those goods back to the mainland as hand carry luggage, via East Rail line. Shek Wu Hui is served by Sheung Shui station, which is the second last stop of the former Kowloon–Canton Railway (British section).
