= Tin Ping Estate =

Public housing estate in Sheung Shui, Hong Kong

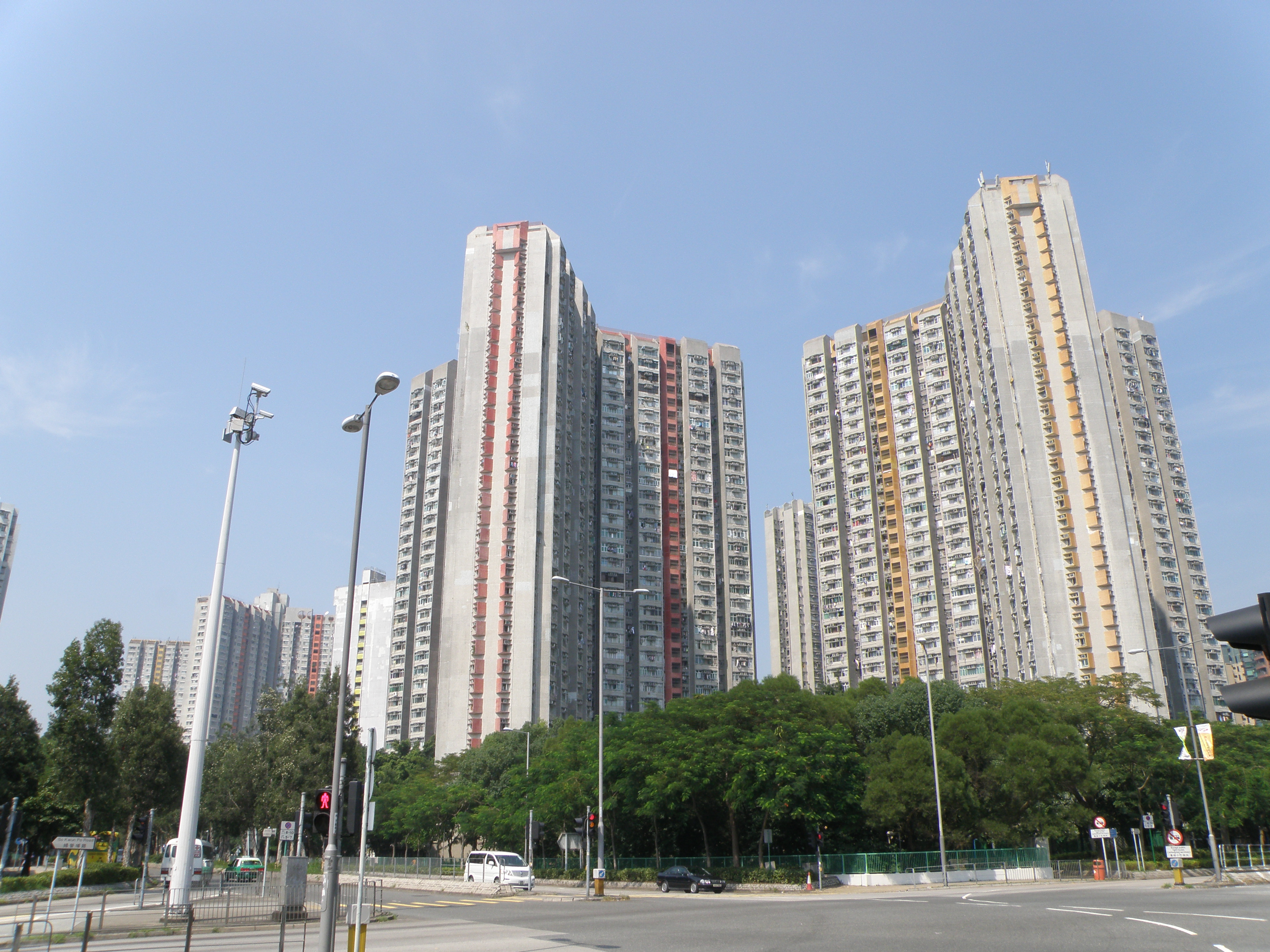
- Tin Ping Estate
- Interactive map of Tin Ping Estate

General information
- Location: 48 Tin Ping Road, Sheung Shui; New Territories, Hong Kong
- Coordinates: 22.50263°N 114.13337°E
- Status: Completed
- Category: Public rental housing
- Population: 17,625 (2016)
- No. of blocks: 7
- No. of units: 1,522

Construction
- Constructed: 1986; 40 years ago
- Authority: Hong Kong Housing Authority

Tin Ping Estate (Chinese: 天平邨) is a public housing estate in Sheung Shui, New Territories, Hong Kong, near Sacred Hill and Tin Ping Shan Tsuen. It is the northernmost mixed public and TPS housing estate in Sheung Shui Town and consists of seven residential buildings completed between 1986 and 1990. Some of the flats were sold to tenants through Tenants Purchase Scheme Phase 3 in 2000.

On Shing Court (安盛苑) is a Home Ownership Scheme court in Sheung Shui, near Tin Ping Estate. It has only one block built in 1990.

== Houses ==
=== Tin Ping Estate ===
Name	Chinese name	Building type	Completed
Tin Yee House	天怡樓	Trident 2	1986
Tin Cheung House	天祥樓	Trident 2	1986
Tin Hor House	天賀樓	Trident 2	1986
Tin Mei House	天美樓	Trident 3	1989
Tin Hee House	天喜樓	Trident 3	1989
Tin Long House	天朗樓	Trident 4	1990
Tin Ming House	天明樓	New Slab	1990

=== On Shing Court ===
Name	Chinese name	Building type	Completed
On Shing Court	安盛苑	Trident 4	1990

== Demographics ==
According to the 2016 by-census, Tin Ping Estate had a population of 17,625. The median age was 51.6 and the majority of residents (99.1 per cent) were of Chinese ethnicity. The average household size was 2.9 people. The median monthly household income of all households (i.e. including both economically active and inactive households) was HK$24,170.

== Politics ==
For the 2019 District Council election, the estate fell within two constituencies. Most of the estate is located in the Tin Ping West constituency, which is represented by Kwok Long-fung, while the remainder of the estate and On Shing Court fall within the Tin Ping East constituency, which was formerly represented by Lau Ki-fung until July 2021.

== COVID-19 pandemic ==
Tin Hee House of Tin Ping Estate was placed under lockdown on 23 February, 2022.

== See also ==
- Public housing estates in Sheung Shui
