= Woodland Crest =

Housing estate in Sheung Shui, Hong Kong

Coordinates: 22.5070°N 114.1325°E

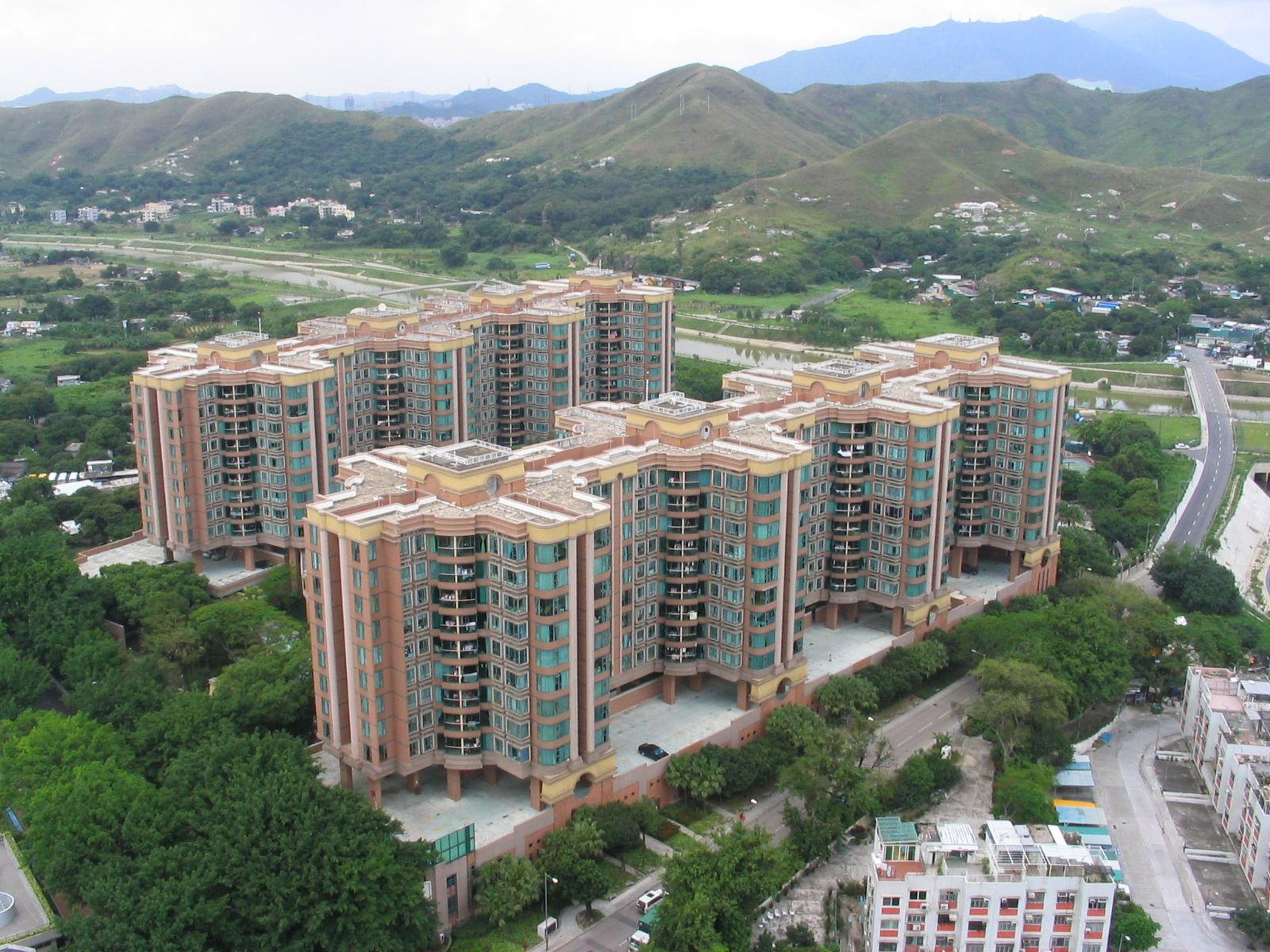
Woodland Crest

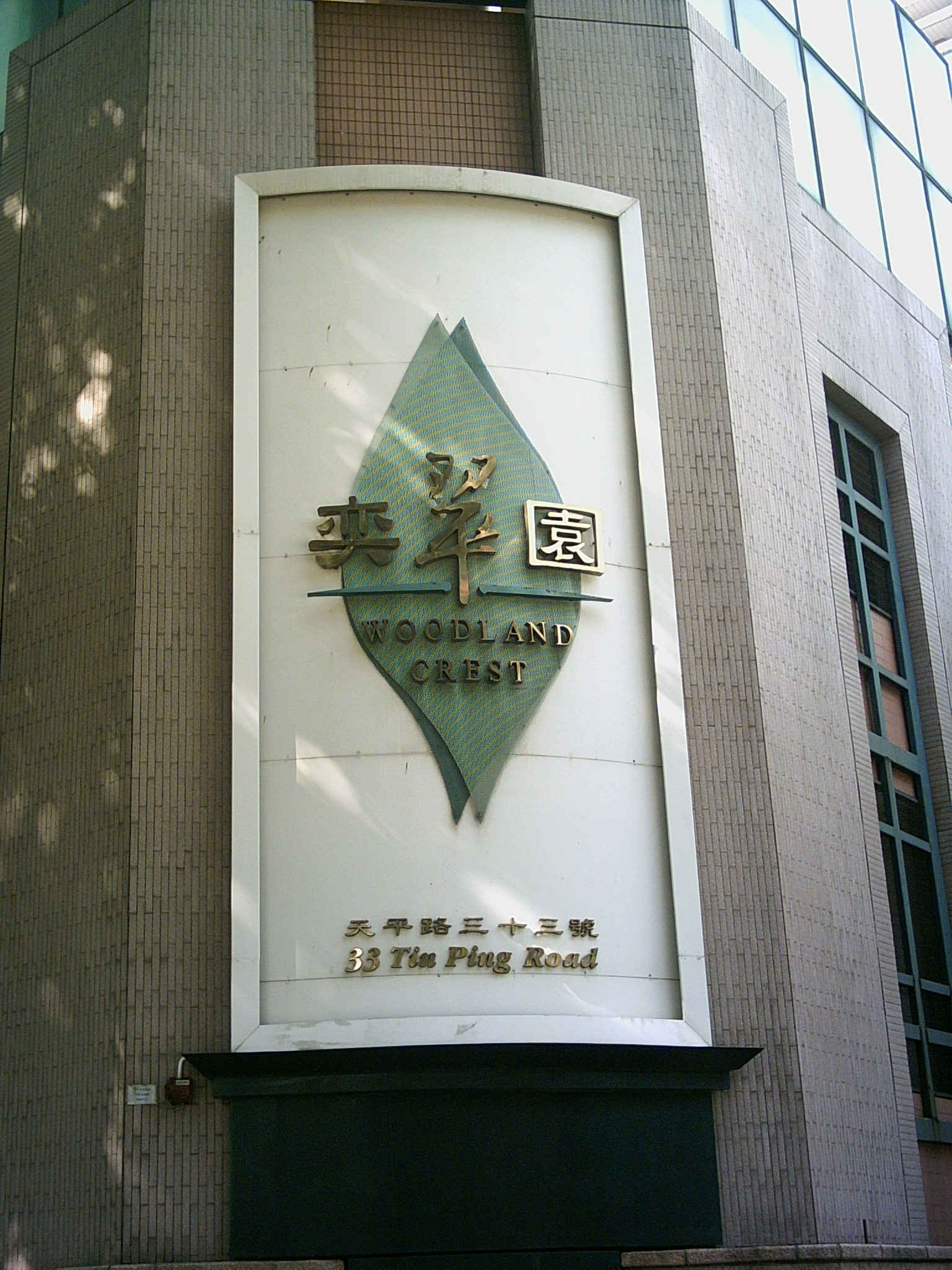
The sign of Woodland Crest on Block 6

Woodland Crest (Chinese: 奕翠園) is a private housing estate in Sheung Shui, New Territories, Hong Kong. It was developed by Sun Hung Kai Properties, and is managed by Hong Yip Service Co. Ltd. It has a total of 548 apartments, and was completed in May 1996. Sun Hung Kai initiated the development of smart cards in the residential complex early in 1996, the first of its kind.

== Location ==
Woodland Crest is located at 33 Tin Ping Road, Sheung Shui, New Territories. To its south lies Tin Ping Estate, a public housing estate, and to its west is Tsui Lai Garden. The Ng Tung River is a major feature that borders Woodland Crest.

== Blocks ==
Woodland Crest has 8 blocks of 9 floors, excluding the car park area that occupies the basement area. Blocks 1-3 and 5 connected as the northern complex and Blocks 6-9 as the southern complex. There is no fourth block or fourth floor, because the number four is considered unlucky by the Chinese.

== Facilities ==
The estate has two tennis courts, two playgrounds, a barbecue area and a club house. The full list of facilities can be found here, in Chinese.

The Sheung Shui Public Leisure Pool and North District Sports Ground are a short distance away, and the complex of shopping centres including Landmark North, Sheung Shui Centre, and Metropolis Plaza are nearby and are linked to the Sheung Shui MTR station.

== Awards ==
Woodland Crest won the Merit of Quality in the "2006 Green Building Award" and the Gold Award for the "Best Landscape Award for Private Property Development" in the High-density Residential Property – Greening Effect category in 2004, which was introduced by the LCSD in the same year.
