= Tung Wah Group of Hospitals Kap Yan Directors' College =

Secondary school in Hong Kong

- 東華三院甲寅年總理中學
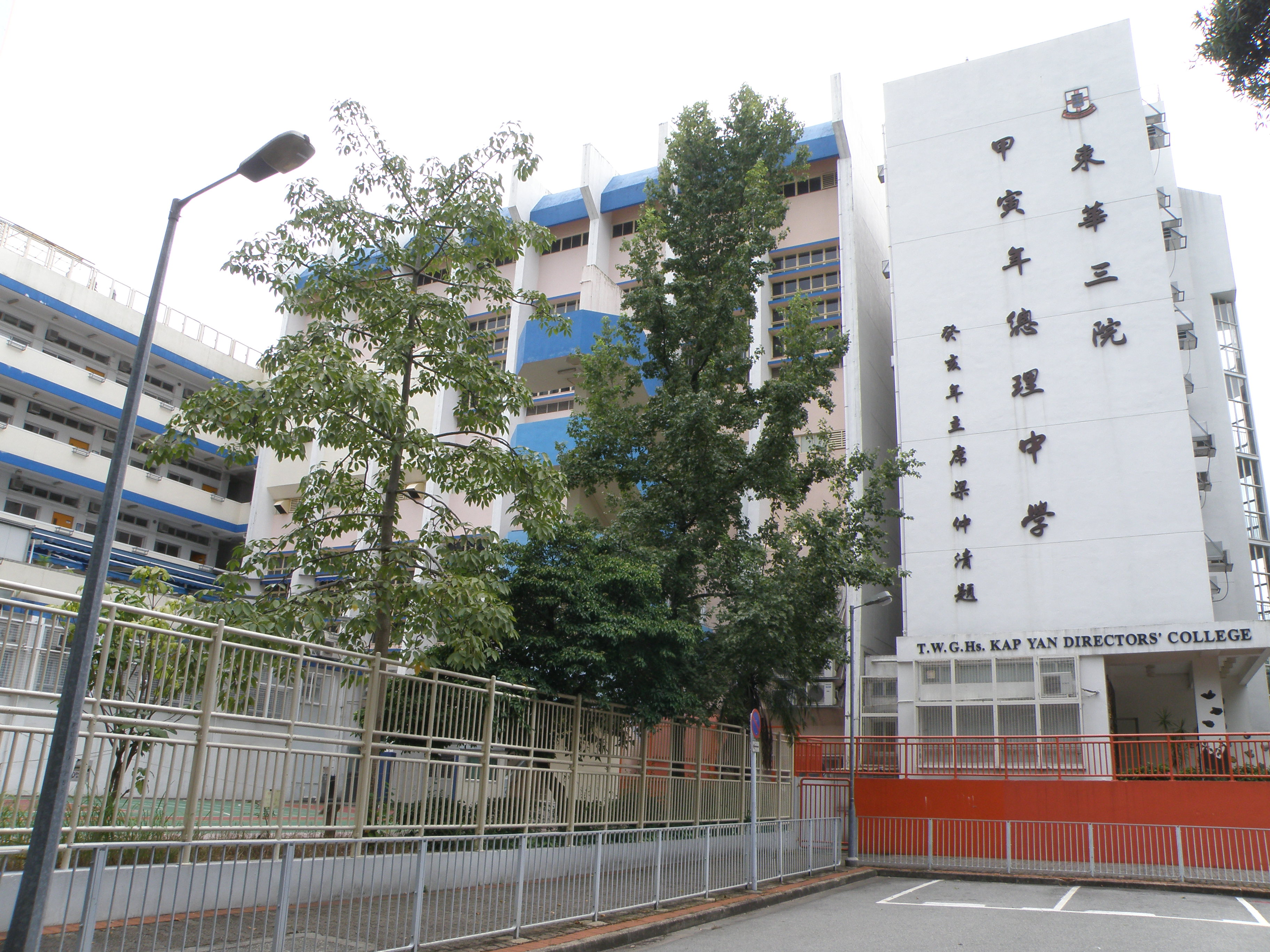
- Pictured in 2014

Location
- Choi Yuen Estate, Sheung Shui, New Territories; Hong Kong
- Coordinates: 22.499029°N 114.129688°E

Information
- School type: Aided Secondary school
- Motto: Diligence, Frugality, Loyalty and Trustworthiness (勤、儉、忠、信)
- Established: 1982; 44 years ago
- School district: North District
- Chairman: Lee Yuk-lun
- Principal: Paul Leung Tung-wing
- Teaching staff: 56 (as of 2016)
- Years: 6
- Gender: Co-educational
- Classes: 24
- Language: Predominantly English
- Campus size: About 4600 m^{2}
- Affiliation: Tung Wah Group of Hospitals
- Website: www.twghkyds.edu.hk

Tung Wah Group of Hospitals Kap Yan Directors' College
- Traditional Chinese: 東華三院甲寅年總理中學
- Simplified Chinese: 东华三院甲寅年总理中学
Transcriptions
Standard Mandarin
- Hanyu Pinyin: Dōnghuá Sānyuàn Jiǎyín Nián Zǒnglǐ Zhōngxué
Yue: Cantonese
- Jyutping: dung1 waa4 saam1 jyun2 gaap3 jan4 nin4 zung2 lei5 zung1 hok6

Tung Wah Group of Hospitals Kap Yan Directors' College (Chinese: 東華三院甲寅年總理中學) is a Hong Kong secondary school. Situated in Choi Yuen Estate, Sheung Shui, New Territories near Sheung Shui station, the grammar school is fully subsidized by Government of Hong Kong. The school adopts English as the medium of instruction (EMI). Established in 1982 and governed by Tung Wah Group of Hospitals, the oldest and largest charitable organization in Hong Kong, the school is the eleventh secondary school established by the organization.

== See also ==
- Tung Wah Group of Hospitals
- Education in Hong Kong
- List of secondary schools in Hong Kong
- List of schools in Hong Kong
