= Choi Yuen (constituency) =

Constituency in North District, Hong Kong

- Elected constituency for the North District Council
- Boundary of Choi Yuen in North District
- District: North
- Legislative Council constituency: New Territories North
- Population: 17,222 (2019)
- Electorate: 11,563 (2019)

Current constituency
- Created: 1988
- Number of members: One
- Member: vacant

Choi Yuen is one of the 17 constituencies in the North District, Hong Kong.

The constituency returns one district councillor to the North District Council, with an election every four years. The seat has been currently held by Lam Tsz-King of the Democratic.

Choi Yuen constituency is loosely based on Choi Yuen Estate and Choi Po Court in Sheung Shui with estimated population of 17,222.

== Councillors represented ==
=== 1988 to 1994 ===
Election	Member	Party	Member	Party
1988	Tik Chi-yuen	Meeting Point	Anthony Yuen Tak-tim	Independent
1991	Tik Chi-yuen	Meeting Point	Wong Sing-chi	Meeting Point
1994	Tik Chi-yuen	Democratic	Wong Sing-chi	Democratic

=== 1994 to present ===
Election	Member	Party
1994	So Sai-chi	Independent
1999	So Sai-chi	DAB
2019	Lam Tsz-king→vacant	Democratic

== Election results ==
=== 2010s ===
North District Council Election, 2019: Choi Yuen
Party	Candidate	Votes	%	±%
Democratic	Lam Tsz-king	4,295	55.23	
DAB	So Sai-chi	3,305	42.50	−13.20
Nonpartisan	Wong Sing-chi	177	2.28	
Majority		990	12.73	
Turnout		7,809	67.59	
Democratic gain from DAB		Swing		

North District Council Election, 2015: Choi Yuen
Party	Candidate	Votes	%	±%
DAB	So Sai-chi	2,481	55.7	–2.1
NDPICG	Clarence Ronald Leung Kam-shing	1,975	44.3	
Majority		506	11.4	
Turnout		4,512	41.0	
DAB hold		Swing		

North District Council Election, 2011: Choi Yuen
Party	Candidate	Votes	%	±%
DAB	So Sai-chi	2,773	57.8	+5.3
Democratic	Wong Sing-chi	1,673	34.9	−12.6
People Power (Frontier)	Au Wai-kong	349	7.3	
DAB hold		Swing		

=== 2000s ===
North District Council Election, 2007: Choi Yuen
Party	Candidate	Votes	%	±%
DAB	So Sai-chi	2,309	52.5	+1.2
Democratic	Hung Ming-lun	2,086	47.5	−1.2
DAB hold		Swing		

North District Council Election, 2003: Choi Yuen
Party	Candidate	Votes	%	±%
DAB	So Sai-chi	1,986	51.3	−0.1
Democratic	Wong Sing-chi	1,886	48.7	+0.8
DAB hold		Swing		

=== 1990s ===
North District Council Election, 1999: Choi Yuen
Party	Candidate	Votes	%	±%
DAB	So Sai-chi	1,580	51.4	−0.6
Democratic	Wong Ching-han	1,471	47.9	+0.4
DAB hold		Swing		

North District Board Election, 1994: Choi Yuen
Party	Candidate	Votes	%	±%
Independent	So Sai-chi	1,409	52.0	+31.2
Democratic	Wong Sing-chi	1,286	47.5	+14.4
Independent gain from Democratic		Swing		

North District Board Election, 1991: Choi Yuen
Party	Candidate	Votes	%	±%
Meeting Point	Tik Chi-yuen	2,550	54.8	−14.5
Meeting Point	Wong Sing-chi	1,539	33.1	
Independent	Chan Yau-ming	1,034	22.9	−5.1
Independent	Leung Kui-tang	974	20.9	
LDF	So Sai-chi	967	20.8	
LDF	Tang Hin-kwong	529	11.4	
Independent	Leung Ho-ming	509	10.9	
Meeting Point hold		Swing		
Meeting Point gain from Independent		Swing		

=== 1980s ===
North District Board Election, 1988: Choi Yuen
Party	Candidate	Votes	%	±%
Meeting Point	Tik Chi-yuen	2,501	69.3	
Independent	Anthony Yuen Tak-tim	1,086	30.1	
Independent	Chan Yau-ming	1,010	28.0	
Independent	Yeung Chi-wing	632	17.5	
Independent	Simon Mok Fu-wah	371	10.3	
Independent	Cheung To-sang	234	6.5	
Meeting Point win (new seat)				
Independent win (new seat)				
