= Choi Yuen Estate =

Public housing estate in Sheung Shui, Hong Kong

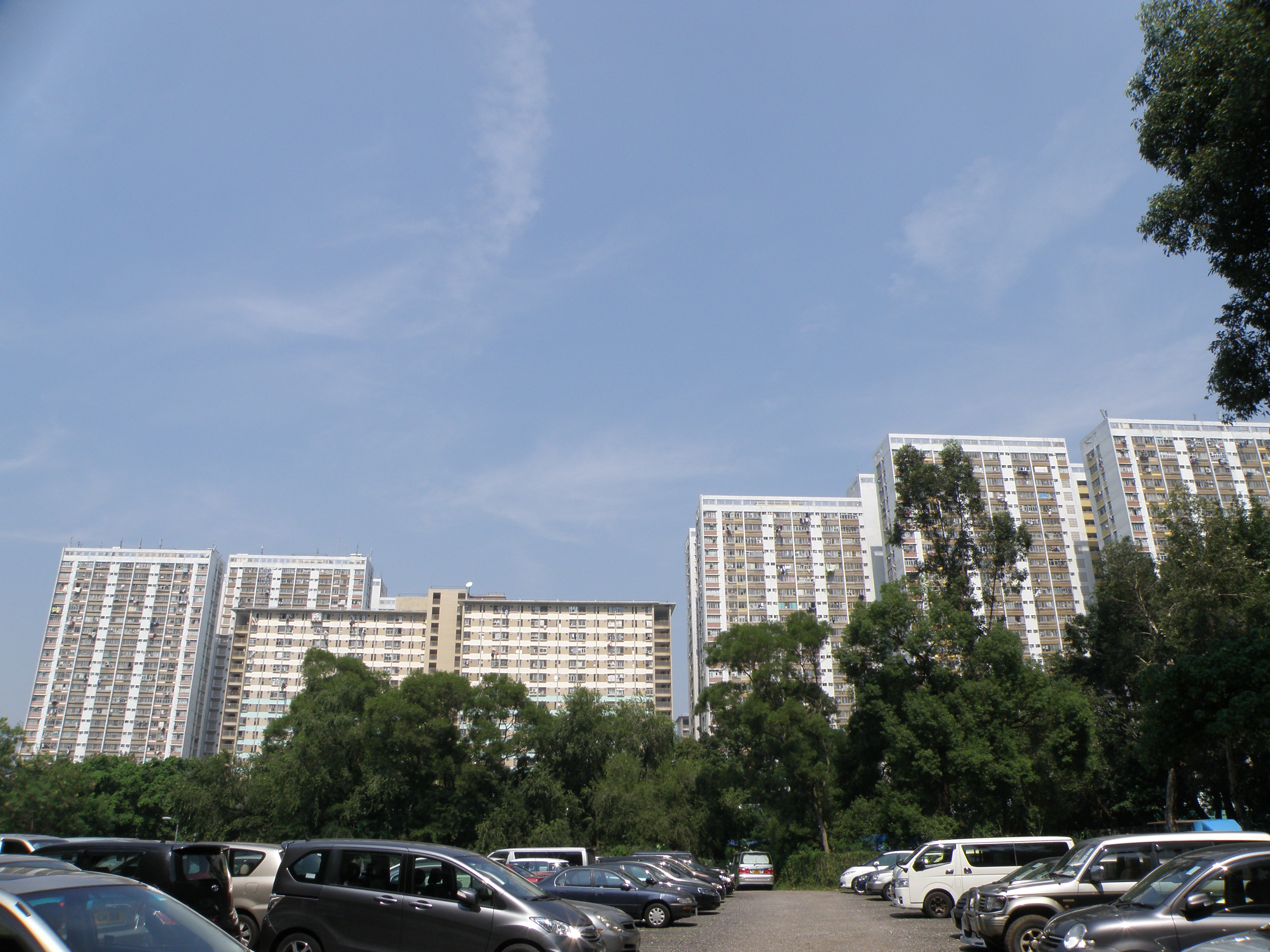
- Choi Yuen Estate
- Interactive map of Choi Yuen Estate

General information
- Location: 8 Choi Yuen Road, Sheung Shui; New Territories, Hong Kong
- Coordinates: 22.5004242°N 114.1249763°E
- Status: Completed
- Category: Public rental housing
- Population: 12,178 (2016)
- No. of blocks: 6
- No. of units: 5,076

Construction
- Constructed: 1981; 45 years ago
- Authority: Hong Kong Housing Authority

Choi Yuen Estate (Chinese: 彩園邨) is a public housing estate in Sheung Shui, New Territories, Hong Kong, near Landmark North and MTR Sheung Shui station. It is the first public housing estate in North District and consists of six residential buildings completed between 1981 and 1983.

Yuk Po Court (旭埔苑) and Choi Po Court (彩蒲苑) are Home Ownership Scheme courts in Sheung Shui near Choi Yuen Estate, built in 1982 and 1984 respectively.

== Background ==
The site of Choi Yuen Estate was formerly occupied by vegetable farms and the nearby village was called Tsoi Yuen Tsuen (Chinese: 菜園村), which meant Vegetable Farm Village in Chinese. In the 1970s, the vegetable farms were removed to construct Choi Yuen Estate; "菜園村" and "彩園邨" sound almost the same except the tone of the character "菜" / "彩". In the 1990s, the village was demolished to build Landmark North, one of the largest shopping malls in North District.

== Houses ==
=== Choi Yuen Estate ===
Name	Chinese name	Building type	Completed
Choi Yuk House	彩玉樓	Old Slab	1981
Choi Ping House	彩屏樓	Old Slab	1981
Choi Chu House	彩珠樓	Old Slab	1981
Choi Lai House	彩麗樓	Old Slab	1981
Choi Wu House	彩湖樓	Triple H	1981
Choi Wah House	彩華樓	Triple H	1983

=== Yuk Po Court ===
Name	Chinese name	Building type	Completed
Ching Wu House	清湖閣	Old-Cruciform	1982
Ming Wu House	明湖閣	Old-Cruciform	1982
Tong Wu House	唐湖閣	Old-Cruciform	1982
Hon Wu House	漢湖閣	Old-Cruciform	1982
Chun Wu House	晉湖閣	Old-Cruciform	1982
Chow Wu House	周湖閣	Old-Cruciform	1982
Seung Wu House	商湖閣	Old-Cruciform	1982
Tsun Wu House	秦湖閣	Old-Cruciform	1982

=== Choi Po Court ===
Name	Chinese name	Building type	Completed
Choi Ying House	彩瑩閣	Windwill	1984
Choi Ching House	彩晶閣	Windwill	1984
Choi Pik House	彩碧閣	Windwill	1984
Choi Ngan House	彩顏閣	Windwill	1985

== Demographics ==
According to the 2016 by-census, Choi Yuen Estate had a population of 12,178, Yuk Po Court had a population of 3,238 while Choi Po Court had a population of 4,816. Altogether the population amounts to 20,232.

== Politics ==
For the 2019 District Council election, the estate fell within two constituencies. Choi Yuen Estate and Choi Po Court are located in the Choi Yuen constituency, which is represented by Lam Tsz-king until July 2021, while Yuk Po Court falls within the Shek Wu Hui constituency, which was formerly represented by Lam Cheuk-ting until March 2021.

== See also ==
- Public housing estates in Sheung Shui
