= Tsung Pak Long =

Village

Tsung Pak Long Chinese: 松柏塱
- Village
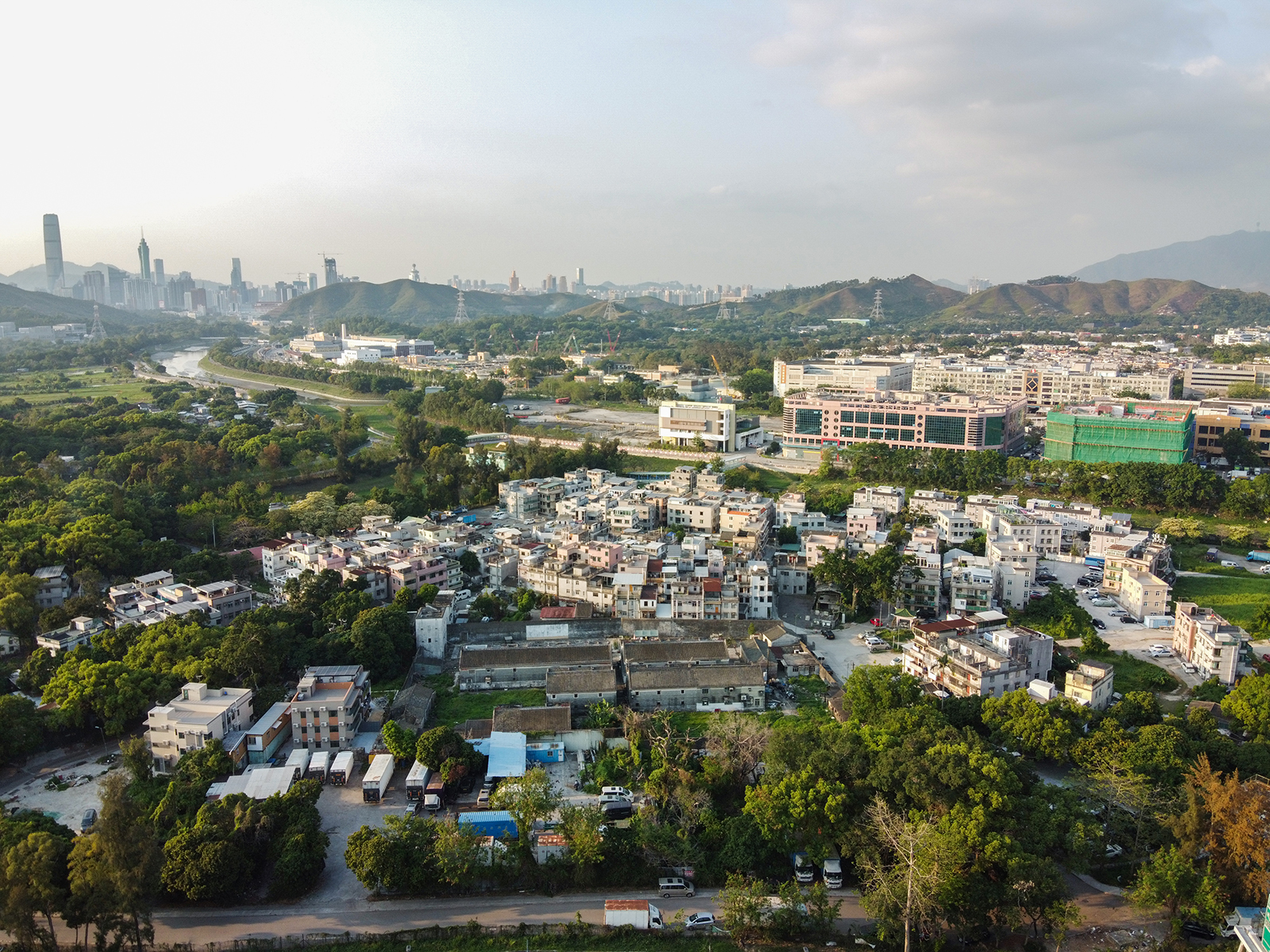
- View of Tsung Pak Long.

- Location within Hong Kong
- Coordinates: 22.504003°N 114.118573°E
- Country: People's Republic of China
- Special administrative region: Hong Kong
- District: North District
- Area: Sheung Shui
- Time zone: UTC+8:00 (HKT)

Tsung Pak Long (Chinese: 松柏塱) is a village and the name of an area in Sheung Shui, North District, Hong Kong.

== Recognised status ==
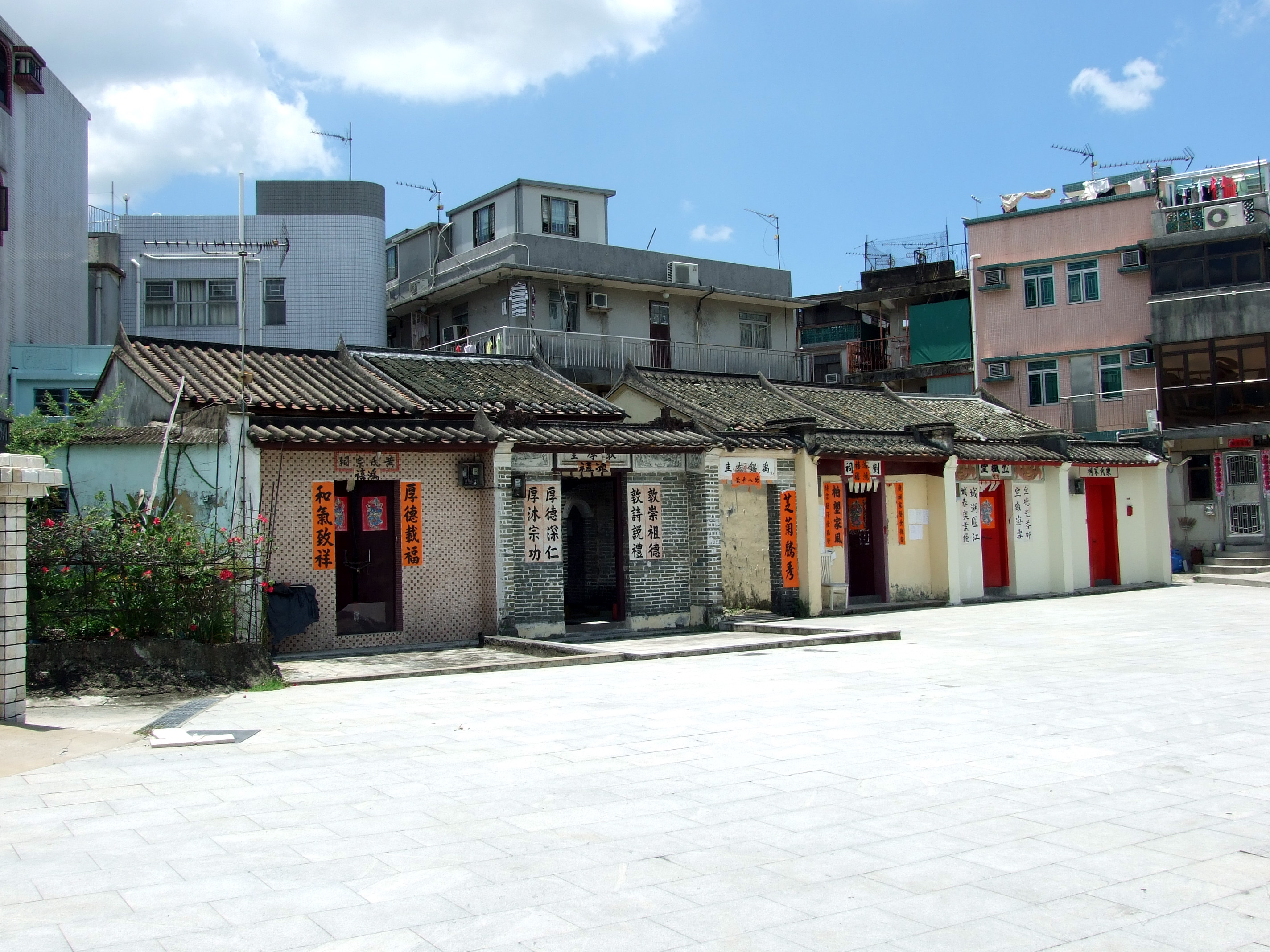
Ancestral halls in Tsung Pak Long.

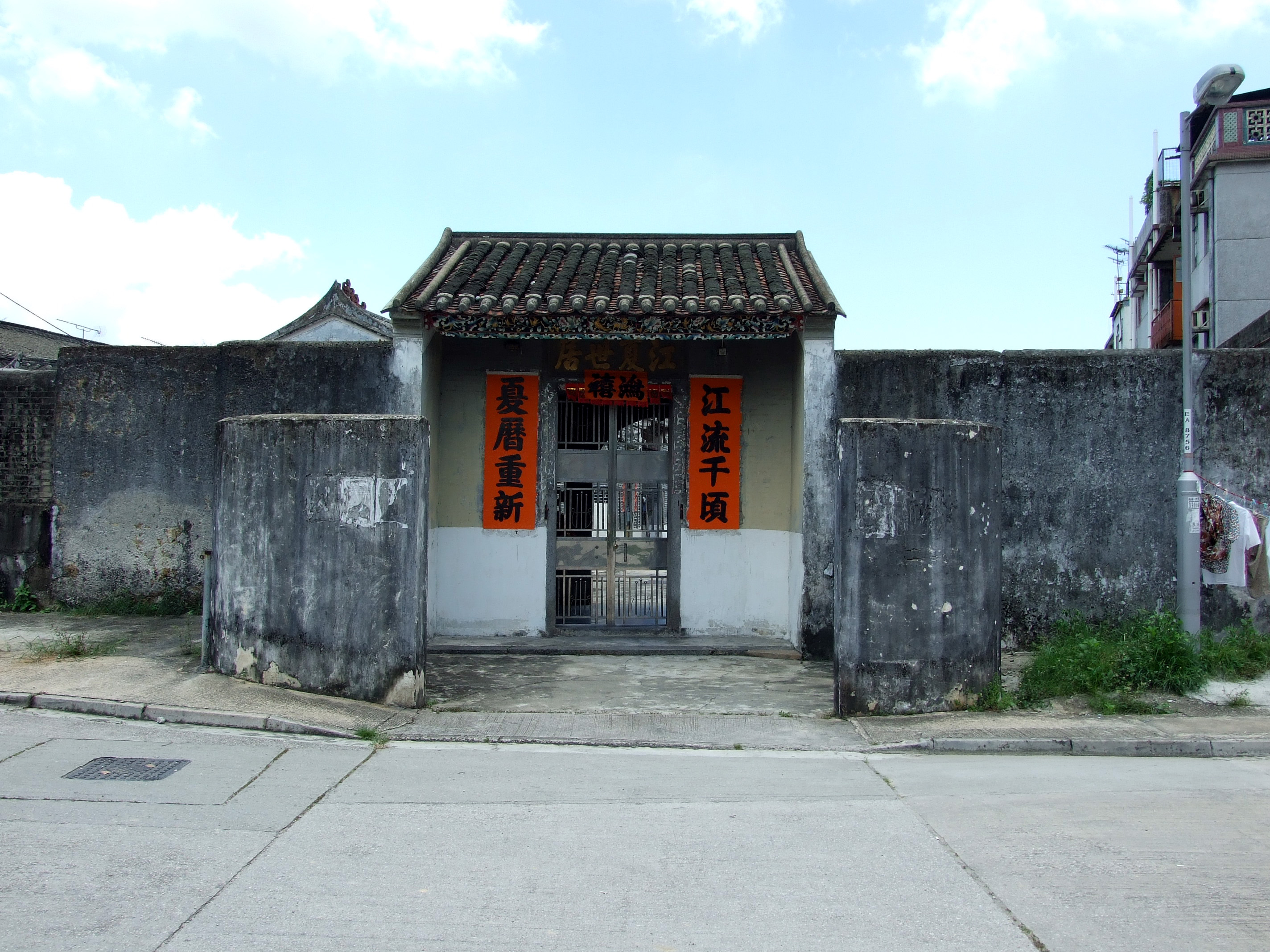
Entrance gate of Hakka Wai.

Tsung Pak Long is a recognised village under the New Territories Small House Policy. It is one of the villages represented within the Sheung Shui District Rural Committee. For electoral purposes, Tsung Pak Long is part of the Fung Tsui constituency, which was formerly represented by Chiang Man-ching until July 2021.

== History ==
Tsung Pak Long was recorded as a Punti village in the Xin'an Xianzhi (Gazetteer of the Sun-On County) of 1819.

At the time of the 1911 census, the population of Tsung Pak Long was 184. The number of males was 105.

== Hakka Wai ==
Hakka Wai (客家圍; 'Walled Village of the Hakkas') is a Hakka walled village located in the Tsung Pak Long area. Construction of the village started in the 1900s-1910s and was completed by 1920.
