= Sheung Shui =

Area of Hong Kong

Coordinates: 22.5102°N 114.1265°E

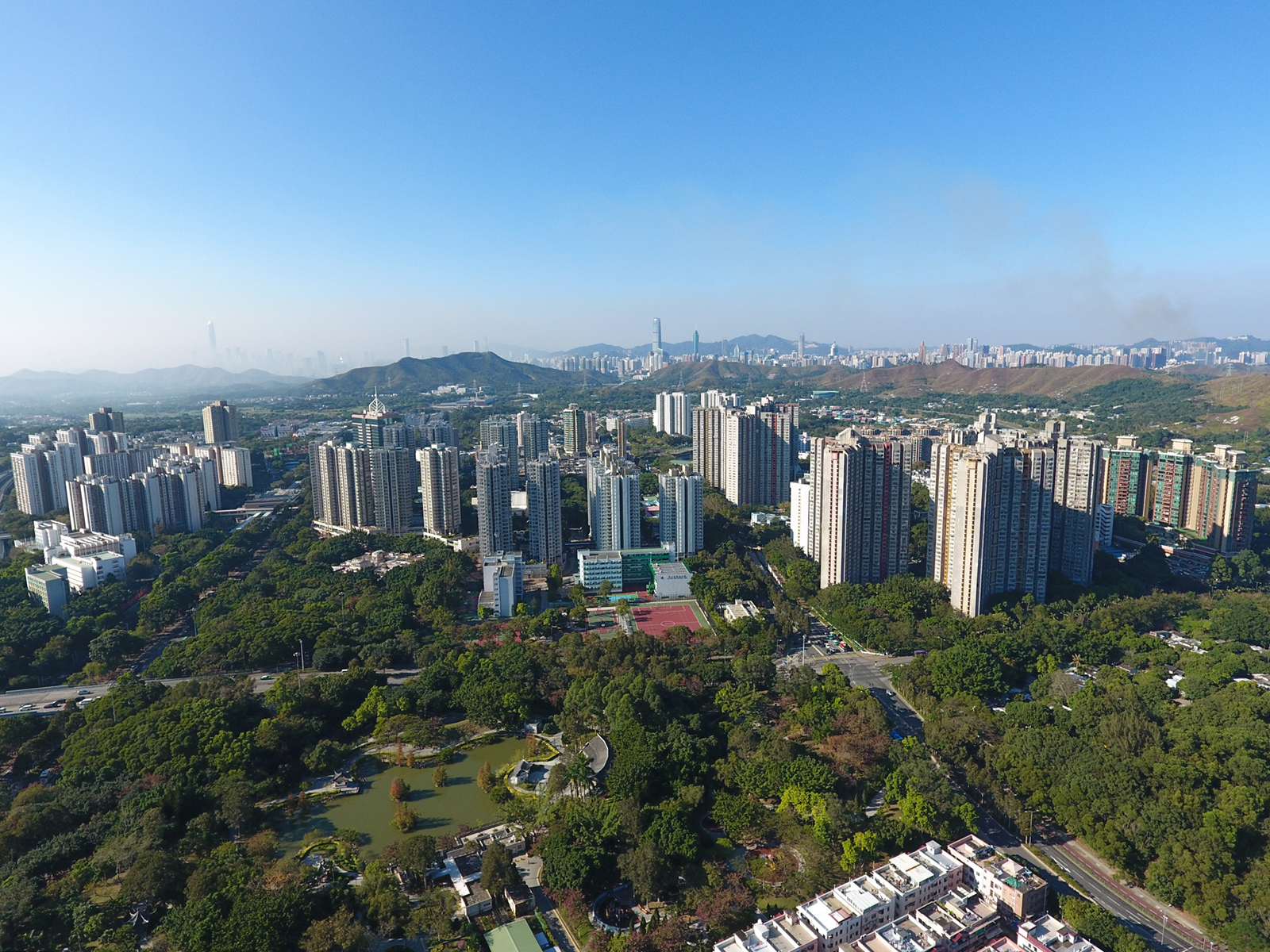
- Aerial view of Sheung Shui
- Chinese: 上水
- Literal meaning: Above the Water
Transcriptions
Standard Mandarin
- Hanyu Pinyin: Shàngshuǐ
Hakka
- Romanization: song1 sui3
Yue: Cantonese
- Jyutping: soeng6 seoi2

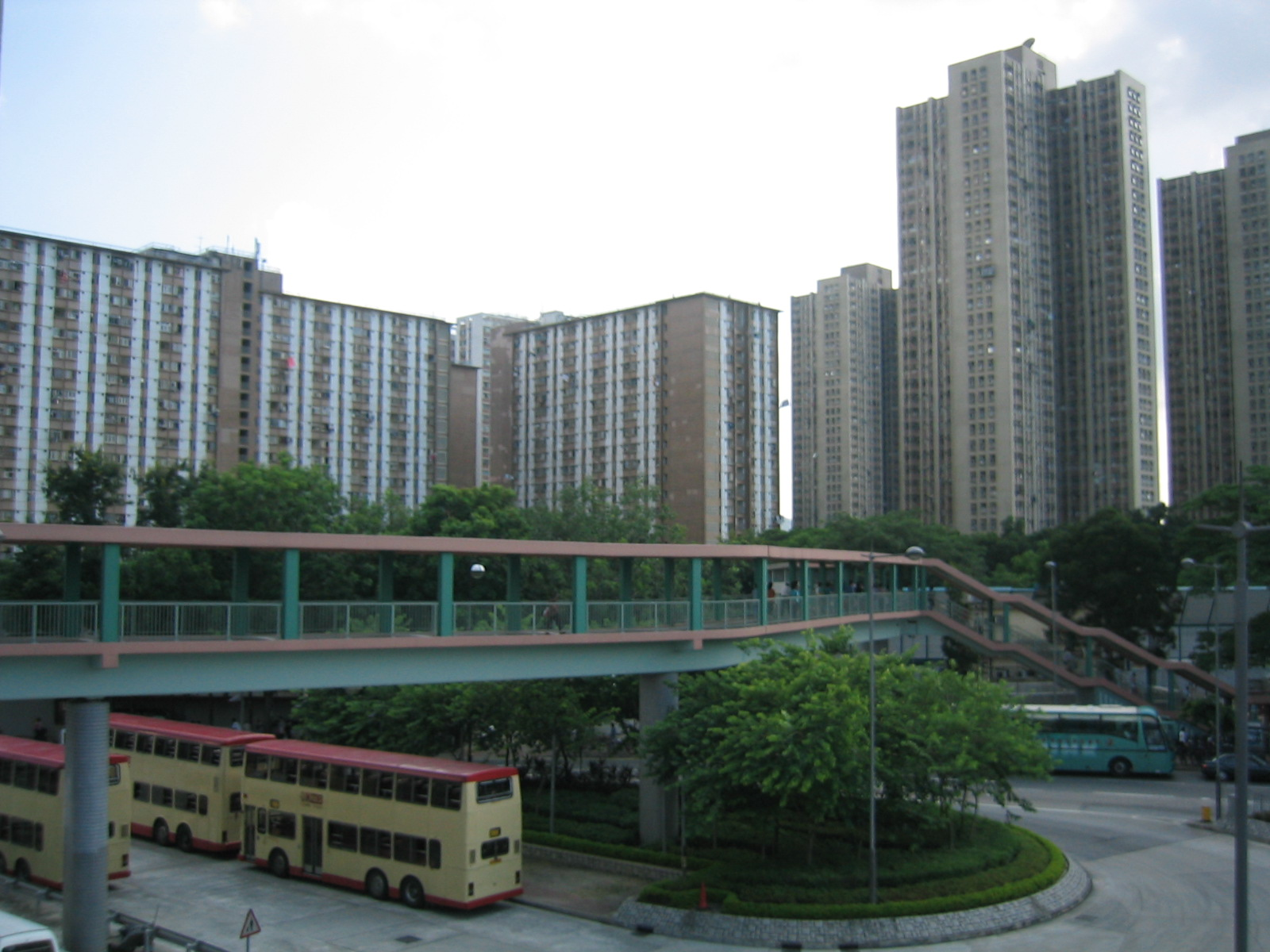
Public estates in Sheung Shui

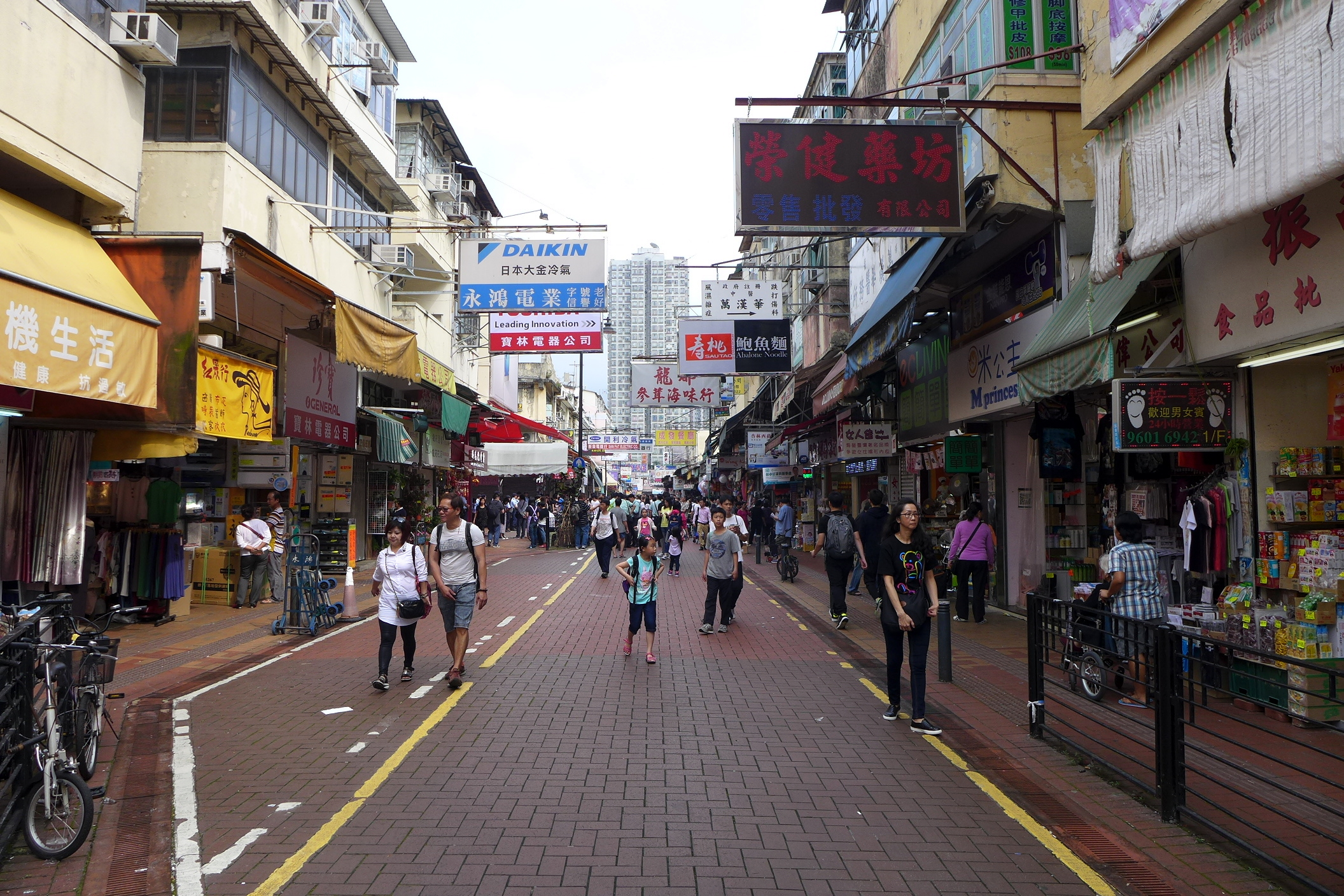
The busy San Hong Street in Shek Wu Hui

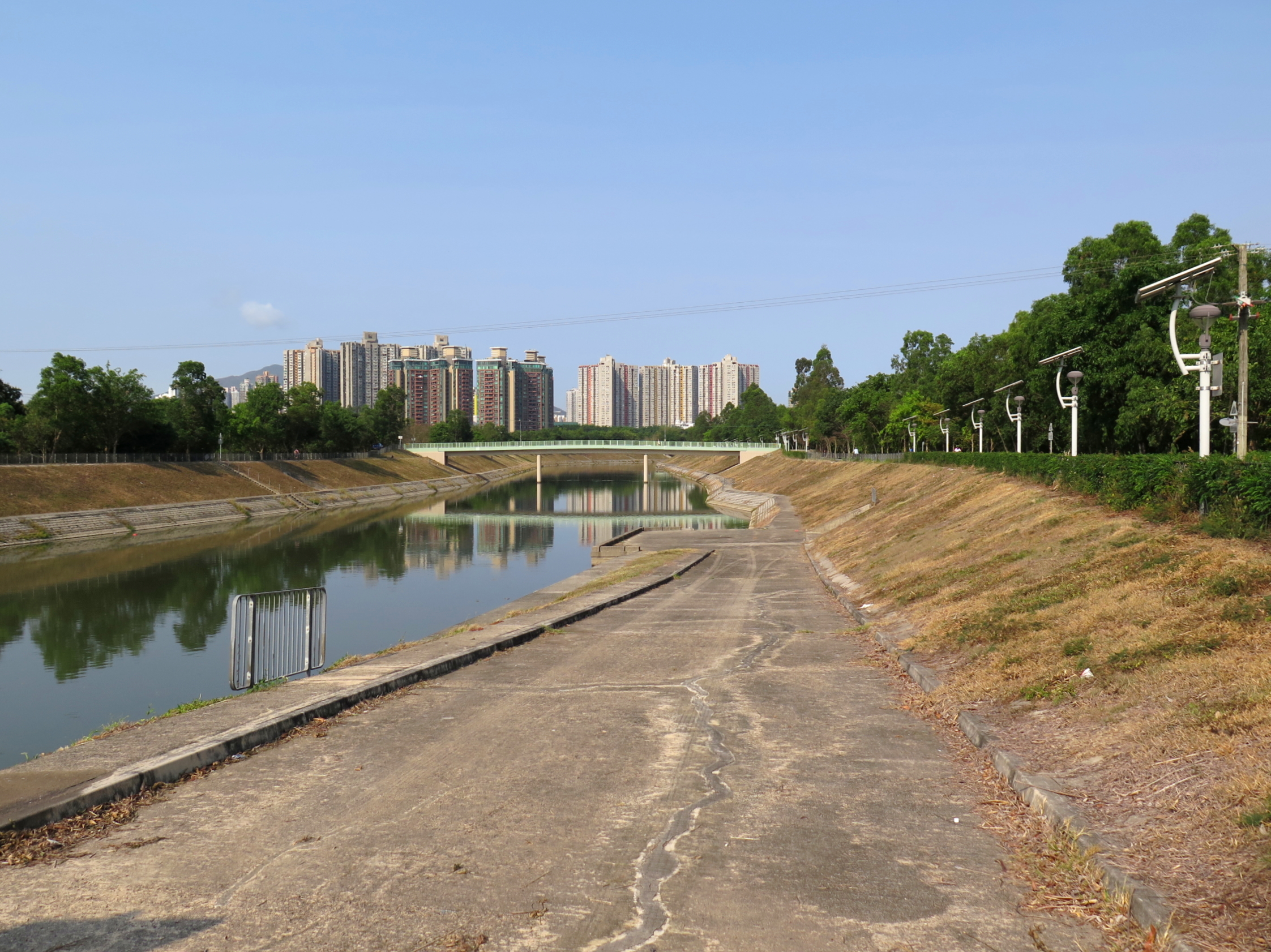
Ng Tung River, looking towards Sheung Shui

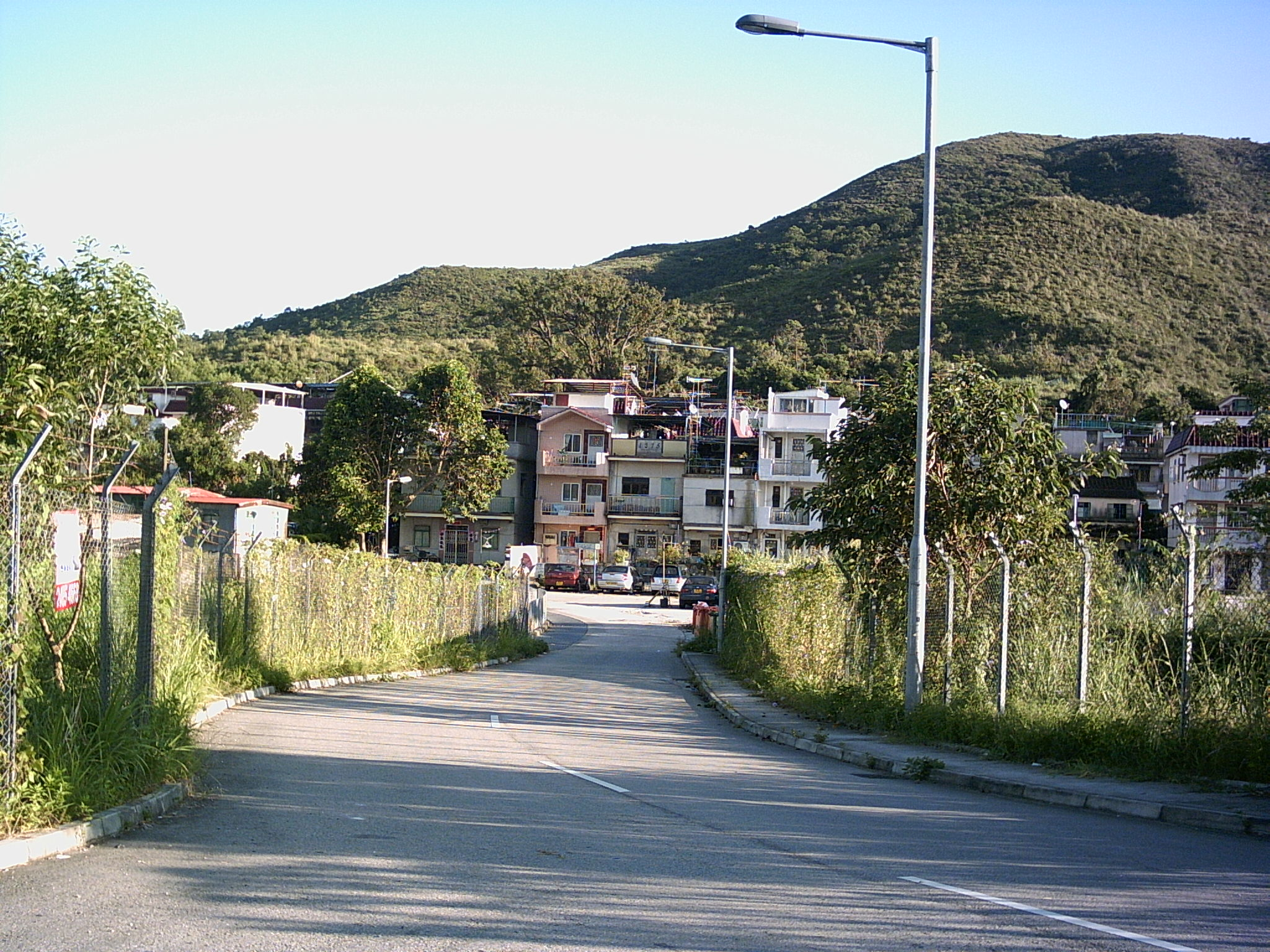
Siu Hang Tsuen, a village in Sheung Shui

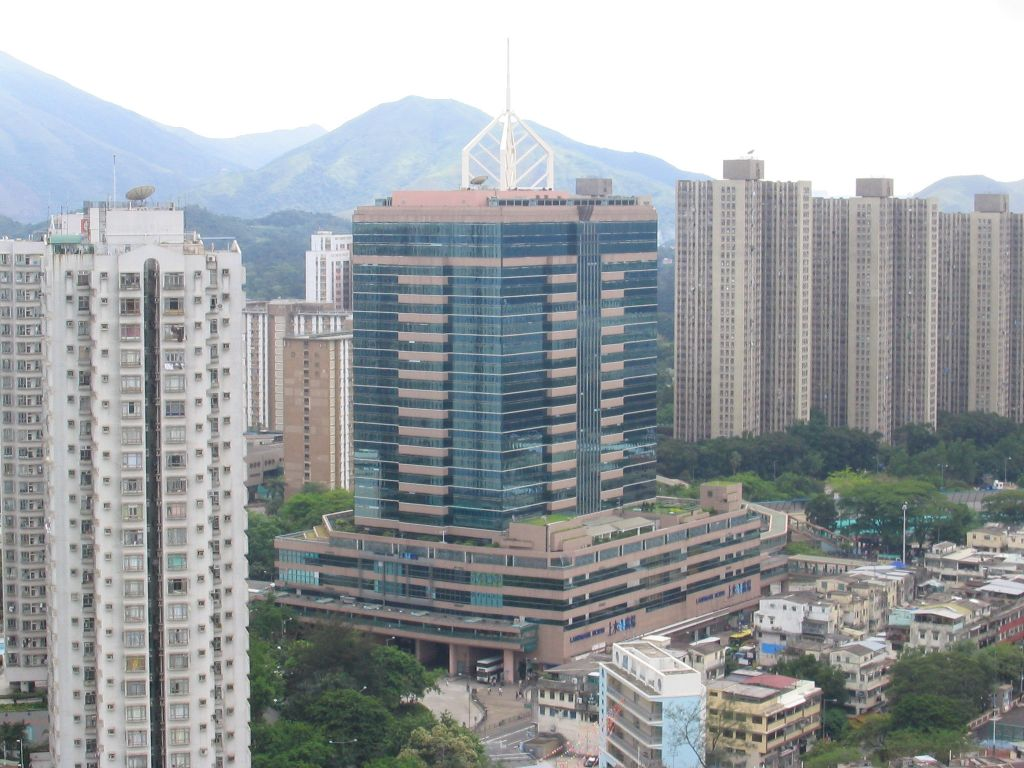
Landmark North

Sheung Shui (Chinese: 上水; Jyutping: soeng6 seoi2, literally "Above-water") is an area in New Territories, Hong Kong. Sheung Shui Town, a part of this area, is part of Fanling–Sheung Shui New Town in North District of Hong Kong. Fanling Town is to its southeast.

== History ==
Shek Wu Hui (石湖墟) used to be the marketplace of the Sheung Shui area, before the development of Sheung Shui Town. Bounded by Lung Sum Avenue (龍琛路), San Fung Avenue and Jockey Club Road, it was the main market in the Sheung Shui area from the 1930s onwards. Today some private residences can be found towering over the old flats in the hui (market). The majority of the buildings still standing were repaired in the 1950s.

Sheung Shui Wai (上水圍), originally lived in by the Liu (廖) clan, is a walled village. The ancestral hall Liu Man Shek Tong (廖萬石堂) in the village is one of the declared monuments of Hong Kong.

The Fung Kai No. 1 Secondary School, located near Sheung Shui Wai and originally established by the Liu clan, is the largest secondary school in Hong Kong, in terms of area covered. More than one turfed football pitch can be found inside the school campus. Because of its green and ample campus, the school used to serve as a scene for local educational television programs.

== Housing estates in Sheung Shui Town ==
=== Public estates ===
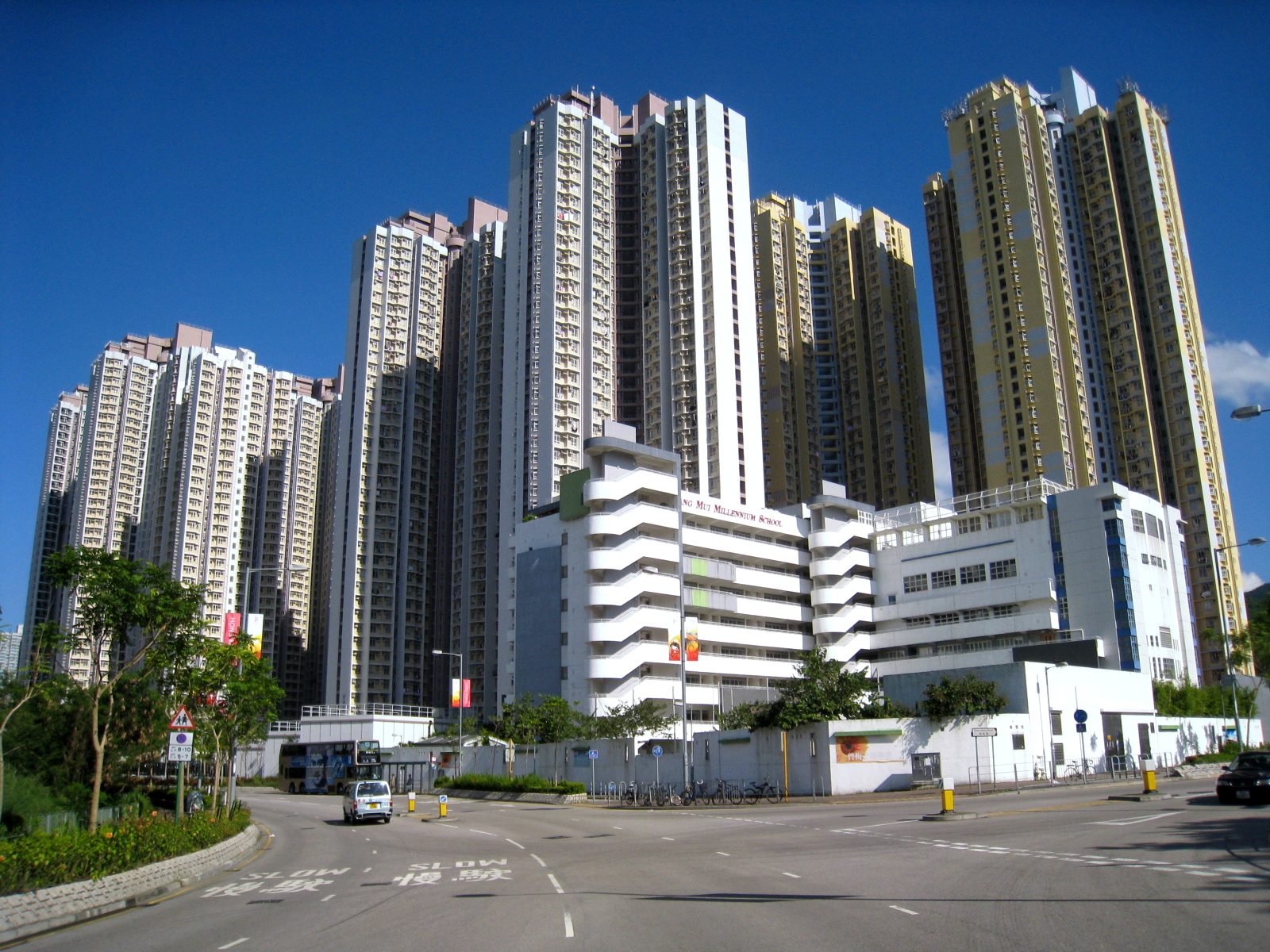
Ching Ho Estate

- Choi Yuen Estate
- Tin Ping Estate
- Tai Ping Estate
- Ching Ho Estate
- Cheung Lung Wai Estate
- Po Shek Wu Estate

=== Home Ownership Scheme Courts ===
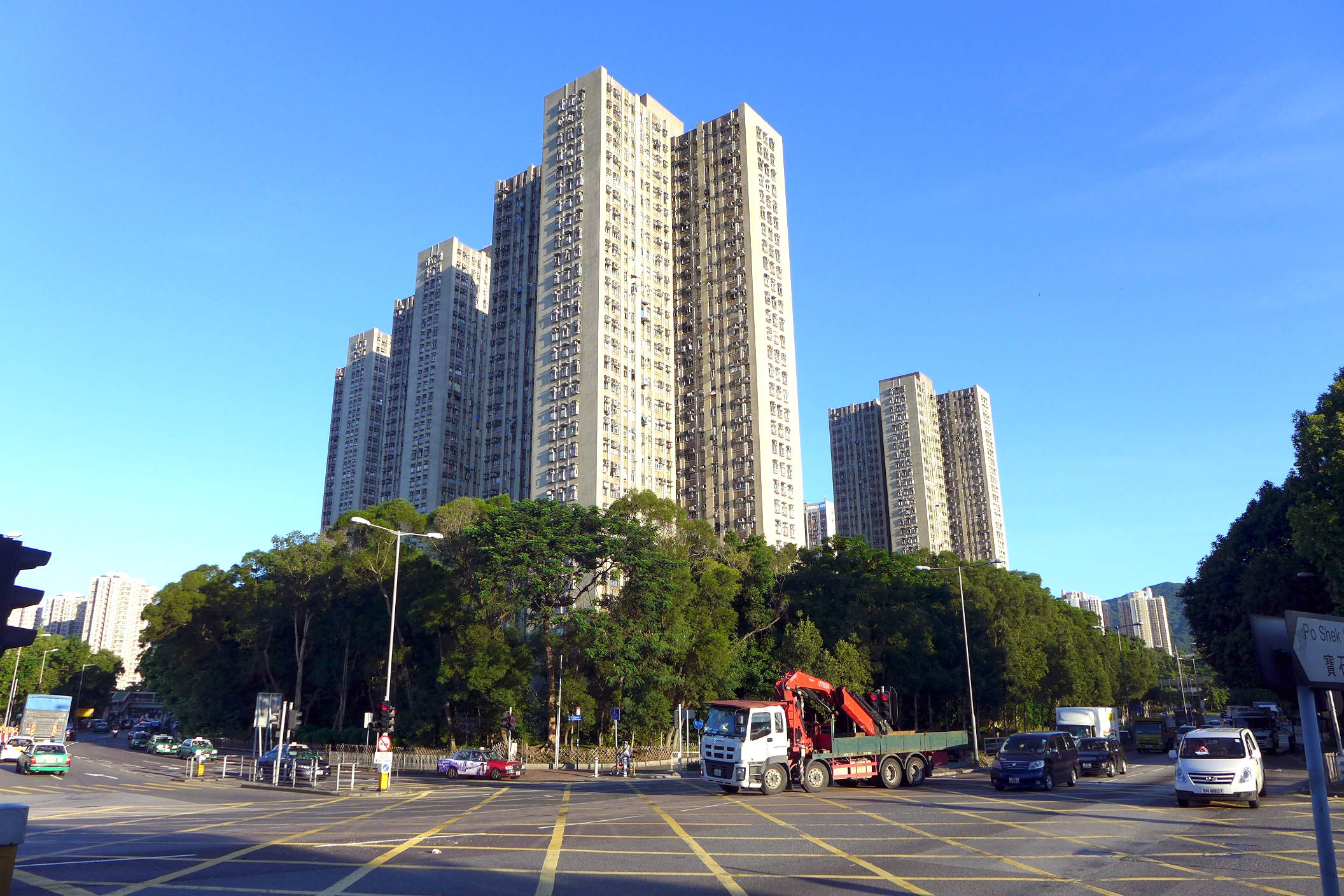
The busy San Hong Street in Shek Wu Hui

- Yuk Po Court
- Choi Po Court
- On Shing Court
- Sunningdale Garden (順欣花園)
- Tsui Lai Garden

=== Private estates ===
- Lung Fung Garden (龍豐花園)
- Metropolis Plaza (新都廣場)
- Sheung Shui Centre (上水中心)
- Sheung Shui Town Centre (上水名都)
- Woodland Crest
- Venice Garden (威尼斯花園)
- Noble Hill (皇府山)
- Royal Green (御皇庭)
- Royal Jubilee (海禧華庭)
- On Kwok Villa (安國新村)
- Pearl Vista (明珠華軒)
- Glorious Peak (顯峰)

== Villages in the Sheung Shui area ==
- Hakka Wai
  - Tsung Pak Long Tsuen (松柏塱村)
  - Tai Tau Leng (大頭嶺)
- Sheung Shui Wai
  - Wai Loi Tsuen (圍內村)
  - Man Kok Tsuen (文閣村)
  - Ha Pak Tsuen (下北村)
  - Sheung Pak Tsuen (上北村)
  - Chung Sam Tsuen (中心村)
  - Tai Yuen Tsuen (大元村)
  - Hing Yan Tsuen (興仁村)
  - Po Sheung Tsuen (莆上村)
  - Mun Hau Tsuen (門口村)
- Fu Tei Au Tsuen (虎地拗村)
- Hung Kiu San Tsuen (紅橋新村)
- Wa Shan Tsuen (華山村)
- Tin Ping Shan Tsuen (天平山村)
- Wu Nga Lok Yeung (烏鴉落陽)
- Shek Wu San Tsuen (石湖新村)
- Ling Shan Tsuen (靈山村)
- Ng Uk Village (吳屋村)
- Siu Hang Tsuen
- Siu Hang San Tsuen (小坑新村)
- 新界五大氏族The Great Five Clans in New Territories-侯氏(HAU)
  - Ho Sheung Heung (河上鄉)
  - Yin Kong Tsuen (燕崗村)
  - Kam Tsin Tsuen (金錢村)
  - Ping Kong (丙崗)

== Shopping centres in Sheung Shui Town ==
- Lung Fung Garden (龍豐花園)
- Metropolis Plaza (新都廣場)
- Sheung Shui Centre (上水中心)
- Sheung Shui Town Centre (上水名都)
- Landmark North

== Community facilities in Sheung Shui Town ==
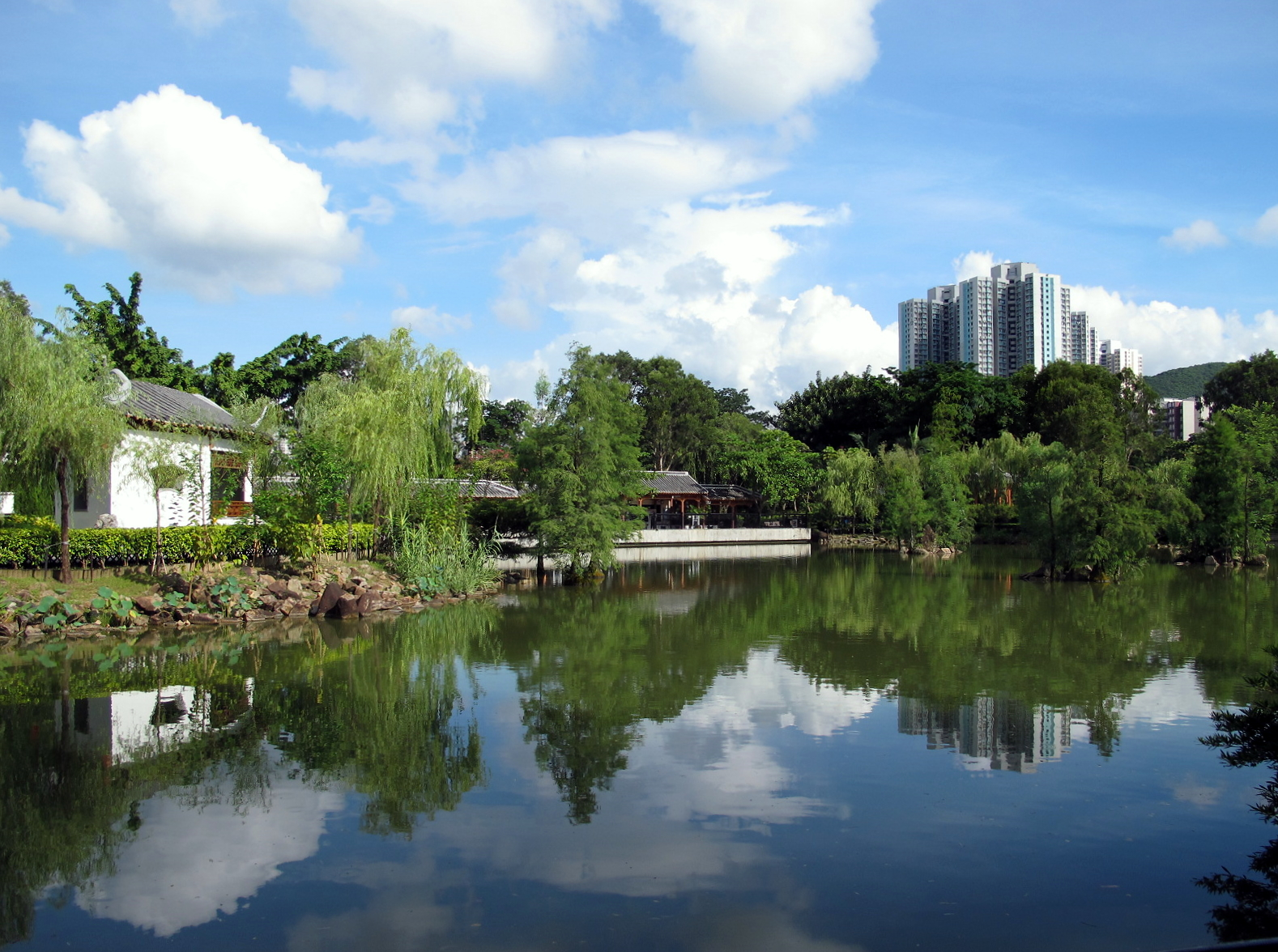
North District Park

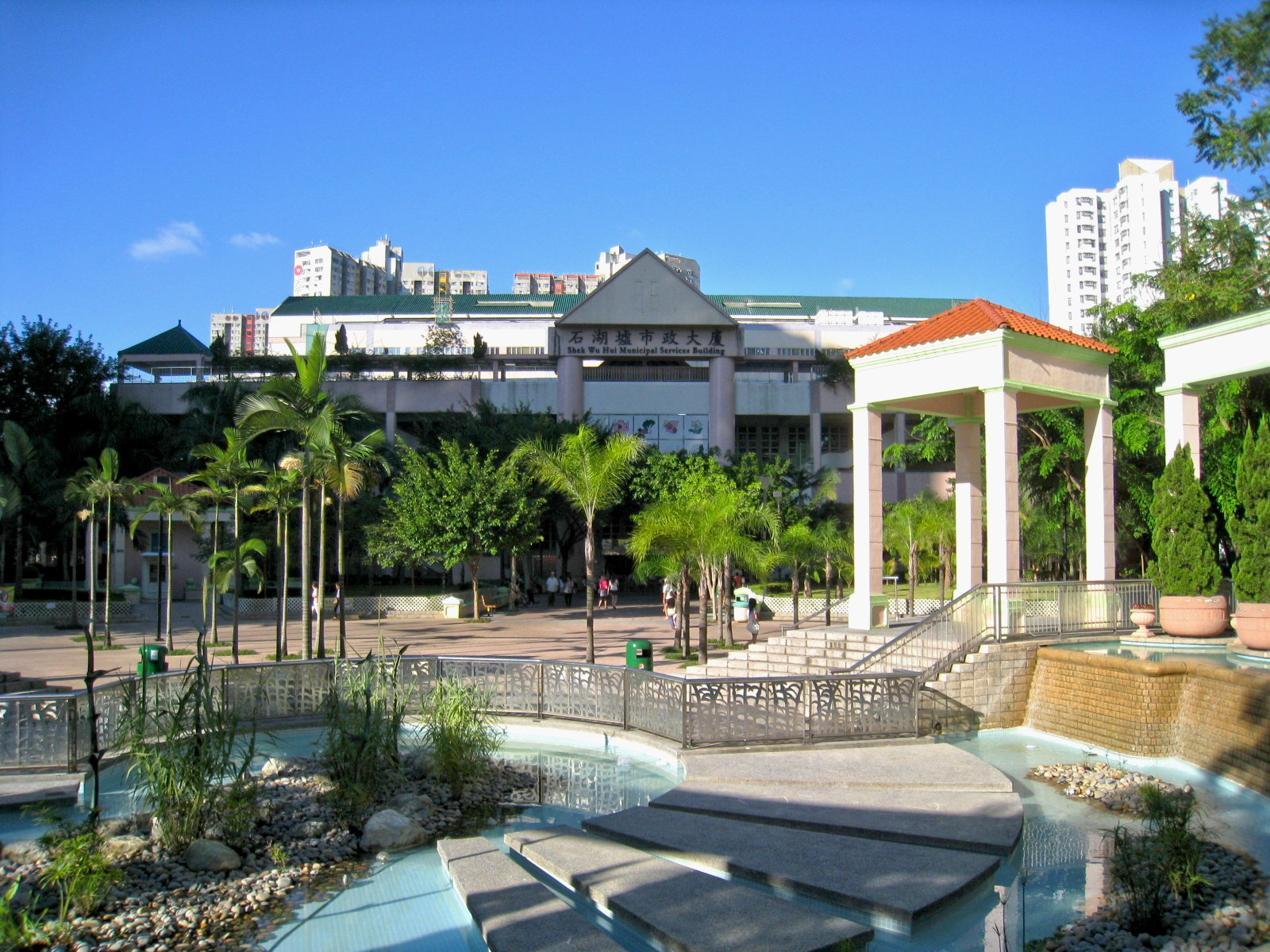
Shek Wu Hui Municipal Services Building

- Lung Sum Avenue Sports Centre (龍琛路體育館)
- North District Park (北區公園)
- North District Sportsground (北區運動場)
- North District Town Hall (北區大會堂)
- Shek Wu Hui Municipal Services Building (石湖墟市政大廈)
- Shek Wu Hui Playground (石湖墟公園)
- Sheung Shui Public Library (上水公共圖書館)
- Sheung Shui Swimming Pool (上水游泳池)
- Tin Ping Sports Centre (天平體育館)

== Public services in Sheung Shui Town ==
- North District Hospital
- Shek Wu Hui Jockey Club Clinic (石湖墟賽馬會診所)
- Shek Wu Hui Post Office (石湖墟郵政局)
- Sheung Shui Fire Station (上水消防局)
- Sheung Shui Library

== Education ==
Schools in Sheung Shui Town include:

- Hong Kong Taoist Association Tang Hin Memorial Secondary School (香港道教聯合會鄧顯紀念中學)
- Sheung Shui Government Secondary School (上水官立中學)
- Tung Wah Group of Hospitals Kap Yan Directors' College (東華三院甲寅年總理中學)

Sheung Shui is in Primary One Admission (POA) School Net 80. Within the school net are multiple aided schools (operated independently but funded with government money); no government schools are in this net.

Hong Kong Public Libraries operates the Sheung Shui Public Library in the Shek Wu Hui Municipal Services Building.

== Transport ==
Sheung Shui Town and the rest of the Sheung Shui area is served by the Sheung Shui station of the East Rail line in the Sheung Shui's town centre. This line takes them into Kowloon within 40 minutes, and then onto surrounding areas through connections with other MTR lines.

Many KMB routes and minibus routes serve Sheung Shui. Residents can take buses to other parts of North District, western New Territories (including Yuen Long Town, Tuen Mun new Town and Tsuen Wan new Town), Tai Po new Town, Sha Tin new Town, most parts of northern Hong Kong Island, parts of Kowloon and the Hong Kong International Airport. The KMB bus terminus and the green minibus terminus are located by Landmark North in Sheung Shui Town. Also, a non-schedule red minibus terminus is located at San Hong Street in Sheung Shui Town.

Taxi ranks are located around the town, including outside the MTR station, Landmark North shopping centre and on side roads branching off of San Fung Avenue. Ma Sik Road is a road connecting Sheung Shui and Fanling in Hong Kong. It is an U-shaped road.

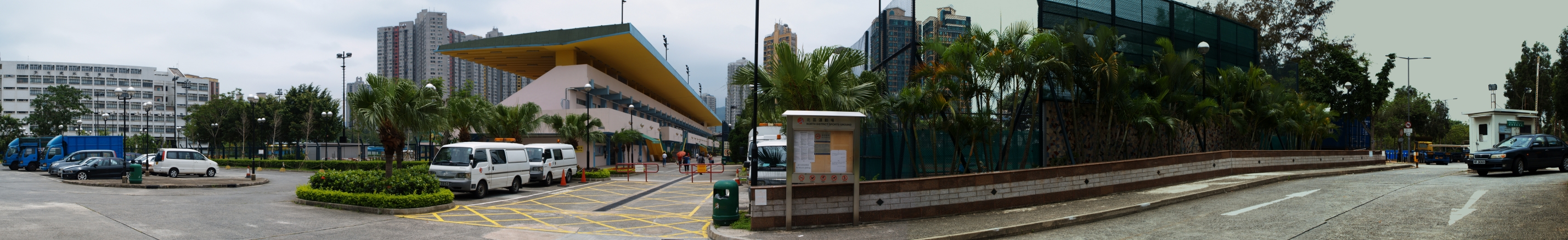
North District Sportsground
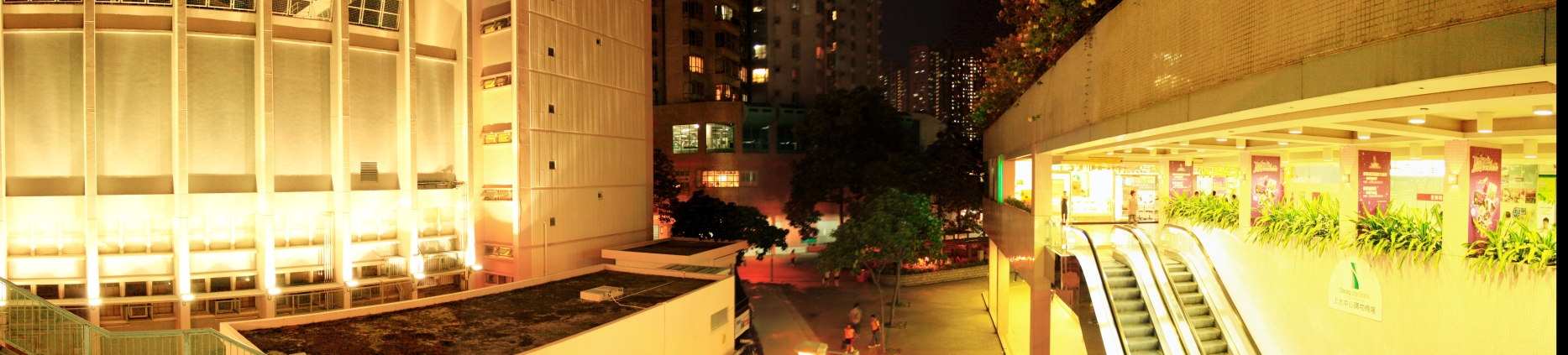
Junction between Sheung Shui Centre and North District Town Hall
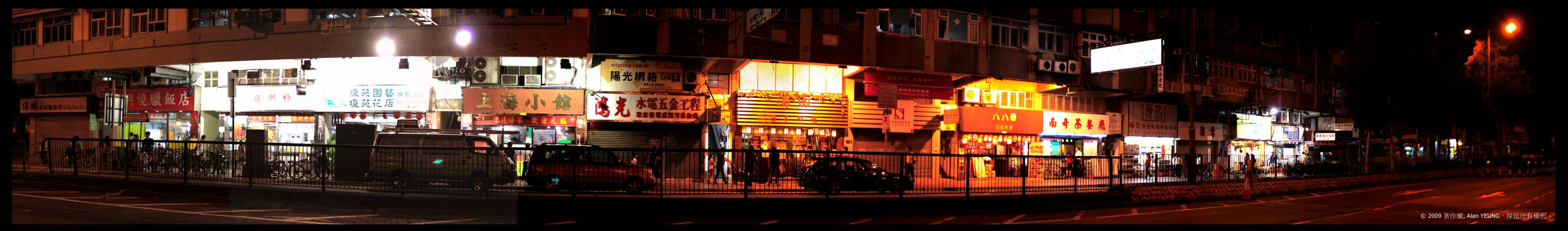
Jockey Club Road in 2009
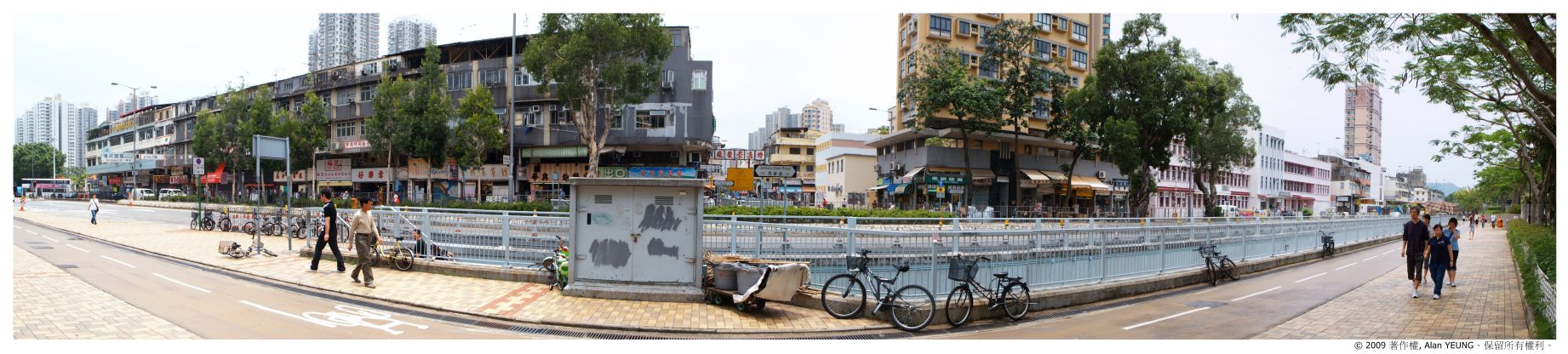
Jockey Club Road in 2009

== Cross-border activities ==
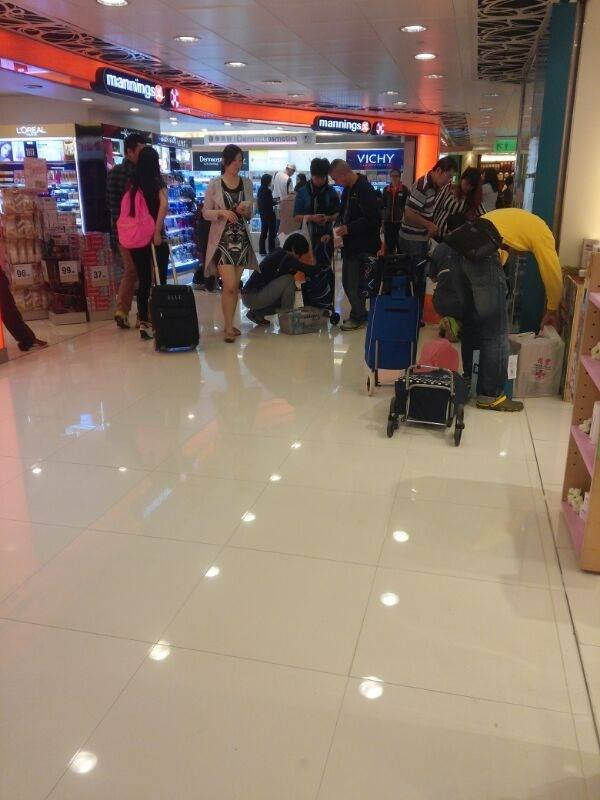
Parallel Traders outside Mannings in Landmark North

Due to their proximity to the Shenzhen border, towns in the northern parts of Hong Kong, notably Sheung Shui and Yuen Long, have become hubs for parallel traders who have been buying up large quantities of goods, forcing up local prices and disrupting the daily lives of local citizens. Since 2012, there has been a vertiginous increase in mainland parallel traders arriving in the North District of Hong Kong to re-export infant formula and household products – goods popular with mainlanders – across the border to Shenzhen. Trafficking caused chronic local shortages of milk powder in Hong Kong, forcing the government to impose restrictions on the amount of milk powder exports from Hong Kong.

The first anti-parallel trading protest was started at Sheung Shui in September 2012. As government efforts to limit the adverse impact of mainland trafficking were widely seen as inadequate, so there have been further subsequent protests in towns in the North District including Sheung Shui.

== Climate ==
Climate data for Sheung Shui (2005–2020)
| Month | Jan | Feb | Mar | Apr | May | Jun | Jul | Aug | Sep | Oct | Nov | Dec | Year |
|---|---|---|---|---|---|---|---|---|---|---|---|---|---|
| Mean daily maximum °C (°F) | 20.1 (68.2) | 21.0 (69.8) | 23.2 (73.8) | 26.7 (80.1) | 30.1 (86.2) | 31.8 (89.2) | 33.1 (91.6) | 32.9 (91.2) | 32.5 (90.5) | 30.0 (86.0) | 26.2 (79.2) | 21.6 (70.9) | 27.4 (81.4) |
| Daily mean °C (°F) | 15.4 (59.7) | 16.8 (62.2) | 19.3 (66.7) | 22.8 (73.0) | 26.3 (79.3) | 28.1 (82.6) | 28.9 (84.0) | 28.5 (83.3) | 27.9 (82.2) | 25.4 (77.7) | 21.6 (70.9) | 16.8 (62.2) | 23.2 (73.7) |
| Mean daily minimum °C (°F) | 12.2 (54.0) | 13.9 (57.0) | 16.4 (61.5) | 19.9 (67.8) | 23.6 (74.5) | 25.5 (77.9) | 25.9 (78.6) | 25.5 (77.9) | 24.9 (76.8) | 22.3 (72.1) | 18.5 (65.3) | 13.5 (56.3) | 20.2 (68.3) |
| Average precipitation mm (inches) | 37.8 (1.49) | 29.8 (1.17) | 67.5 (2.66) | 141.6 (5.57) | 286.4 (11.28) | 415.5 (16.36) | 320.2 (12.61) | 364.2 (14.34) | 232.9 (9.17) | 88.5 (3.48) | 39.9 (1.57) | 26.5 (1.04) | 2,050.8 (80.74) |
| Average relative humidity (%) | 73.1 | 76.6 | 79.0 | 80.5 | 81.7 | 83.6 | 81.7 | 82.8 | 79.4 | 73.3 | 73.4 | 68.7 | 77.8 |
Source: Hong Kong Observatory

== See also ==
- Fanling
- Long Valley
