= Landmark North =

Coordinates: 22.50271°N 114.12784°E

上水廣場 Landmark North

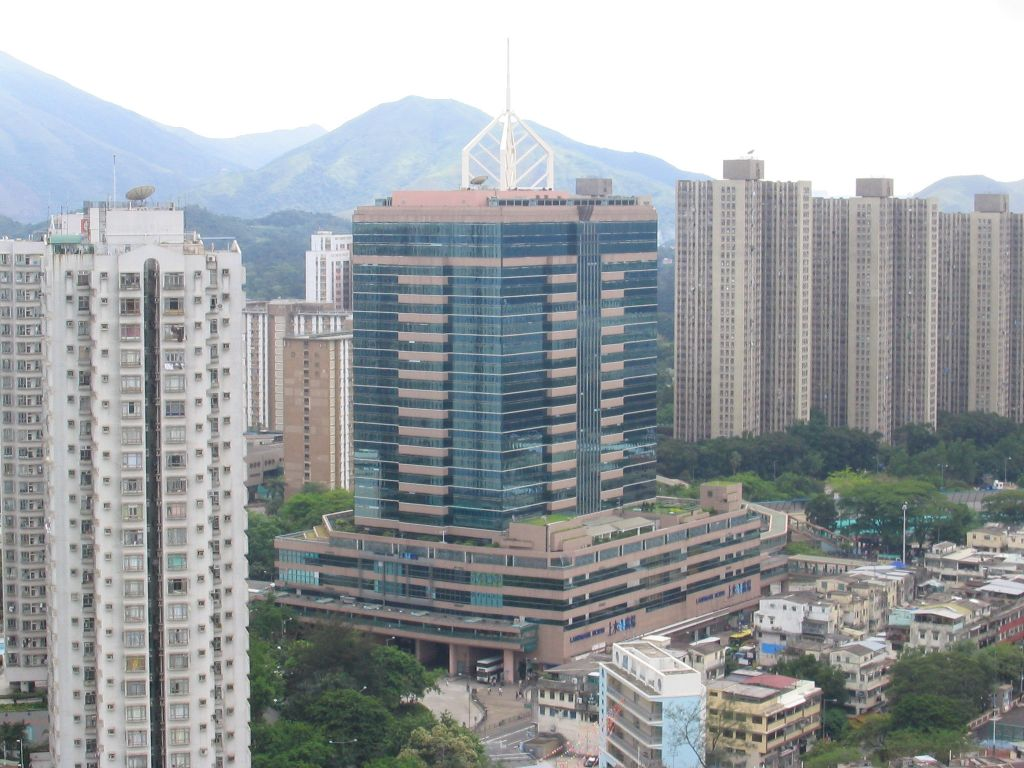
- Landmark North

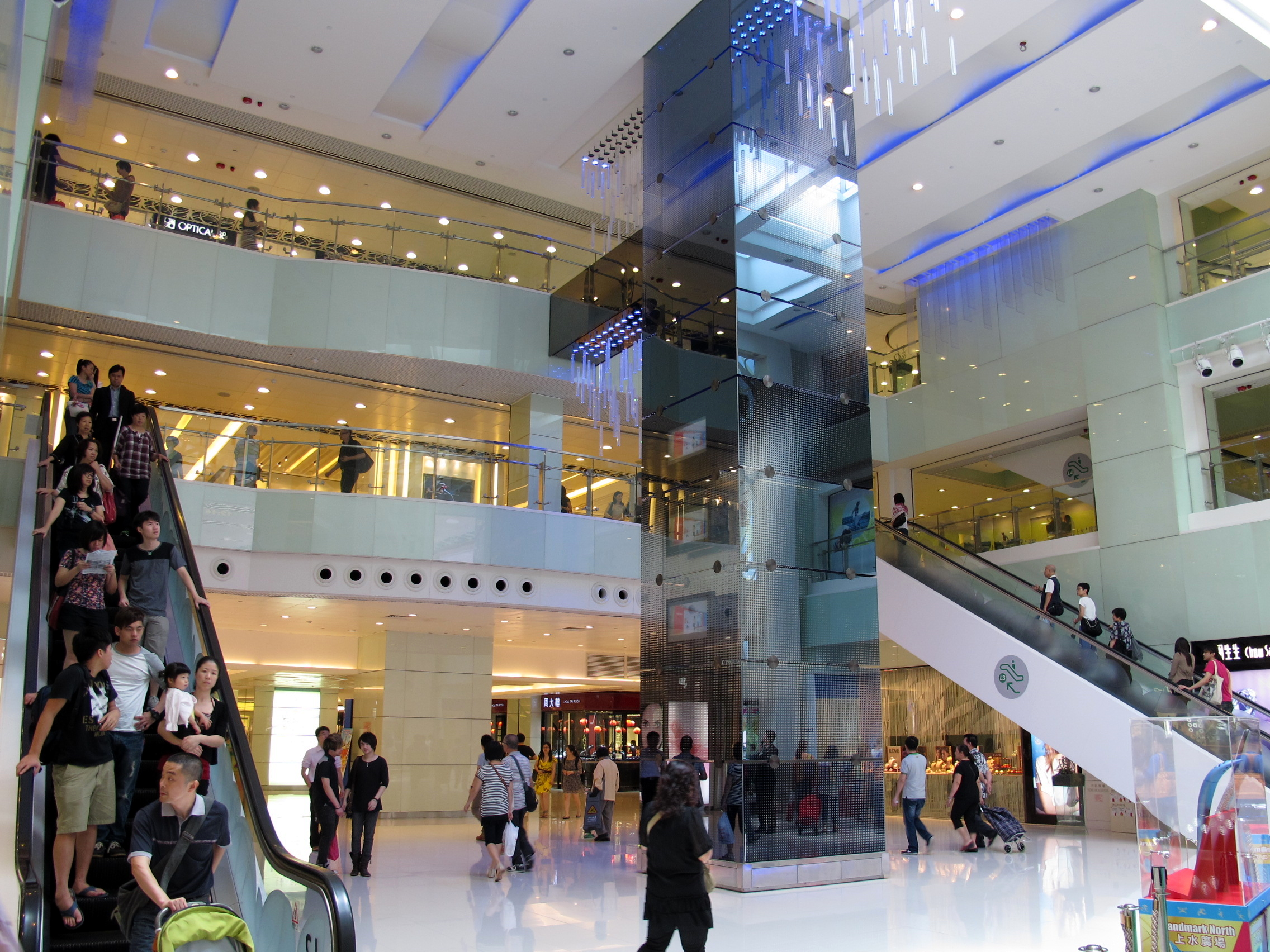
Landmark North after renovation

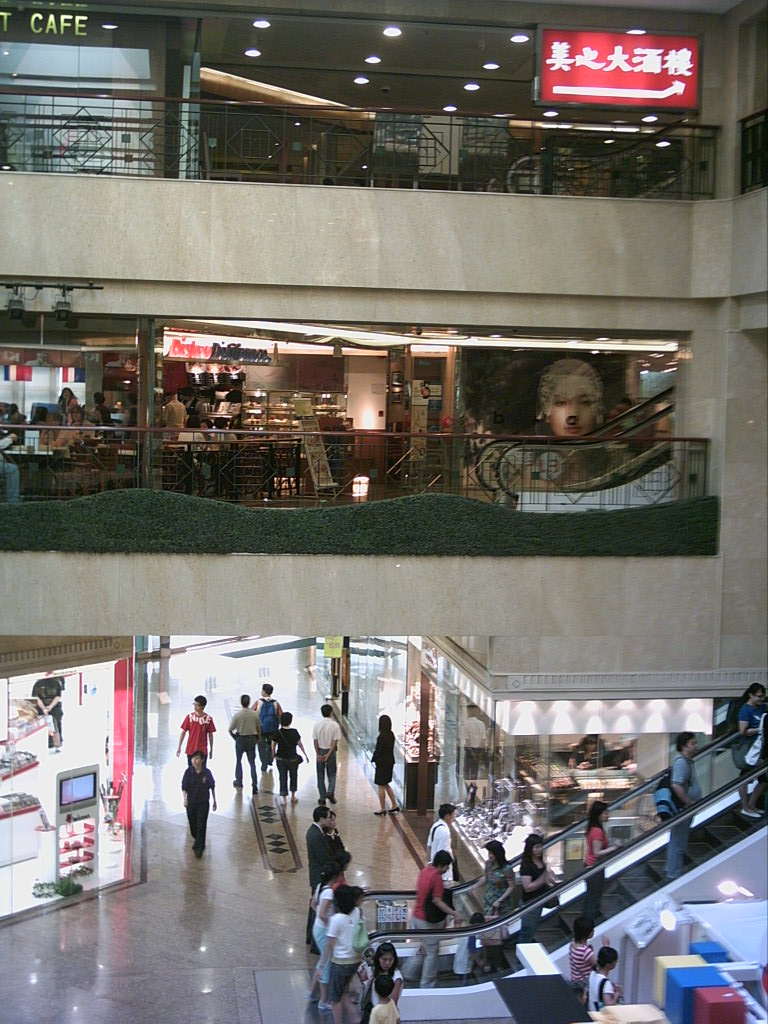
Landmark North before renovation

Landmark North (Chinese: 上水廣場) is an office tower-and-shopping centre complex in Sheung Shui, Hong Kong. It was developed by Sun Hung Kai Properties and is located in the commercial centre of Sheung Shui.

== Location ==
Landmark North is situated at 39 Lung Sum Avenue in Sheung Shui. A footbridge connects it with Sheung Shui station. Landmark North is connected to Metropolis Plaza by a footbridge. The three other main shopping centres in Sheung Shui, Sheung Shui Centre, Sheung Shui Town Centre, and Lung Fung Plaza together with Metropolis Plaza and Landmark North form a large shopping complex in the heart of Sheung Shui, just by Sheung Shui station.

== Shops ==
There are many different types of shops and other services in Landmark North, below are lists of some notable shops.

=== Food ===
Aji Ichiban, Fairwood, Tai Hing, 牛摩 hot pot restaurant, Wing Wah Cake Shop, Saint Honore Cake Shop, Maxim Hong Kong Day

=== Fashion and sport ===
Baleno, Bauhaus, G2000, HOSO Place, Mirabell, Walker Shop

=== Jewellery ===
Chow Sang Sang, Chow Tai Fook, Just Gold, Luk Fook Jewellery, Mabelle, My Jewelry (in Chinese)

=== Travel agencies ===
- Wing On Travel Services

=== Other shops ===
Eu Yan Sang, The Body Shop, The Commercial Press, OSIM

== Nearby facilities ==
- North District Town Hall (北區大會堂)
- Shek Wu Hui Wet Market (石湖墟街市)
- Shek Wu Hui Municipal Services Building (石湖墟市政大廈)
- Sheung Shui Public Library (上水公共圖書館)
- Sheung Shui station (上水站)
