= Sheung Shui station =

MTR station in the New Territories, Hong Kong

Sheung Shui 上水
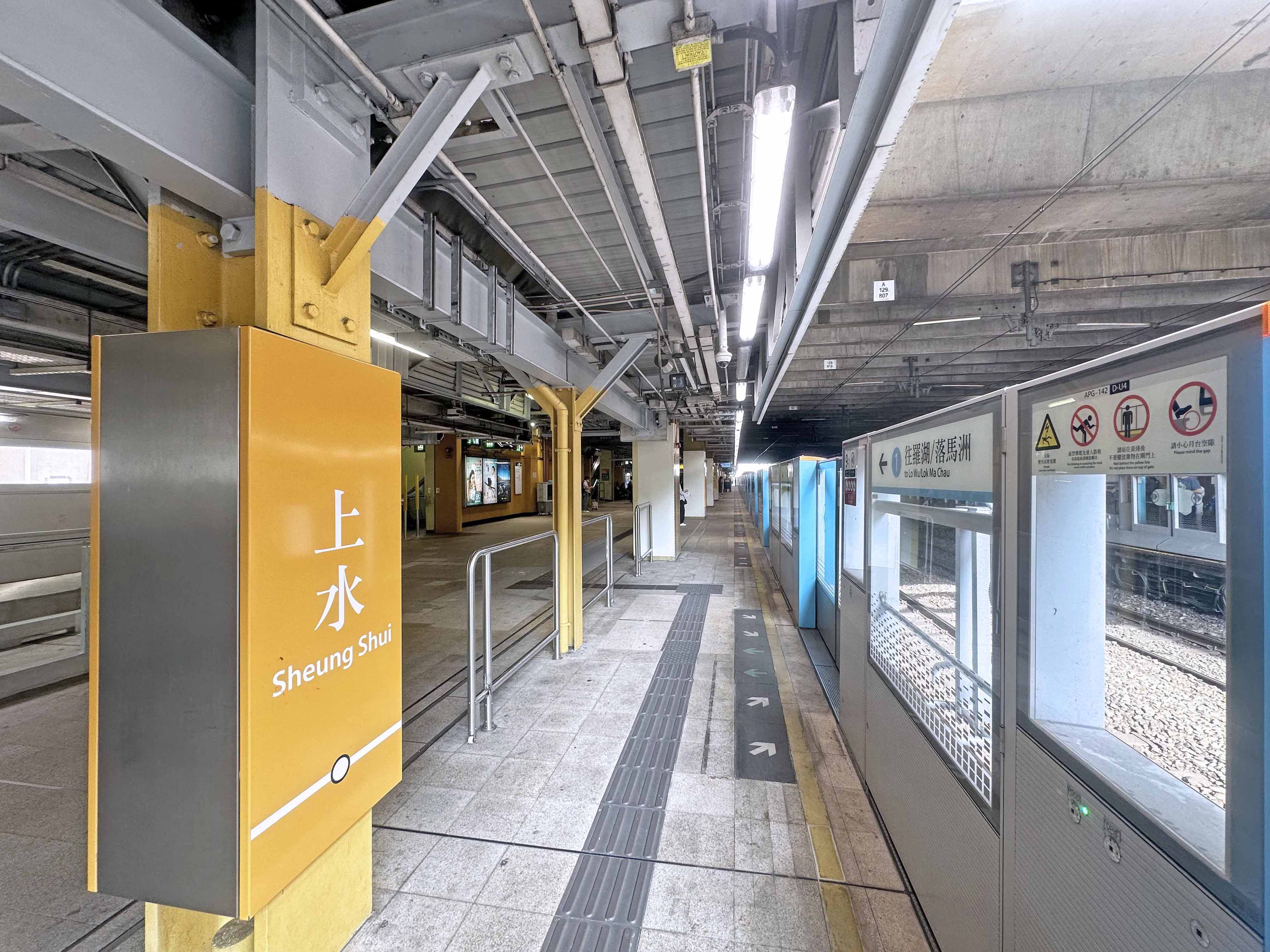
- Platforms 1 (November 2024)

Chinese name
- Chinese: 上水
- Jyutping: soeng^{6} seoi^{2}
- Cantonese Yale: Seuhngséui
Transcriptions
Standard Mandarin
- Hanyu Pinyin: Shàngshui
Yue: Cantonese
- Yale Romanization: Seuhngséui
- IPA: [sœŋ˨sɵɥ˧˥]
- Jyutping: soeng^{6} seoi^{2}

General information
- Location: San Wan Road, Sheung Shui; North District, Hong Kong
- Coordinates: 22°30′04″N 114°07′41″E
- System: MTR rapid transit station
- Owner: KCR Corporation
- Operator: MTR Corporation
- Line: East Rail line
- Platforms: 2 (2 side platforms)
- Tracks: 2
- Connections: Bus, minibus

Construction
- Structure type: At-grade
- Platform levels: 1
- Accessible: Yes

Other information
- Station code: SHS

History
- Opened: 16 May 1930; 96 years ago
- Electrified: 15 July 1983; 43 years ago

Services
Preceding station	MTR	Following station
Fanling towards Admiralty	East Rail line	Lo Wu Terminus
Fanling towards Admiralty	East Rail line	Lok Ma Chau Terminus
Future services (2027)
Fanling towards Admiralty	East Rail line	Kwu Tung towards Lok Ma Chau

Former services
Preceding station	KCR	Following station
Fanling towards Kowloon	KCR British section	Lo Wu Terminus
Track layout
Location
- Location within MTR

Sheung Shui (Chinese: 上水; Cantonese Yale: Seuhngséui; pronounced: [sœŋ˨.sɵɥ˧˥], literally "Above-water") is the penultimate northbound station on the East Rail line in Hong Kong. Its livery is gold. This station serves as the northern terminus of the East Rail line after the Lo Wu and Lok Ma Chau boundary crossings have closed for the day. It is also the last northbound station on the East Rail line that passengers without a Closed Area Permit, Mainland Travel Permit, or valid passport and mainland Chinese visa may freely travel to.

This station is located in the North District, New Territories, Hong Kong, serving the Sheung Shui area and its vicinity.

== History ==
On 1 October 1910, the Kowloon-Canton Railway British Section opened to the public, but the Sheung Shui station was not added until 16 May 1930. Full electrification of KCR completed on 15 July 1983.The Lok Ma Chau Spur Line was added on 15 August 2007.

In anticipation of an increase in patronage expected to accompany the commissioning of the Lok Ma Chau Spur Line, a new southern concourse was opened at Sheung Shui station in January 2006.

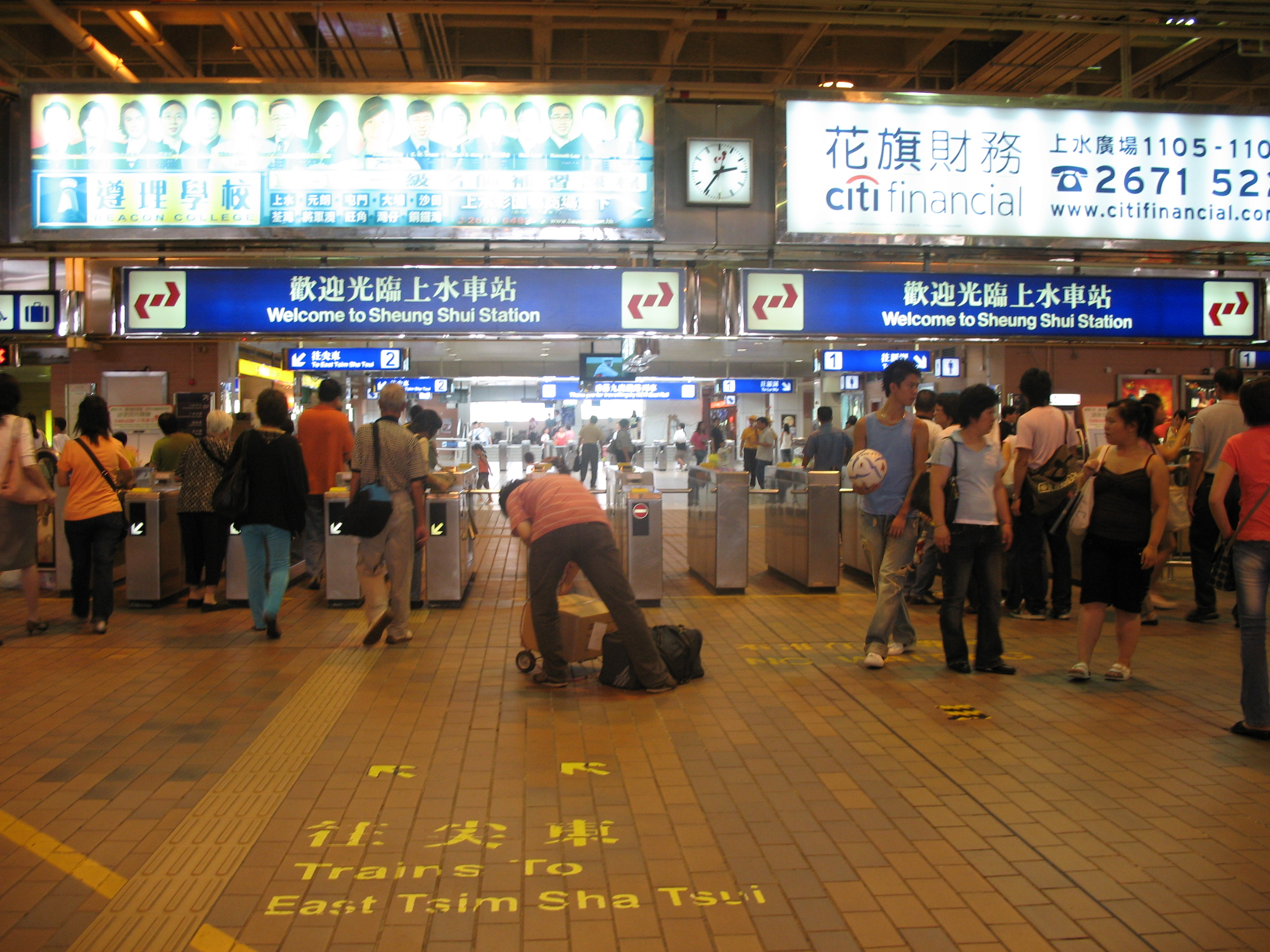
Former Sheung Shui station concourse, before refurbishment of Lok Ma Chau extension project (August 2006)

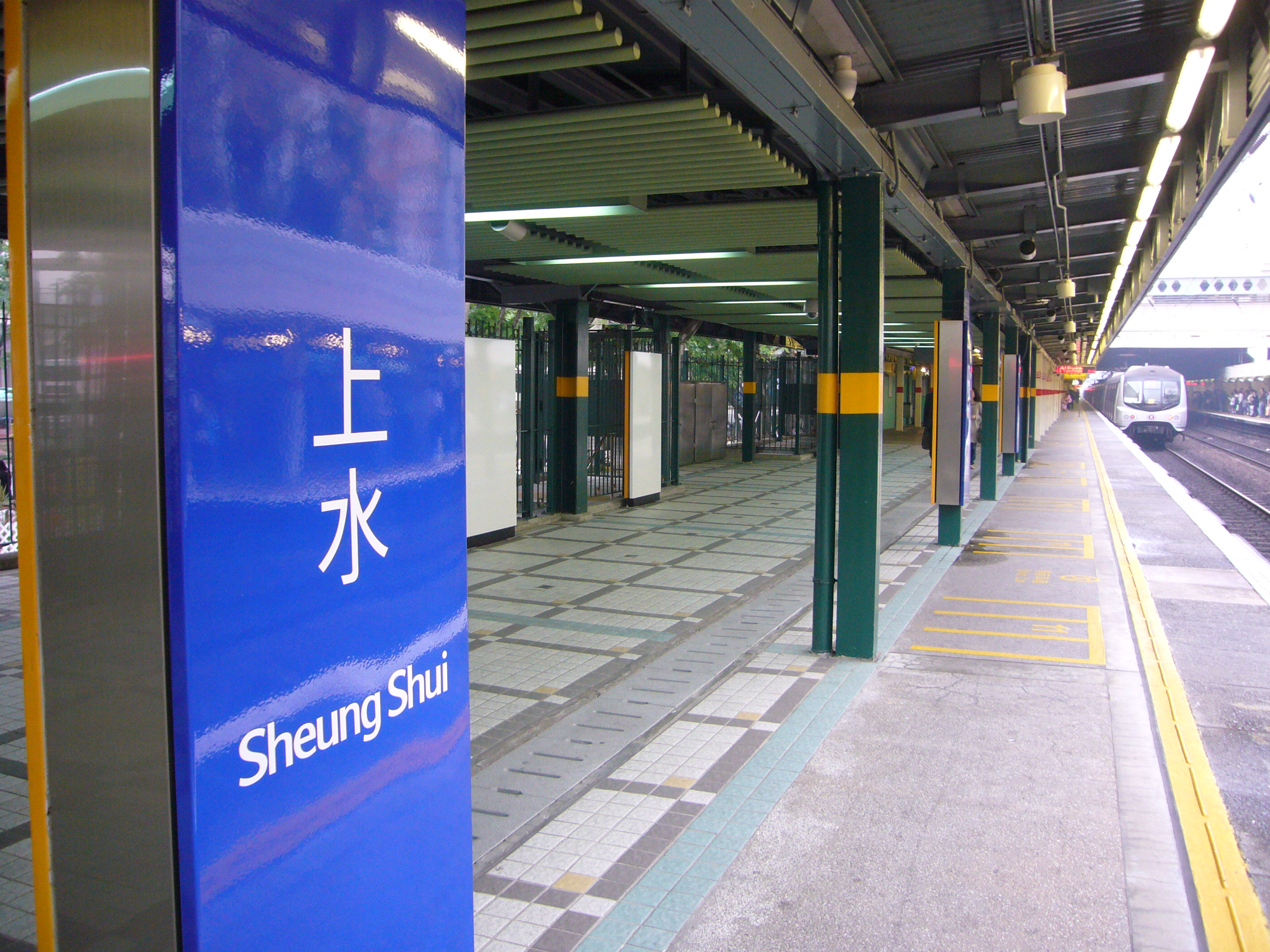
The extension of platform 2 with former KCR branded signage (April 2008)

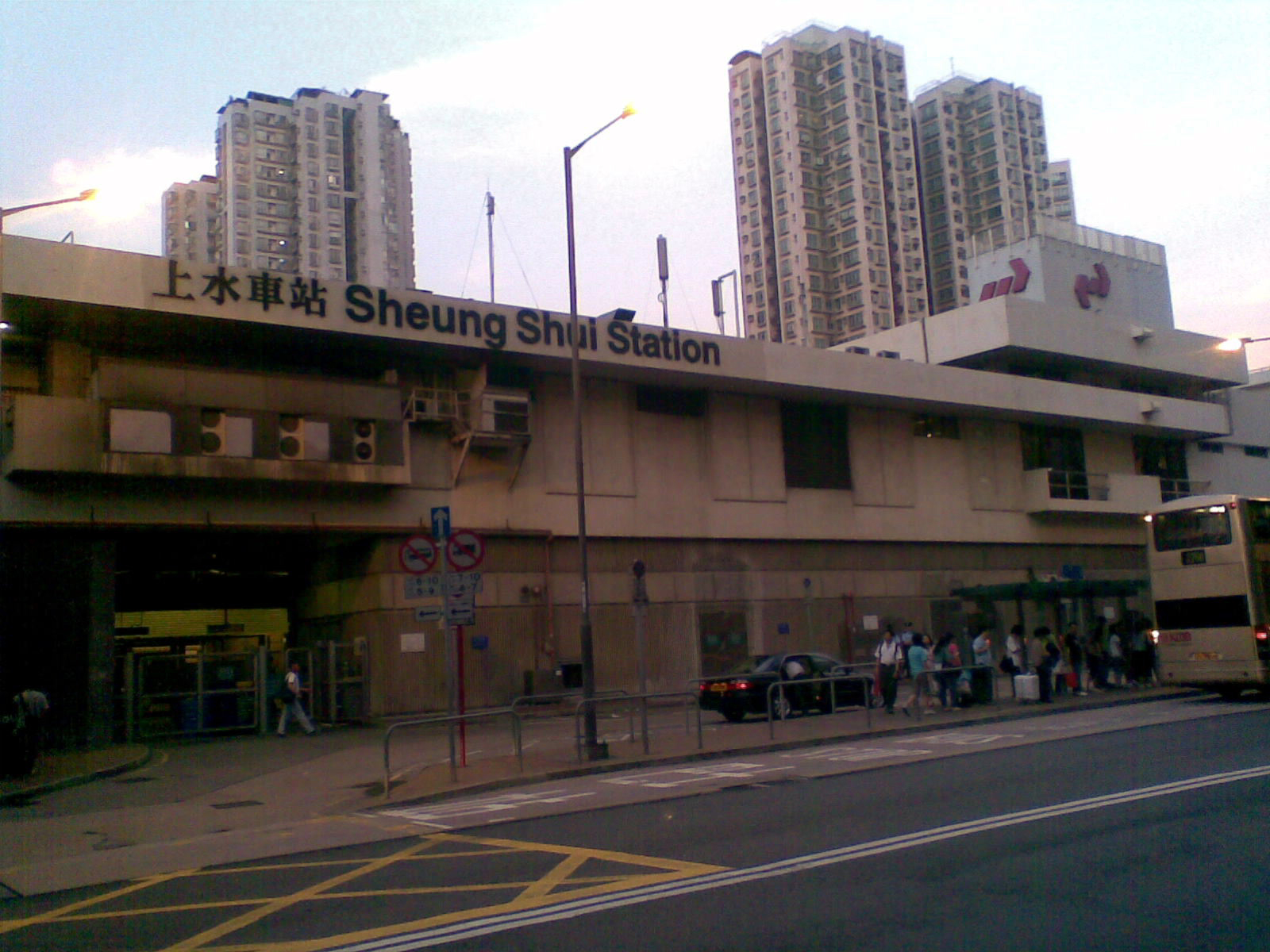
Exterior of the KCR Sheung Shui station (May 2007)

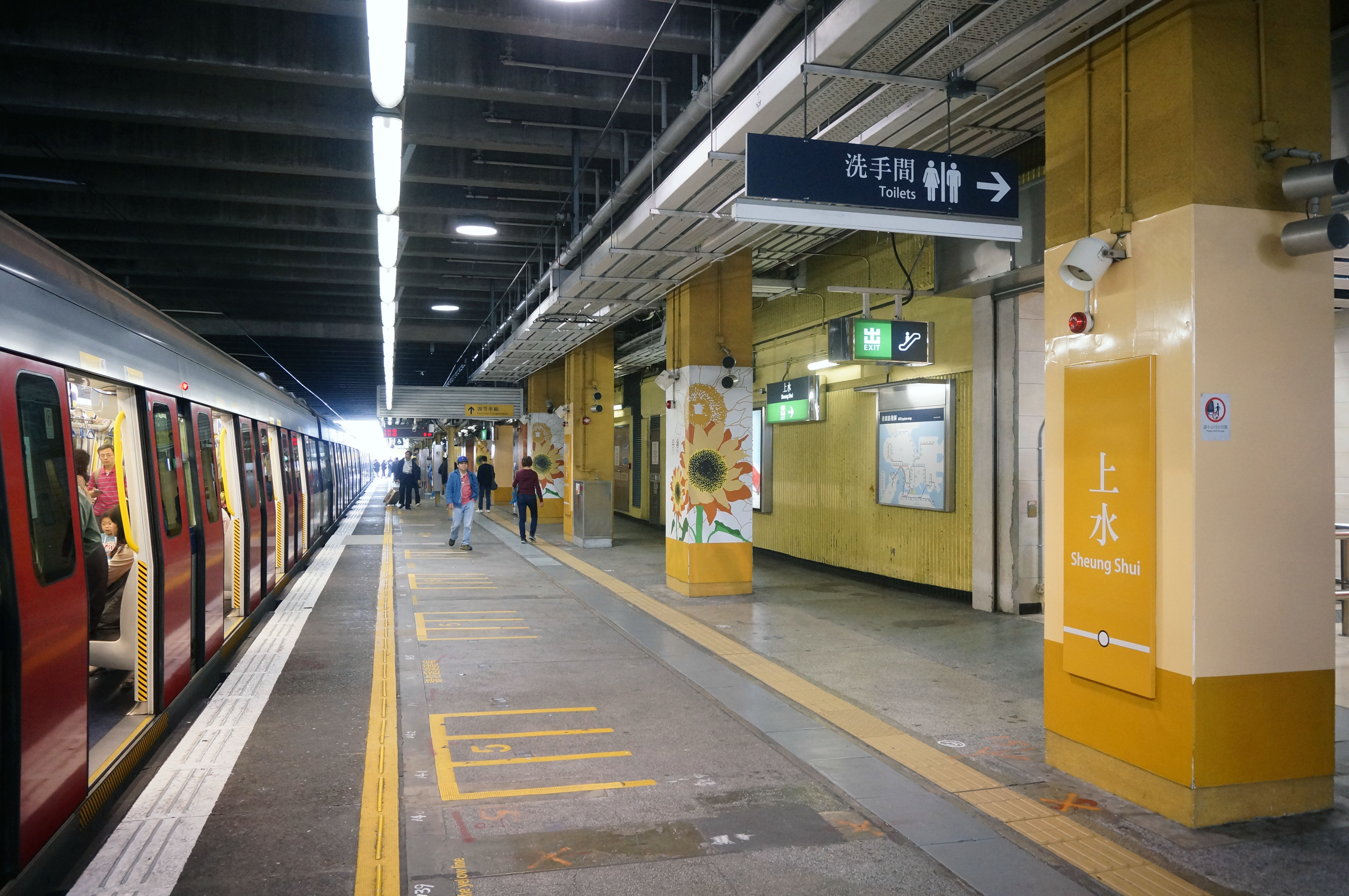
Platform 2 of Sheung Shui station (April 2014)

== Layout ==
Markers were provided on the northbound platform following the opening of Lok Ma Chau station. Two queues, blue and green, are set up at the boarding areas. The blue queues are for passengers travelling to Lo Wu, while the green queues are for those travelling to Lok Ma Chau. Platform 1 is the termination platform of northbound trains after Lo Wu and Lok Ma Chau boundary crossings have closed for the day, and so platform 2 (southbound platform) is the only platform for boarding.

U1	Concourse	Exits, customer service centre, shops, automatic teller machine
U1	Footbridge	footbridges to Landmark North, transport interchange, bus stops, Sheung Shui Garden, Yuk Po Court, Choi Yuen Commercial Complex
G
G	Exit C	Exit, customer service centre
G	Side platform, left doors open
G	Platform 1	East Rail line towards Lo Wu (terminus) → East Rail line towards Lok Ma Chau (terminus) →
G	Platform 2	← East Rail line towards Admiralty (Fanling)
G	Side platform, left doors open
G	Exit D	Exit, customer service centre

== Exits ==
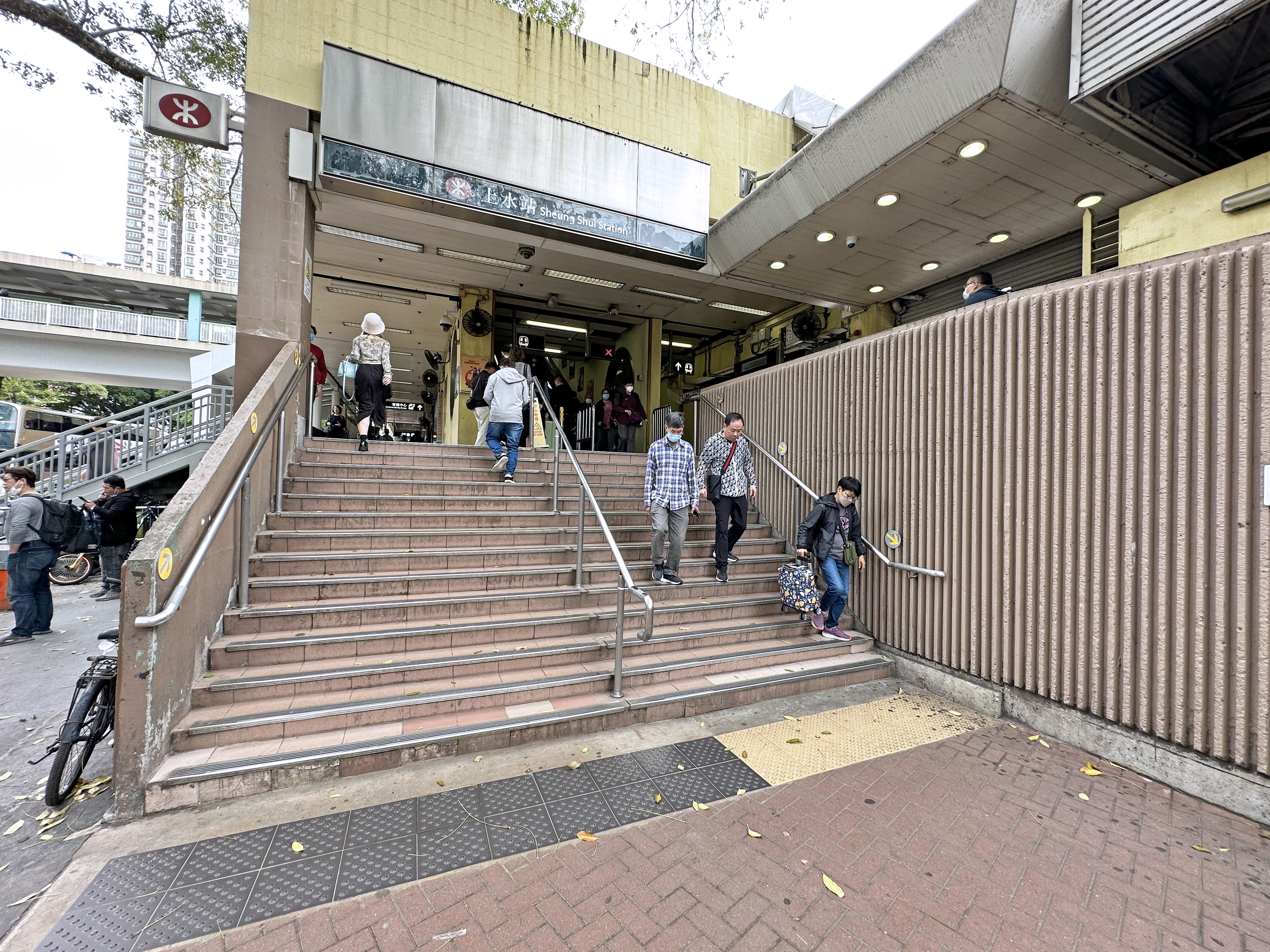
Exit A3

- Concourse (U1/F)
  - Exit A
    - A1: Choi Yuen Estate (footbridge)
    - A2: Choi Yuen Road, Platform 1 to Lo Wu (escalators)
    - A3: San Wan Road
    - A4: Transport interchange, bus terminal
  - Exit B
    - B1: San Wan Road, Shek Wu Hui (escalators)
    - B2: Landmark North (footbridge)
    - B3: Sheung Shui Centre (footbridge)
  - Exit E
    - E: Yuk Po Court, Tai Ping Estate, North District Hospital (footbridge)
  - Exit F
    - F: Sheung Shui Centre, Sheung Shui Town Centre, North District Town Hall (footbridge)
- Ground (G/F)
  - Exit C (connected to platform 1)
    - C: Choi Yuen Road
  - Exit D (connected to platform 2)
    - D1: San Wan Road, Shek Wu Hui, minibus terminus
    - D2: San Wan Road, residents' services bus stop
    - D3: San Wan Road

== Gallery ==
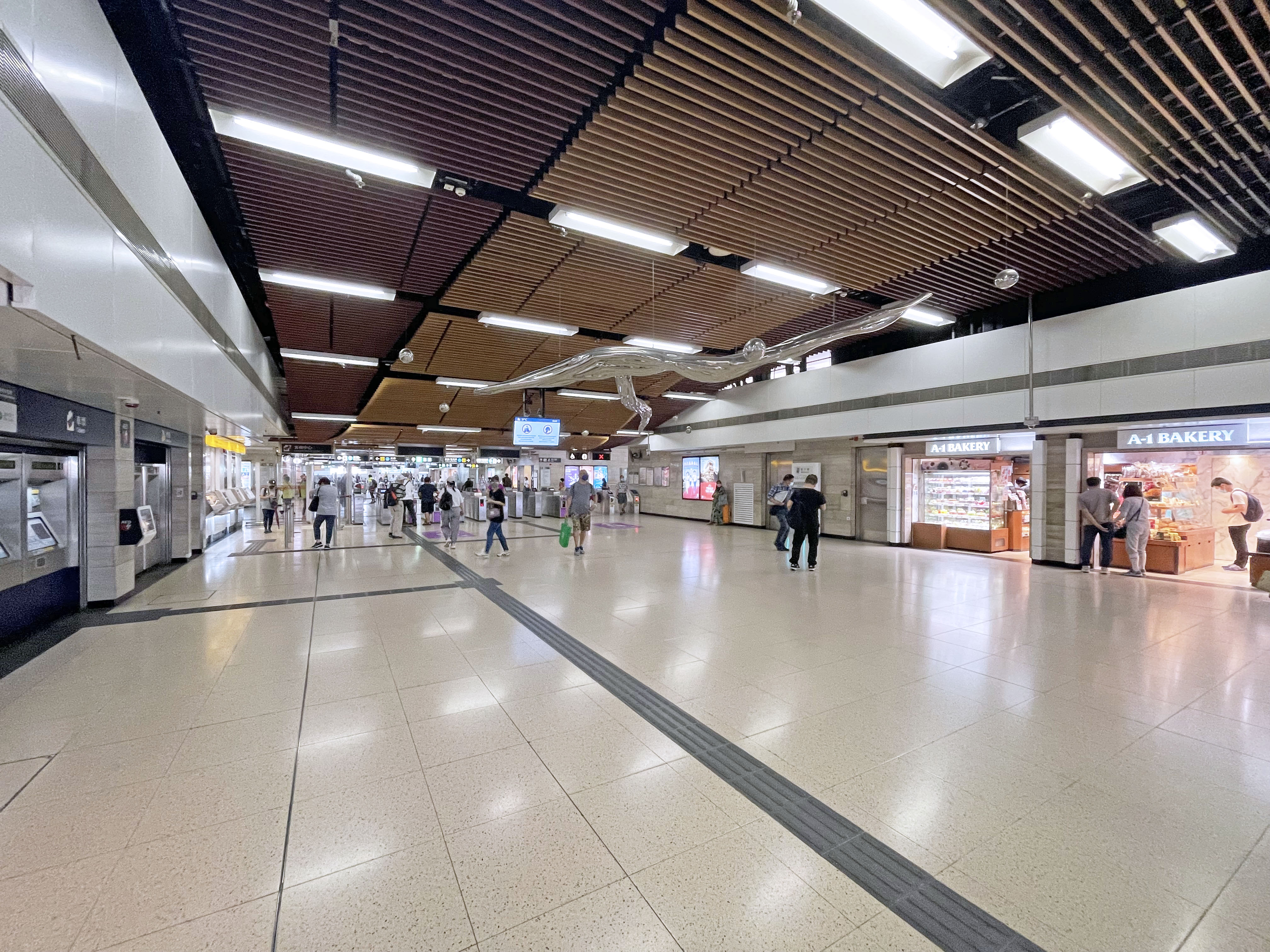
Unpaid area of the station concourse, near Exit A (2022)

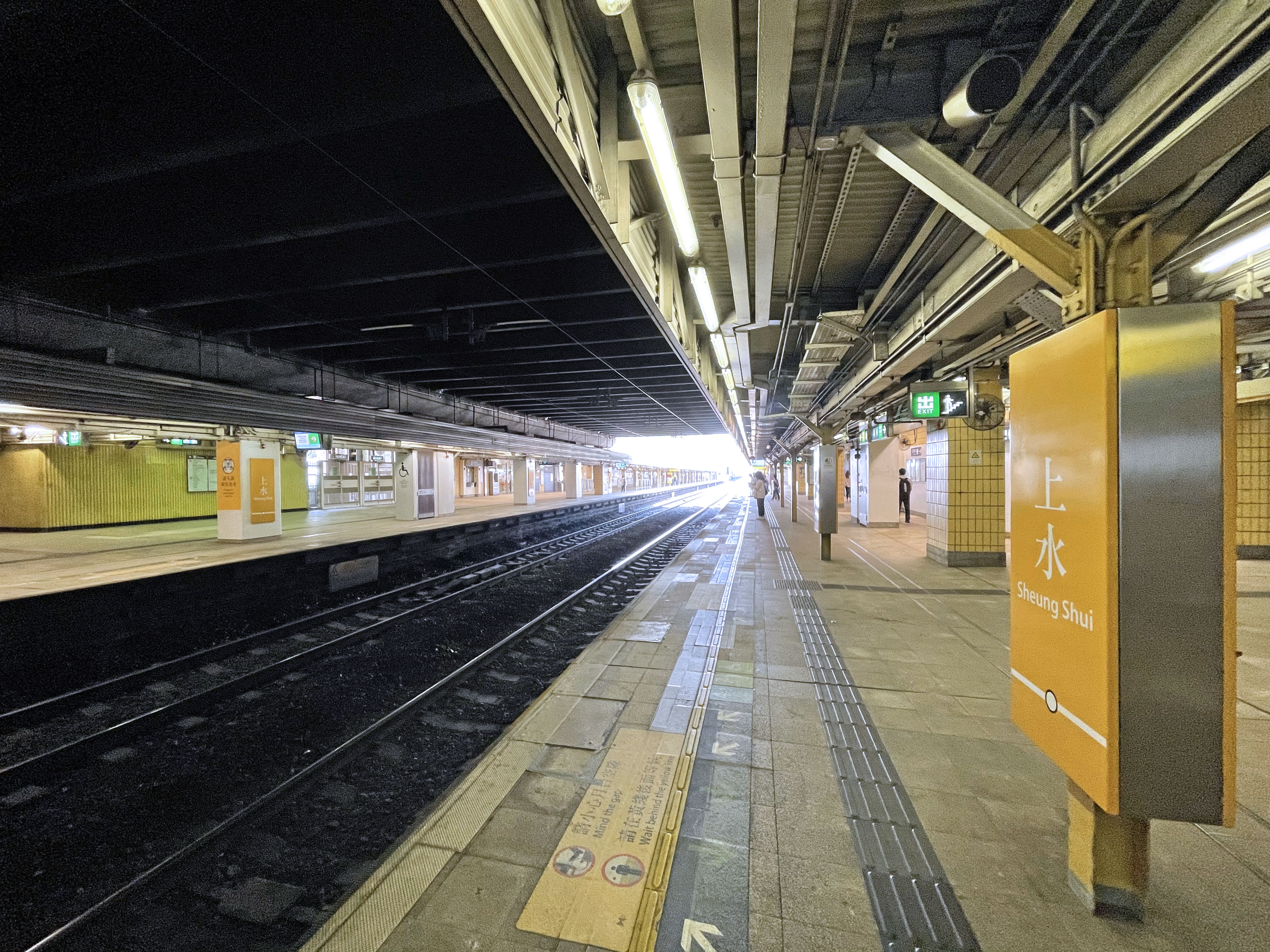
Platform (2021)

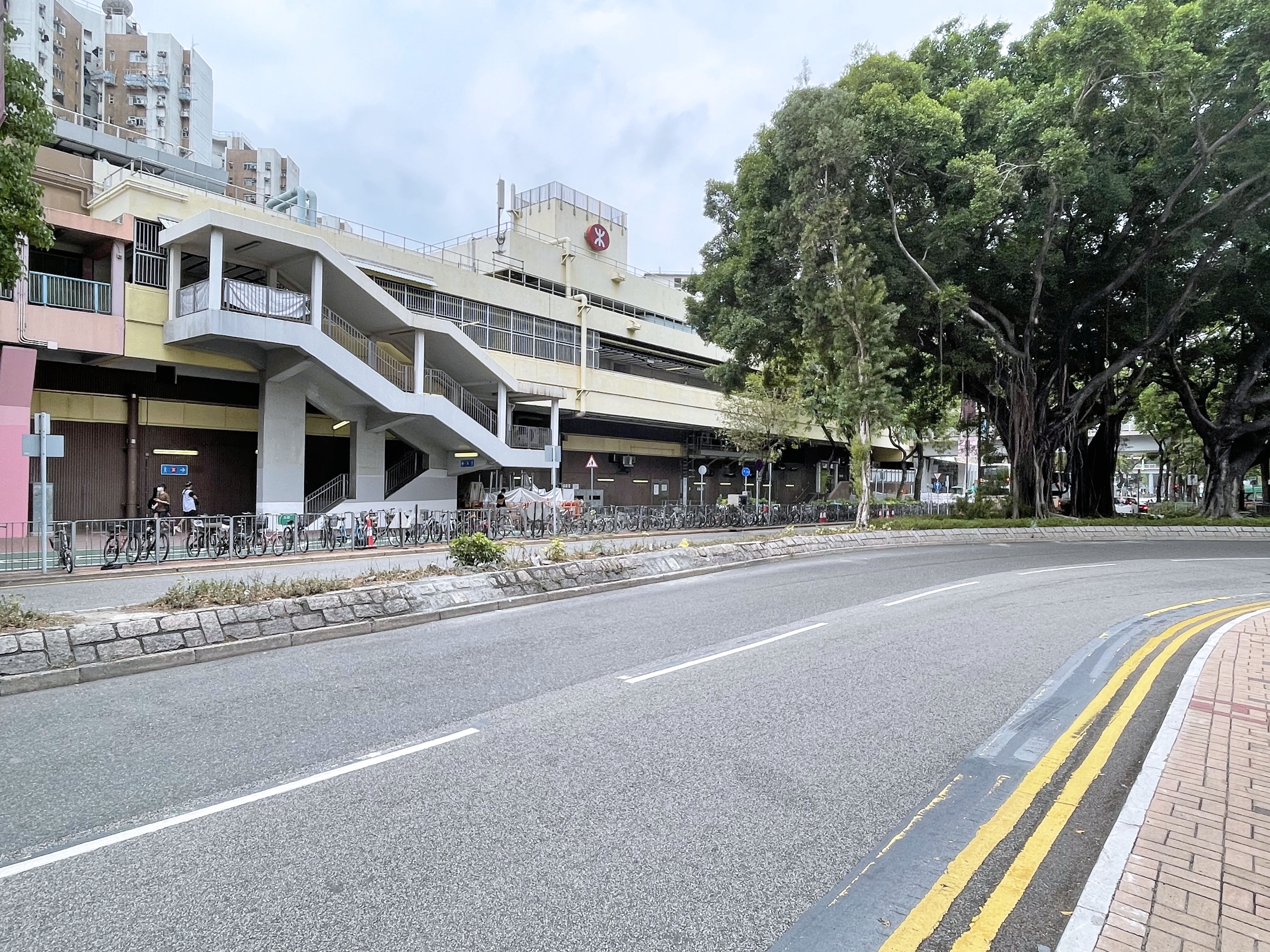
Station Exterior (2021)

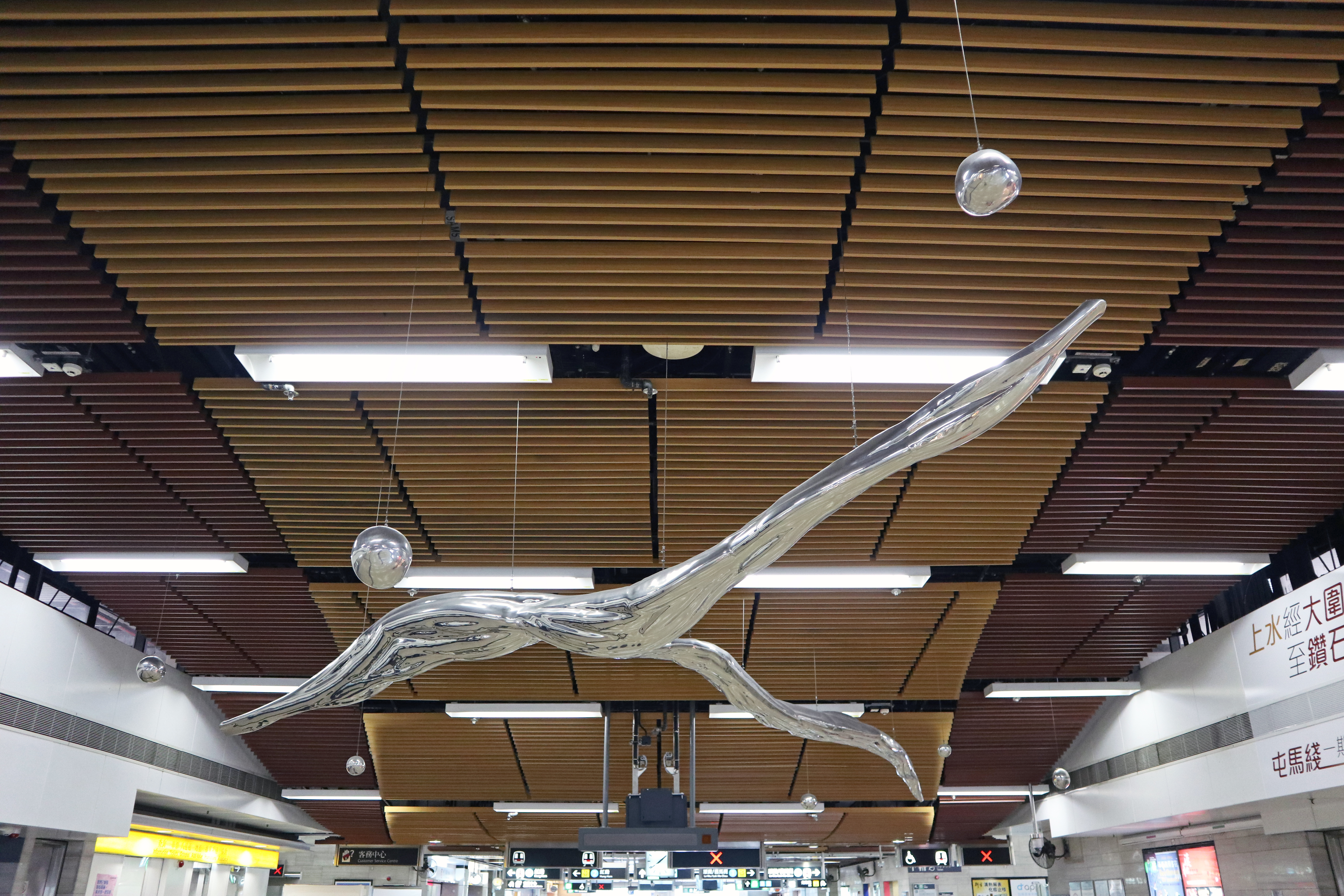
Concourse artwork (2020)
