= 大刀 =

大刀 (meaning "big blade") may refer to:

== Swords ==
- Dadao (大刀), a Chinese short sword, an alternate term for the dao (Chinese sword)
- Tachi (大刀), a Heian Era sword, a version of the chokutō (直刀), a Japanese straight sword
- Daitō (long sword) (大刀), the Japanese long sword classification, longer than 2 shaku (2 ft)
- Daitō (大刀), a type of Japanese wooden sword, a version of the shinai bamboo kendo sword

== People and characters ==
- Wang Zhengyi (王正谊; 1844–1900), nicknamed "Dadao Wang Wu" (大刀王五, Broadsword Wang-wu), Qing Dynasty Chinese martial artist
- Liu Ting, (nicknamed: 劉大刀, Liu Da-Dao, "Big Blade Liu"), a Ming Dynasty Chinese general; see List of military figures by nickname
- Wang Dadao (王大刀, Big Sword Wang), a Jin Dynasty admiral; see Military history of the Song dynasty

=== Characters ===
- Guan Sheng (nicknamed: "大刀", "Great Blade"), a fictional character from The Water Margin
- Hu Da-Dao (胡 大刀), a fictional character from the Taiwanese TV show Invincible Shan Bao Mei
- Daaihoi Jungwaang (nicknamed: 大刀; Da Dao), a fictional character from Warlord (manhua)

== Places ==
- Tai To Yan (大刀屻; Tai-to Hill), New Territories, Hong Kong; a mountain
- Pak Tai To Yan (北大刀屻; North Tai-to Hill), New Territories, Hong Kong; a mountain
- Dadaozhai (大刀寨; Dadao Fort), one of the Sichuan anti-Mongol fortresses in China

== Groups, organizations, companies ==
- Big Swords Society (大刀會; Dàdāo Huì), a late 19th-century to early 20th-century Chinese peasant militia organization
- Dadao Hui (大刀会; "Church of the Big Sword"), one of the Chinese salvationist religions

== Other uses ==
- Dadao (大刀), the sword discipline of Wushu (sport)
- Daikatana (videogame), a U.S. English language first-person-shooter 2000 videogame by John Romero from ION Storm, which uses "大刀" on its box cover

== See also ==
- Tachi (太刀), a Japanese sabre curved sword
- ōdachi (大太刀), a Japanese great sword
- Glossary of Japanese swords
- Types of swords
- The dictionary definition of 大 at Wiktionary
- The dictionary definition of 刀 at Wiktionary
- 刀 (disambiguation)
- 大
- Dadao (disambiguation)
- Daitō (disambiguation)
- Tachi (disambiguation)
- Taito (disambiguation)
