= Kai Kung Shan =

Kai Kung Shan (Chinese: 雞公山) is the name of several hills in Hong Kong:

- Kai Kung Shan (Sai Kung District) (399 metres (1,309 ft)) in Sai Kung District
- Kai Kung Shan (374 metres (1,227 ft)), part of the Kai Kung Leng range
- Kai Kung Shan (194 metres (636 ft)), a hill of southerwestern Lantau Island, directly west of Yi O (二澳)
