= Taito (disambiguation) =

Taito is a Japanese developer of video game software and arcade hardware.

Taito may also refer to:

== Places ==
Japan

- Taitō, a special ward located in Tokyo, Japan
- Taitō Station, a railway station in Japan

Taiwan

- Taitō Prefecture, administrative division of Taiwan under Japanese rule (now called Taitung County)
  - Taitung City, formerly Taitō City, the capital of the administrative division

Hong Kong

- Tai To Yan (大刀屻; Tai-to Hill), New Territories, Hong Kong; a mountain
- Pak Tai To Yan (北大刀屻; North Tai-to Hill), New Territories, Hong Kong; a mountain

== Other uses ==
- Taito of Brazil, a former Brazilian subsidiary for pinball machines
- Taito, also known as matai, paramount chiefs according to Fa'a Samoa
- Taito (kanji), the 84-stroke Japanese character
- Taito (harvestman), a genus of harvestmen in the family Cosmetidae

== See also ==
- 大刀 (disambiguation); sometimes rendered as "taito" or "taitō"
- Tayto (disambiguation)
- Daitō (disambiguation)
