= Tato =

Tato may refer to:

== People ==
- Tato (name), a list of people with the given name, nickname, stagename or surname
- Tato, King of the Lombards (died 510)
- Tato (footballer, born 1961) (Carlos Alberto Araújo Prestes, 1961–2026), Brazilian footballer
- Tato (footballer, born 1979) (José Antonio García Escudero, born 1979), Spanish footballer
- Tato (footballer, born 1992) (Luis Alberto Díez Ocerín, born 1992), Spanish footballer

== Other uses ==
- Tato Awards, Argentinian television awards
- Tato, a 1980s Spanish comics character - see Chicha, Tato y Clodoveo
- Tato, Arunachal Pradesh, India, a census town
- Potato, sometimes called a "tato"

== See also ==
- Villa El Tato, an urban fragment in the Canelones Department of southern Uruguay
- Tayto (disambiguation)
- Teto (disambiguation)
