= Tito (disambiguation) =

Josip Broz Tito (1892–1980) was a Yugoslav communist revolutionary and statesman.

Tito may also refer to:

== People ==
=== Mononyms ===
- Roberto Arias (1918–1989), aka Tito, Panamanian international lawyer, diplomat, and journalist
- John Gerassi (1931–2012), aka Tito or Tito Gerassi, French-American Marxist professor, journalist, author, scholar, and political activist
- Tito (footballer, born 1943), full name Nílton Rosa, Brazilian football forward
- Terry Francona (born 1959), nicknamed Tito after his father, baseball manager with Cleveland Guardians
- Tito (footballer, born 1946), full name Tito José da Costa Santos, Portuguese footballer
- Tito (footballer, born 1980), full name Bruno Miguel Areias de Sousa, Portuguese footballer
- Tito (footballer, born May 1985), full name Alberto Ortiz Moreno, Spanish footballer
- Tito (footballer, born July 1985), full name Roberto Román Triguero, Spanish footballer

=== Family name ===
- Dennis Tito (born 1940), American businessman and astronaut
- Diego Quispe Tito (1611–1681), Peruvian painter
- Ettore Tito (1859–1941), Italian painter
- Paul Tito (born 1978), New Zealand rugby player
- Raúl Tito (born 1997), Peruvian footballer
- Santi di Tito (1536–1603), Italian Mannerist painter
- Teburoro Tito (born 1952), Kiribati president

=== Given name ===
==== A–L ====
- Tito Alonso (1926–1979), Argentine film actor
- Tito Arévalo (1911–2000), Filipino actor and musician
- Tito Auger (born 1968), Puerto Rican musician
- Tito El Bambino (born 1981), reggaeton musician
- Tito Beltrán (born 1965), Chilean tenor
- Tito Benady (1930–2026), Gibraltarian historian
- Tito Capobianco (1931–2018), Argentine stage and opera director
- Tito Chingunji, Angolan UNITA rebel foreign secretary
- Tito Colón (born 1982), Puerto Rican professional wrestler
- Tito Francona (born 1933), former American outfielder/first baseman in Major League Baseball
- Tito Fuentes (born 1944), Cuban-American second baseball player
- Tito Fuentes, guitarist with Mexican rock and hip hop band Molotov
- Tito Gobbi (1913–1984), Italian baritone
- Tito Guízar (1908–1999), Mexican singer and actor
- Tito Gómez (disambiguation), several people
  - Tito Gómez (Cuban singer) (1920–2000), Cuban singer
  - Tito Gómez (Puerto Rican singer) (1948–2007), Puerto Rican singer
  - Tito Gómez (painter) (born 1948), Cuban painter
- Tito Horford (born 1966), Dominican professional basketball player
- Tito Jackson (1953–2024), musician, member of the Jackson 5
- Tito Karnavian (born 1964), Indonesian national police chief
- Tito Kayak (born 1958), Puerto Rican environmental activist
- Tito Landrum (born 1954), baseball player
- Tito Larriva (born 1953), Mexican-American singer, musician and actor

==== M–Z ====
- Tito Maddox (born 1981), American professional basketball player formerly in the NBA
- Tito Mboweni (born 1959), the eighth Governor of the South African Reserve Bank
- Tito Minniti (1909–1935), Italian pilot and murder victim
- Tito Munoz, also known as Tito the Builder from the 2008 United States presidential election
- Tito Muñoz (born 1983), American conductor
- Tito Nieves (born 1959), Puerto-Rico American, one of the leading Salsa singers of the 1980s and early 90s
- Tito Okello (1914–1996), Ugandan general
- Tito Ortiz (born 1975), mixed martial arts competitor
- Tito Perdue (born 1938), Alabamian novelist
- Tito Puente (1923–2000), Latin jazz musician
- Tito Rodríguez (1923–1973), band-leader
- Tito Rojas (1955–2020), salsa band-leader
- Tito Santana (born 1953), Tejano professional wrestler
- Tito Sarrocchi (1824–1900), Italian sculptor
- Tito Schipa (1888–1965), Italian tenor
- Tito Sotto (born 1948), senator in the Philippines Congress, actor and singer
- Tito Steiner (born 1952), Argentine decathlete
- Tito Tebaldi (born 1987), Italian rugby union player
- Tito Traversa (2001–2013), Italian mountain climber
- Tito Trinidad (born 1973, Félix Trinidad), Puerto Rican professional boxer
- Tito Vilanova (1968–2014), Spanish football player and manager

=== Fictional characters ===
- Tito Bohusk, a fictional mutant character in the Marvel Comics Universe
- Tito Makani, a character on Rocket Power
- Tito Dick, a character in the animated series The Nutshack
- Tito (Oliver & Company), a Chihuahua in Disney's Oliver & Company
- Tito Swing, a member of the Jukebox puppet band on Shining Time Station

== Arts and entertainment ==
- Tito (miniseries), a 2010 Croatian documentary miniseries about Josip Broz Tito
- Tito (1977 film), a Yugoslav documentary film
- Tito (2004 film), an Egyptian action film
- Tito (2019 film), a Canadian drama film

== Places ==
- Tito, Basilicata, town in the province of Potenza, Italy

== See also ==
- TITO (disambiguation)
