= Daitō =

Daitō may refer to:

- Daitō (long sword)
- An alternate reading of the 84-stroke Japanese character taito

== People and characters ==
- Masaaki Daito (大塔 正明; born 1973), Japanese baseball player
- Toshiro Yoshiaki, a character in Ready Player One whose OASIS persona is Daito

== Places ==
- Daitō Islands, Okinawa
- Daitō, Osaka, Japan
- Daitō Station, railway station in Sasebo, Japan
- Former name of Daejeon during Japanese colonialism

=== Former towns ===
- Daitō, Iwate, Japan
- Daitō, Shimane, Japan
- Daitō, Shizuoka, Japan

== Other uses ==
- A tahōtō whose base measures 5x5 ken

== See also ==
- 大刀 (disambiguation), sometimes rendered as "daitō"
- Taito (disambiguation)
