= Tito Gómez =

Tito Gómez may refer to:

- Tito Gómez (Cuban singer) (1920–2000)
- Tito Gómez (Puerto Rican singer) (1948–2007), Puerto Rican salsa singer
- Tito Gómez (painter) (born 1953), Cuban-born painter
