= Tato (name) =

Tato is a given name, nickname and surname used independently in Romance languages and Georgian. Notable persons with the name include:

== Given name ==
- Tato, King of the Lombards (died 510), king of the Lombards
- Tato Grigalashvili (born 1999), Georgian judoka
- Tato Taborda (born 1960), Brazilian composer, pianist and teacher

== Nickname or stage name ==
- Tato Bores, stage name of Mauricio Borensztein (1927–1996), Argentinian film, theatre and television comedian
- Tato Cifuentes (1925–2017), Chilean-born Argentine actor, singer and ventriloquist
- Tato Gabus Mendes, Brazilian actor Luís Otávio Gabus Mendes (born 1958)
- Tato Laviera (1950–2013), Puerto Rican poet and activist
- Jaume Morales Moltó (born 1973), player of Valencian pilota
- Luis León Rodríguez (born 1966), Puerto Rican politician
- Pablo Sebastián Rodríguez (born 1978), Argentine former basketball player

== Surname ==
- Anna Maria Tatò (1940–2022), Italian film director
- Assunção Tato (born 1963), Portuguese soccer player
- Eloy Tato Losada (1923–2022), Spanish-born Colombian prelate of the Roman Catholic Church
- Franco Tatò (1932–2022), Italian businessman
- Jesús Tato (born 1983), Spanish professional footballer
- Manuel Tato (1907–1980), prelate of the Roman Catholic Church

== See also ==
- Andreas Tatos (born 1989), Greek footballer
