= Dadaocheng (disambiguation) =

Dadaocheng is a neighborhood in Datong District, Taipei, Taiwan.

Dadaocheng may also refer to:

- Dadaocheng Wharf, a wharf in Dadaocheng, Datong, Taipei, Taiwan

== See also ==
- Dadao (disambiguation)
