= Lam Tsuen Country Park =

Country park in Hong Kong

Coordinates: 22°28′05″N 114°05′58″E

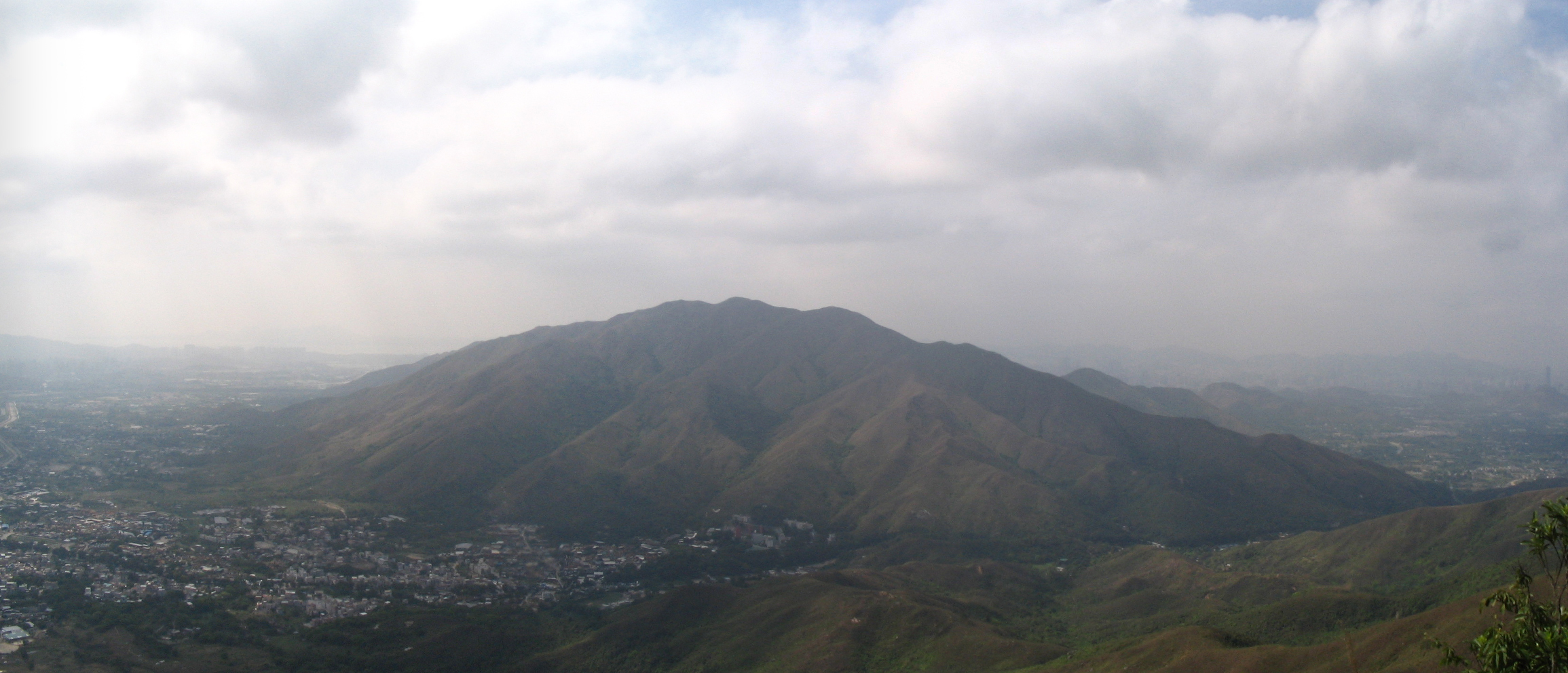
View of Kai Kung Leng

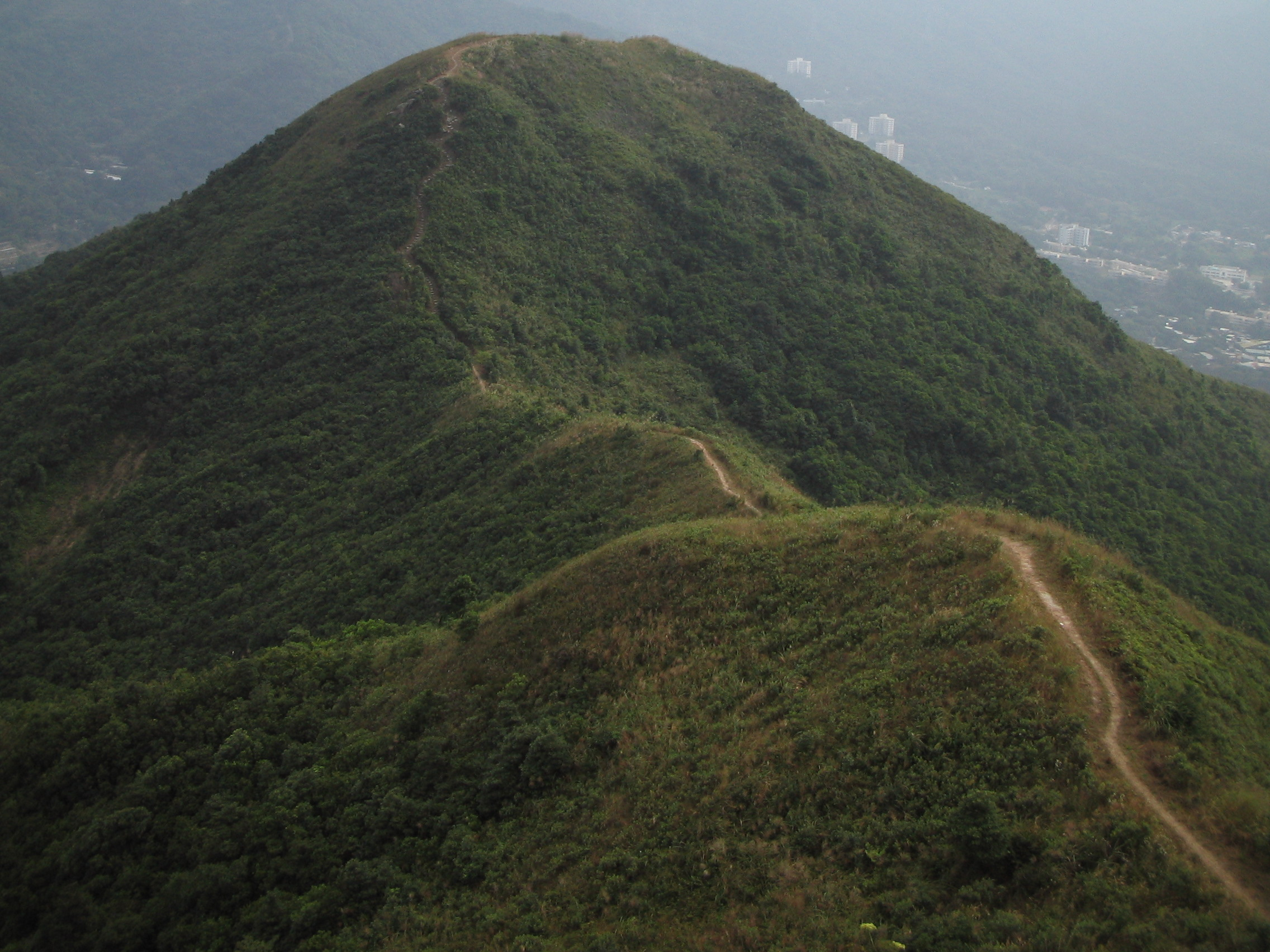
Tai To Yan

Lam Tsuen Country Park (Chinese: 林村郊野公園) is a 15.20 km^{2} (5.87 sq mi) country park in the northern New Territories, Hong Kong.

It opened in 1979 and spans parts of Tai Po, Fanling and Yuen Long. The park is divided into two parts by Fan Kam Road: Tai To Yan (大刀屻) and Kai Kung Leng (雞公嶺).

== Features include ==
- Yuen Long Plain
- Lam Tsuen Valley
- Sam Tin
- Liying School

== Peaks include ==
Kai Kung Leng Range:

- Lo Tin Deng (585 m)
- Tai Lo Tin aka Kai Kung Leng and formerly aka Kwai Kok Shan (572 m)
- Kai Kung Shan (374 m)

Tai To Yan Range:

- Tai To Yan (566 m)
- Pak Tai To Yan (480 m)

== See also ==
- Conservation in Hong Kong
