= Kai Kung Leng =

Mountain range in New Territories, Hong Kong

- 雞公嶺
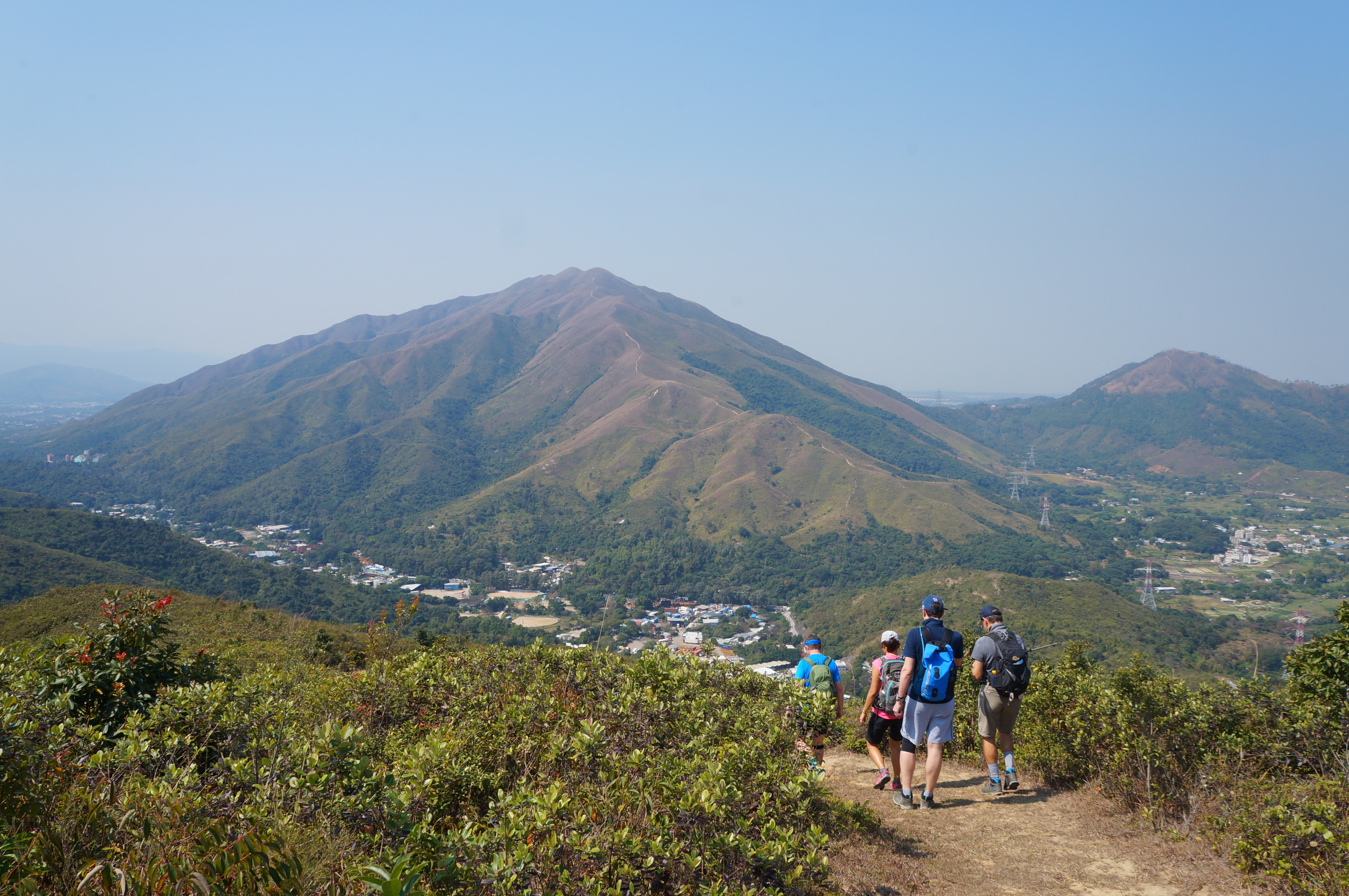
- View of Kai Kung Leng, Lam Tsuen Country Park, HK

Highest point
- Elevation: 585 m (1,919 ft); HKPD
- Coordinates: 22°27′50.63″N 114°5′7.98″E

Geography
- Location within Hong Kong
- Location: Lam Tsuen Country Park, Hong Kong

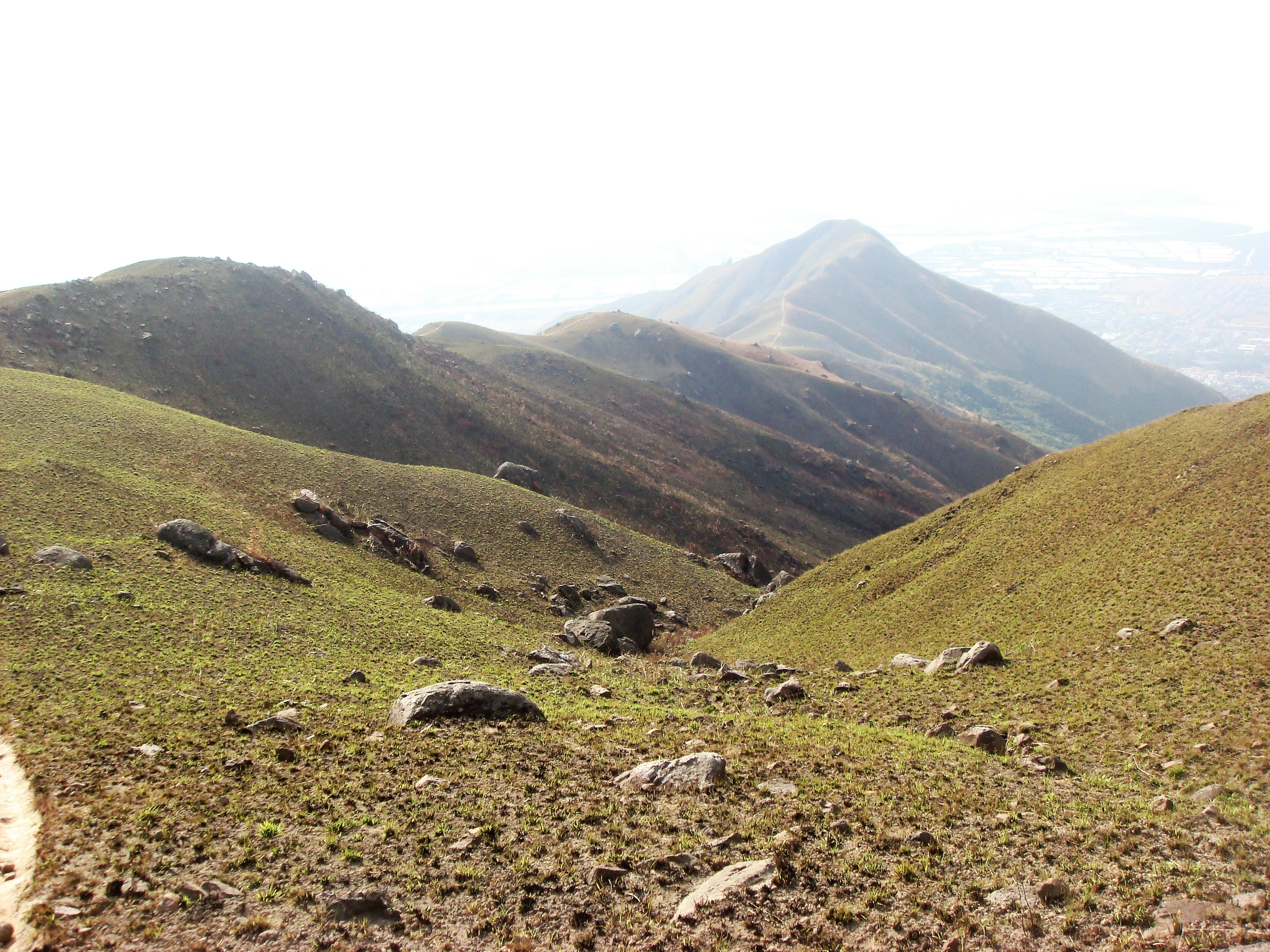
Kai Kung Leng

Kai Kung Leng (Chinese: 雞公嶺; lit. 'Rooster Ridge') is a mountain range in Lam Tsuen Country Park, New Territories, Hong Kong.

== Geography ==
There are several peaks on this mountain range. The tallest peak on the Kai Kung Leng mountain range is called Lo Tin Teng and is 585 metres (1,919 ft) above sea level. Nearby, a peak simply called Kai Kung Leng, with the summit-signalling trigonometric post, stands at 572 metres (1,877 ft). Slightly further away to the west, a subpeak called Kai Kung Shan is 374 metres (1,227 ft) tall.

== List of selected peaks ==
- Lo Tin Teng (羅天頂) (585 metres (1,919 ft))
- Kai Kung Leng, as known as Tai Lo Tin (大羅天) or formerly Kwai Kok Shan (572 metres (1,877 ft))
- Lung Tam Shan (龍潭山) (550 metres (1,804 ft))
- Kai Kung Shan (雞公山) (374 metres (1,227 ft))
- Ngau Tam Shan (牛潭山) (337 metres (1,106 ft))
- Kei Lun Shan (麒麟山) (222 metres (728 ft))

== Disambiguation ==
In Hong Kong, there are other similarly named mountains in different regions of the city, such as Kai Kung Shan (399 m) in Sai Kung West Country Park and another Kai Kung Leng in Kat O (122 m). These locations are all popular hiking spots, so one must plan correctly when visiting.

== Illegal Motorcycle activity ==
In recent years, various media have reported some motocross bike users have been illegally biking on Kai Kung Leng, making the hillside completely into a piece of bare ground with intensified soil erosion, and knocking down some ancestral graves of indigenous villagers.

== See also ==
- List of mountains, peaks and hills in Hong Kong
- Lam Tsuen Country Park
