= TITO =

TITO may refer to:

- Ticket-In, Ticket-Out, a type of cashless slot machine
- Thug in Thug Out, an album by Young Noble and Hussein Fatal

== See also ==
- Tito
