= 劍 =

劍 (Japanese simplified form 剣, Chinese simplified form 剑), the Chinese character for "double edged sword", may refer to:

- Jian (劍, 剑)
- Tsurugi (sword) (剣)
- Korean sword (검, 劍)
- Shinken (真剣)
- Bokken (木剣)
- Ninjaken (忍者剣)
- Kaiken (dagger) (懐剣)
- Shuriken (手裏剣)
- Kenjutsu (剣術)
- Kendo (剣道)
- Kumdo (劍道)

== See also ==
- 刀 (disambiguation)
- 儉 (jiǎn; "temperate, moderate, frugal, economical")
