= Teto (disambiguation) =

Kasane Teto (重音テト) is a virtual singer software.

Teto may also refer to:

- Teto (footballer) (born 2001), Spanish football winger
- Teto the Clown, a puppet created by Hazelle Hedges Rollins
- Teto (テト), a character in Nausicaä of the Valley of the Wind

== See also ==
- Tito (disambiguation)
