= Tayto =

Tayto may refer to:

- Tayto (Republic of Ireland), a major Irish crisps and popcorn manufacturer
- Tayto (Northern Ireland), a Northern Irish manufacturer of crisps and corn snacks
- An Irish synonym for potato crisps

== See also ==
- Taito (disambiguation)
- Tato (disambiguation)
