= Dadao =

Dadao, formerly romanized ta-tao, may refer to:

- Dadao (sword) (大刀, p dàdāo, lit. 'big knife'), a machete-like variety of the Chinese sword dao
  - "The Sword March", a Chinese song during the Second Sino-Japanese War (World War II) that begins Dadao!
- Tao, the "Great Way" (大道, p Dàdào) of Chinese philosophies and religions
  - The Great Way Government of Shanghai (1937–38) during the early stages of the Second Sino-Japanese War (World War II)

== See also ==
- Dadaocheng (disambiguation)
