= Assunção Tato =

Portuguese footballer (born 1963)

Personal information
- Full name: Maria da Assunção Tato
- Date of birth: 29 December 1963 (age 62)
- Position: Defender

Senior career*
Years	Team	Apps	(Gls)
- Leixões
1981–1985	Boavista		

International career
1981–1983	Portugal	7	(1)
- * Club domestic league appearances and goals

Maria da Assunção Tato (born 29 December 1963) is a Portuguese professional footballer who played as a defender for Boavista and the Portugal women's national team. She scored the first goal for the Portugal national team.
