= Warlord (manhua) =

- Cover of the first issue

武神 Wargod
- Genre: Action/adventure, romance, science fiction
- Author: Wan Yuet Lung
- Illustrator: Tang Chi Fai
- Publisher: Ocean Creative Company Limited (Hong Kong 1999)
- Other publishers: nxb Trẻ (Vietnam 2007)
- Volumes: 300 issues

Warlord (Chinese: 武神; Jyutping: Mou5 San4; Sidney Lau: Mo^{5} San^{4}; lit. 'God of War') is the manhua comics written by Wan Yuet Lung and illustrated by Tang Chi Fai (鄧志輝).

== Plot ==
In the year 7067AD, the earth experienced numerous battles, and because of these wars the world population was reduced to 500,000 people. Many cultural relics disappeared, the raw materials for making weapons has run out 1000 years after Baak Saunaam died and people only respect the strength of the Wargods to protect them. The Wargods are not only on Earth but on the Moon, Mars, and Saturn as well.

During this time, the extremely talented are called Wargods. Wargods who lose to any other Wargod will be taken races, so those who aren't under the protection of Wargods, or can't request the favour of Wargods, put the hope in the book of legend written 5000 years ago. No one understands the words written in the book, they only know the spell of the book is Deiyukdou (Chinese: 地獄道; lit. 'Hell Way'). In spite of the lack of understanding, the writing's rumor is transmitted generation to generation .

Because of knowing Mou Naam of the Fung tribe, the Wargod Ming Dou knows how to read the book, so the Wargod Saam-ngaan of the Three-Eyes tribe has been trying to kill Mou Naam. This is the start of the battle between the Good and Evil Wargods.

This is a truth that even a deity can not change - no one can change, because the nature of life is this: that Good and Evil always coexist, and when a conflict is resolved, other conflicts appear.

== Characters ==
=== The Earth ===
(Chinese: 大地; Jyutping: Daaidei; lit. 'Great Land')

==== Baak Imperial Family ====
(Chinese: 白家皇族; Jyutping: Baakgawongjuk; lit. 'Baak Family', 'the Imperial Clan')

- Title of wargods is Hoifu (Chinese: 海虎; lit. 'Sea Tiger'). The warlord owns the Eastern and Western Sea.

- Baak Sau (Chinese: 白 愁): The 270th Emperor of the Earth. He was later killed by his son Mou Naam.
- Syutfei (Chinese: 雪妃): The official wife of Sau.
- Baak Mounaam (Chinese: 白 武男): Formerly Mou Naam, the guardian of Fung Tribe. The first son of Baak Sau. Initially born and respected for his good virtues, in the later episodes of the storyline, Mounaam turned into a supervillain, following a sudden switch of personality after discovering his full combat potential. The strength of his split personality was so strong, that he even managed to be resurrected even after his death (following a duel with Daaihoi Jungwaang).
- Baak Batji (Chinese: 白 不二): The second son of Baak Sau. He is the son born by Syutfei. He was later betrayed and killed by his half brother Mou Naam.
- Leui Ou (Chinese: 雷 奧): The most powerful guardian of Baak Sau, and his younger cousin. His wargod title is Mouseung (Chinese: 無相).
- Baak Titkyun (Chinese: 白 鐵拳): The second elder brother of Baak Sau. His title is his name Titkyun.
- Leui King (Chinese: 雷 鯨): The elder brother of Leui Ou, also a loyalist general of Baak family. His wargod title is Saatking (Chinese: 殺鯨; lit. 'Killer whale'). He is the warlord of Northern Sea.
- Baak Loubou (Chinese: 白 路): The fourth elder brother of Sau. He betrayed the family and served under Pingyun Planet and later Blue Country.
- Tungwong (Chinese: 銅王): A loyal wargod of Baak family. He is killed by Blue Country's assassins.
- Baak Jing (Chinese: 白 正): the 269th Emperor. He is the eldest brother of Baak Sau. He was killed by Sau to take his throne.
- Mounaam's mother: She is the mother of both Mounaam and Tinkou. She is the official wife of Baak Jing, Sau raped her and she bore Mounaam.
- Baak Saunaam (Chinese: 白 首男): The lord of Baak family 5000 years ago, the first emperor.
- Baak Tingwan (Chinese: 白 千軍): He is the son of Baak Saunaam, and his body is made to the ultimate weapon of Baak family. Unforeseenly, he is still alive.

===== Fung Tribe =====
(Chinese: 風 族; Jyutping: Fungjuk; lit. 'Wind Tribe')

- A small tribe led by Ming Dou, master of Mounaam and Titmaa.

- Ming Dou (Chinese: 明道): The master of Mounaam and Tingou. Before his death, he gives all the rule for the tribe to his dear disciple, Mounaam.

===== Baak Moubin's Group =====
- Baak Moubin (Chinese: 白 無邊): The father of Baak Sau, grandfather of Mounaam. His former title is Hoifu.
- Baak Ngsai (Chinese: 白 五世): The third son of Baak Moubin. His title is his name Ng Sai.
- Baak Tingou (Chinese: 白 天高): Formerly Titmaa (Chinese: 鐵馬), the guardian of Fung tribe. He is actually the son of Baak Jing. His title is his former name Titmaa.

- Later, Daaidou, Laujing and Tinjeun join this group as Moubin's adopted sons.

==== United Nations ====
- Baak Chinbin (Chinese: 白 天變): The fourth younger uncle of Baak Moubin. After the fight against his elder brother Baak Tinlo (Chinese: 白 天羅) (Moubin's father), he retired the title wargod of Baak family and joined the United Nations. Now he is the wargod Yikgon (Chinese: 易筋) of United Nations.

==== Junggik Faction ====
(Chinese: 終極 派; Jyutping: Junggikpaai)

- Title of wargods is Junggik.

- Sinjung (Chinese: 禪宗): The former wargod of Junggik Faction, master of Lausing, Tinjeun, Saamngaan and Hakpaau.
- Lausing (Chinese: 流星): The current wargod of Junggik Faction, the eldest disciple of Sinjung. His name means meteor.
- Tinjeun (Chinese: 天尊): The second disciple of Sinjung. His title is his name Tinjeun.

==== Mouleung Faction ====
(Chinese: 無量 派; Jyutping: Mouleungpaai)

- Title of wargods is Mouleung.

- Daaihoi Mouleung (Chinese: 大海 無量): The wargod of Mouleung Isle, he is the warlord of Southern Sea. Later he adopts Mounaam and makes him his successor. He was later killed by his son, Daaidou, following a long standing grudge.
- Daaihoi Jungwaang (Chinese: 大海 縱橫): The official son of Daaihoi. He hatreds his blood father because he killed his mother. His title is Daaidou (Chinese: 大刀; Jyutping: DaDao). He was defeated and killed by Mou Naam.

- Later, the title wargod of Mouleung is given to Mounaam by Daaihoi.

==== Three-Eyes Tribe ====
(Chinese: 三眼 族; Jyutping: Saamngaanjuk; lit. 'Three-Eyes Tribe')

- Saamngaan (Chinese: 三眼): The third disciple of Sinjung.
- Hakpaau (Chinese: 克 豹): The junior brother of wargod Saamngaan, now is the wargod of Three-Eyes tribe replacing his senior brother. After Saamngaan's death, he succeeds in his position. His title is his name Hakpaau.
- Laino (Chinese: 麗娜): The second lover of Mounaam. She is also Hakpaau's crush.

=== Yut Planet ===
(Chinese: 月毬; Jyutping: Yutkau; lit. 'Moon Planet')

- Nganho (Chinese: 銀河): The wargod of Yut Planet. His name means galaxy.
- Kwongfung (Chinese: 狂風): The eldest disciple of the master of Nganho. His name means hurricane. Later he is revealed as Saat A's second brother.

=== Pingyun Planet ===
(Chinese: 平原星; Jyutping: Pingyunsing; lit. 'Planet of Plain')

- Four Wargods are the four emperors of Pingyun Planet. Their titles following the relation are Dungfong (東方, The Eastern), Saimun (西門, West Gate), Naamtin (南天, South Sky), Bakgik (北極, Northern Pole).

- Naamtin Yauman (Chinese: 南天 優問) & Dungfong Litche (Chinese: 東方 洌車): They are the leaders of the invading forces to Earth. Later, Litche is killed by a powerful man named Saat Ga. Yauman embodies the monster Mosan (Chinese: 魔神; lit. 'Demon god') to become a huge monster, but Mounaam uses his father's ultimate weapon Waimit Jinsan (Chinese: 燬滅 戰神; lit. 'Wargod of Destruction') to destroy him.
- Bakgik Fudai (Chinese: 北極 虎帝): She is Lo Lip (Chinese: 羅 獵), the former wife of Hakpaau.
- Saimun Dakji (Chinese: 西門 得志): His elder brother is killed by Hakpaau while he traveled to Pingyun Planet.

=== Fo Planet ===
(Chinese: 火星; Jyutping: Fosing; lit. 'Planet of Fire (the Mars)')

- Ban Leui (Chinese: 賁雷): The first mutant entity injected the DNA of Earthmen by Saat A.

=== Blue Country ===
(Chinese: 藍國; Jyutping: Laamgwok; lit. 'Blue Country')

- In this planet, the greatest title is not Mousan but Tinwong (Chinese: 天王; lit. 'Heavenly Kings').

- Saat A (Chinese: 殺亞): The lord of Blue Country, leader of the Heavenly Kings.
- Saat Ga (Chinese: 殺家): Younger brother of Saat A. A heavenly king.
- Saat Amtin (Chinese: 殺闇天): The lost son of Saat A.
- Ngan Ling (Chinese: 銀靈): The rumoured woman who is the most beautiful all over the universe ever.
- Geui Sa (Chinese: 巨鯊): The master of Baak Sa (Chinese: 白鯊) and Haak Sa (Chinese: 黑鯊), two of the seven kings. Saat A considers he is the one who has greater power than Saat A himself.

Seven Heavenly Kings (Chinese: 七天王)

== Series ==
Prequels

- Sea Tiger I (海虎I) (about Sea Tiger, the forefather of Baak family)
- Sea Tiger II (海虎II) (about 2 sons of Sea Tiger, Baak Sau-naam and Baak Thu-naam. Baak Thu-naam killed his father and became the Strongest man in the World)
- Sea Tiger III (海虎III) (about 2 sons of Sea Tiger, Baak Sau-naam killed his brother and became the First Emperor)

Warlord

- Warlord (武神)

Sequels

- Warlord: Aero (武神飞天)
- Warlord: Sea Tiger-Hell (武神海虎地狱)
- Warlord: Final (武神终极(Final)) (Story about the Final War of all Wargods)

Sidestories

- Warlord: Hope (武神外传-武神希望)
- Warlord: Gold (武神外传-武神GOLD)
- Warlord: Feisa (武神飞沙)
- Warlord: Baak Gonkwan (武神外传-白乾坤) about Baak Gonkwan, the 230th generation Sea Tiger wargod, The greatest Sea Tiger Wargod of Baak Royal Family.
- Heavenly Sword (武神外传-天王剑) about Baak Batin, the 250th generation of Sea Tiger wargod. Who Forged two great Swords.
- Tingwan Warlord (武神前传-灭世之战) (about Baak Tingwan)
- Warlord: 108
- Warlord: Phoenix (Story about Fungwong -Phoenix-, The Greatest Wargod 200,000 years after the age of Baak Mou-Naam)
- Hero & Samurai
