= 刀 (disambiguation) =

刀 is the Kangxi radical 18.

刀 may also refer to:

- Dao (sword), a category of single-edge Chinese swords primarily used for slashing and chopping
- Japanese sword
  - Katana, a type of single-edged Japanese sword used by samurai
- The Blade, a 1995 Hong Kong film
- A Chinese slang term for the United States dollar

== See also ==
- 剣 (disambiguation)
