= Pak Tai To Yan =

Mountain in Hong Kong

- 北大刀屻
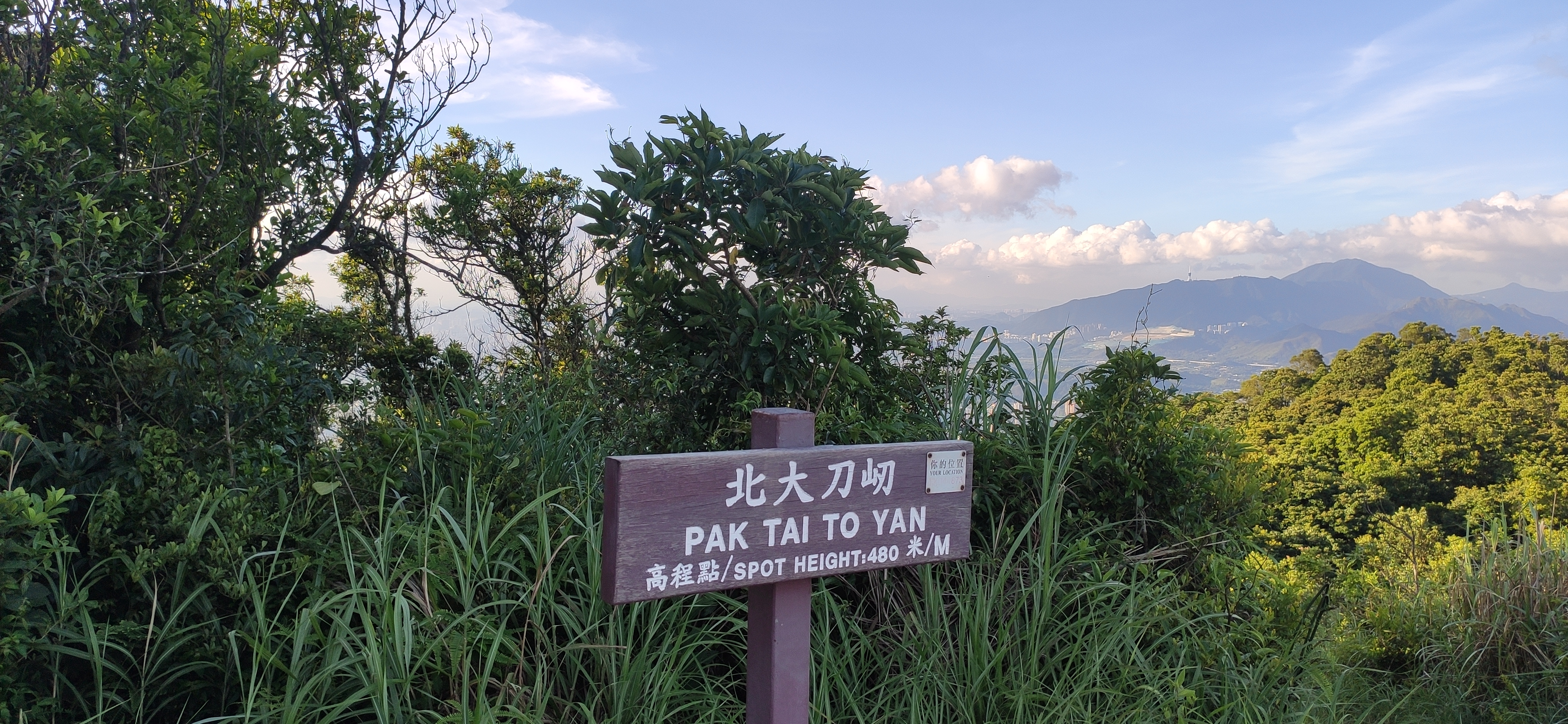
- Pak Tai To Yan Summit

Highest point
- Elevation: 480 m (1,570 ft)
- Coordinates: 22°27′59.8″N 114°7′40.9″E

Geography
- Location within Hong Kong
- Location: Hong Kong

Pak Tai To Yan (Chinese: 北大刀屻) is a mountain in northern Hong Kong near Fanling. It is close to a similarly named peak called Tai To Yan. Pak Tai To Yan is 480 metres tall.

== Geography ==
On the northern foot of this mountain, the largest cemetery in Hong Kong, Wo Hop Shek Public Cemetery, is built.

== Access ==
Pak Tai To Yan is in Lam Tsuen Country Park in northern Hong Kong. It is hiked as part of the Razors Edge Ridge Hike which brings hikers to both Pak Tai To Yan and nearby Tai To Yan. Hikers can start their hike near Kadoorie Farm and finish a few hours later at Fanling MTR station or Wah Ming Estate Bus Terminus.

== See also ==
- List of mountains, peaks and hills in Hong Kong
- Tai To Yan
