= Tai To Yan =

Mountain in Lam Tsuen Country Park, Hong Kong

- 大刀屻
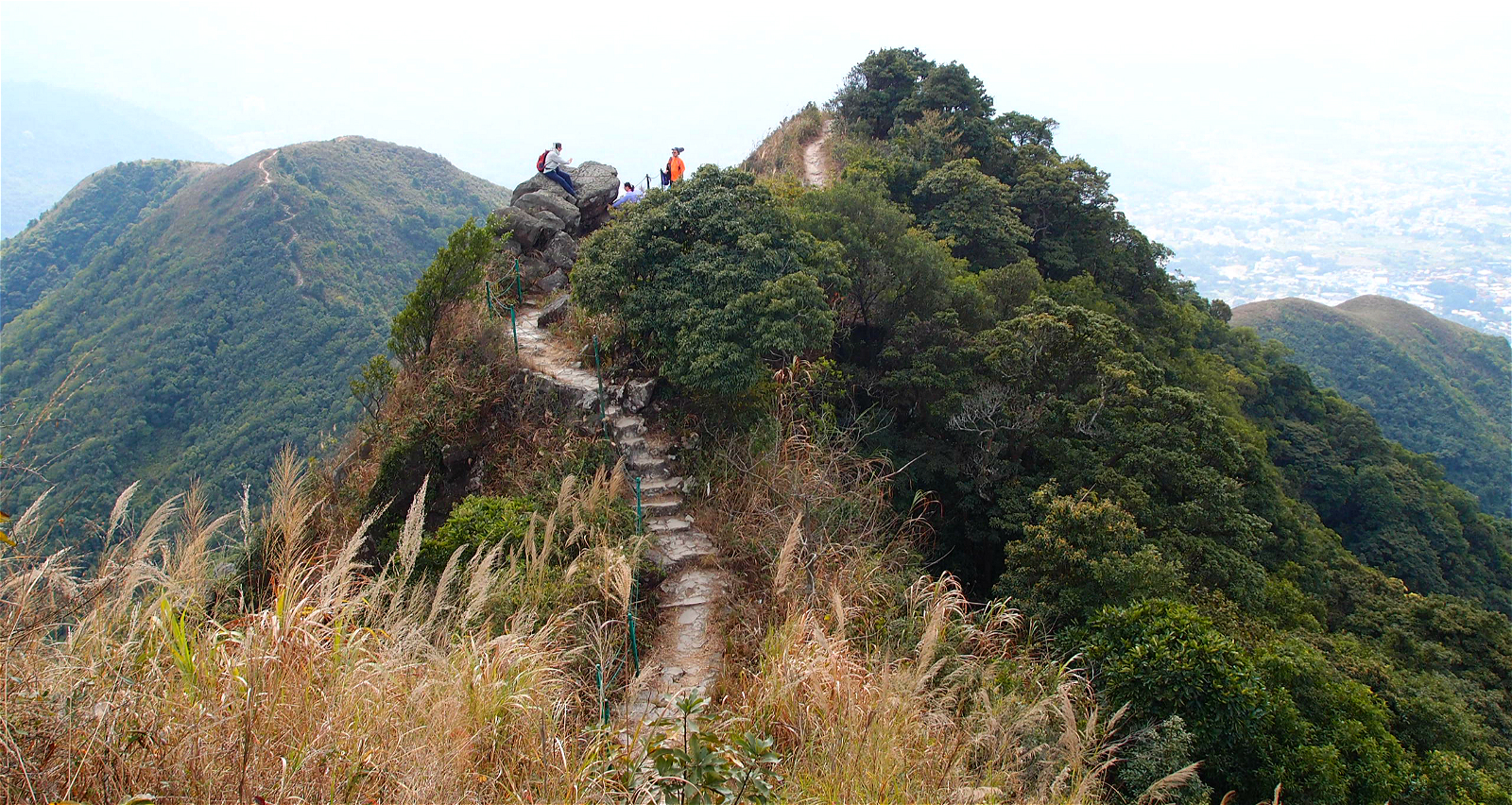
- Ridge of Tai To Yan

Highest point
- Elevation: 566 m (1,857 ft); HKPD
- Coordinates: 22°27′0.92″N 114°7′5.24″E

Geography
- Location within Hong Kong
- Location: Hong Kong

Tai To Yan (Chinese: 大刀屻) is a mountain that lies in northern Hong Kong near Fanling. It is close to a similarly named peak called Pak Tai To Yan.

== Geography ==
Tai To Yan is 566 metres tall and is the tallest mountain in the nearby area.

== Access ==
Tai To Yan is in the Lam Tsuen Country Park in northern Hong Kong. It is hiked as part of the Razors Edge Ridge Hike which brings hikers to both Tai To Yan (566 m) and nearby Pak Tai To Yan (480 m). Hikers can start their hike near Kadoorie Farm and finish a few hours later at Fanling MTR station or Wah Ming Estate Bus Terminus.

== See also ==
- List of mountains, peaks and hills in Hong Kong
- Lam Tsuen Country Park
