= Tito Gómez (painter) =

Cuban painter

Tito Gómez (born Juan Antonio Gómez Gutiérrez in 1953 in Havana, Cuba) is a Cuban painter.

He studied at the Escuela Nacional de Bellas Artes "San Alejandro" and then the "Instituto de Diseno", both in Havana. At the latter he won the graphic arts top prize.

He worked as a designer, which included creating the logo of Cubana de Aviación and posters for hospitals. In his spare time, he created paintings. In 1997, he became an independent artist.

After moving to Miami, Florida, he became a full-time painter.

He has had exhibitions in Cuba, the Netherlands, Switzerland, the United States and France and has also had his work exhibited in Spain and Italy.
