= Kai Kung Shan (Sai Kung District) =

Hill in Sai Kung, Hong Kong

- 雞公山
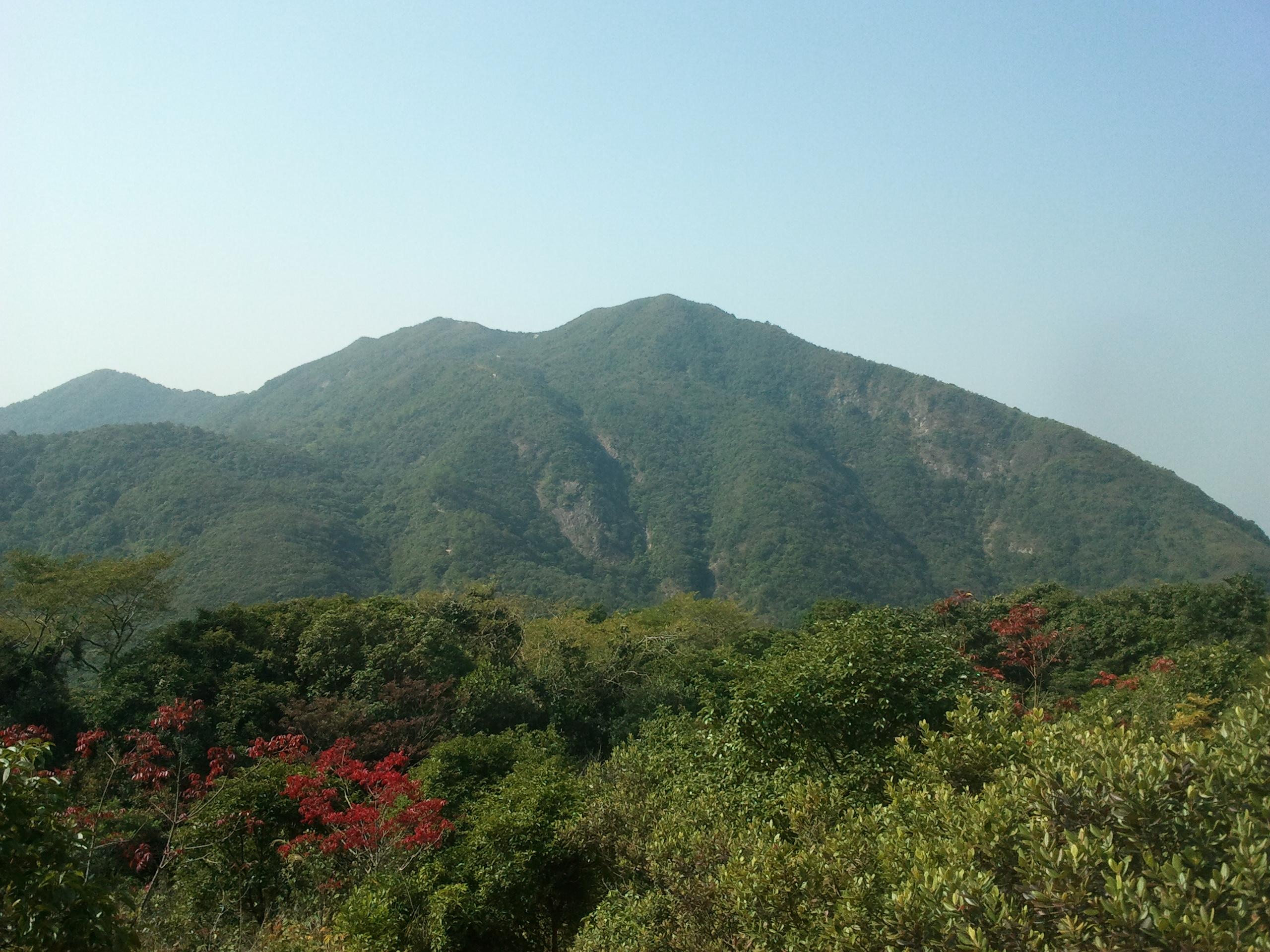
- View of Kai Kung Shan

Highest point
- Elevation: 399 m (1,309 ft)
- Coordinates: 22°25′00″N 114°17′28″E

Geography
- Location within Hong Kong
- Location: Sai Kung Country Park, Hong Kong

Kai Kung Shan (Chinese: 雞公山) is a mountain that lies within the western part of Sai Kung Peninsula in northeastern Hong Kong. Its summit is 399 metres (1,309 ft) above sea level. Stage 3 of the MacLehose Trail traverses this mountain.

== See also ==
- List of mountains, peaks and hills in Hong Kong
- Sai Kung Country Park
