= Fanling–Sheung Shui New Town =

Fanling-Sheung Shui New Town 粉嶺／上水新市鎮
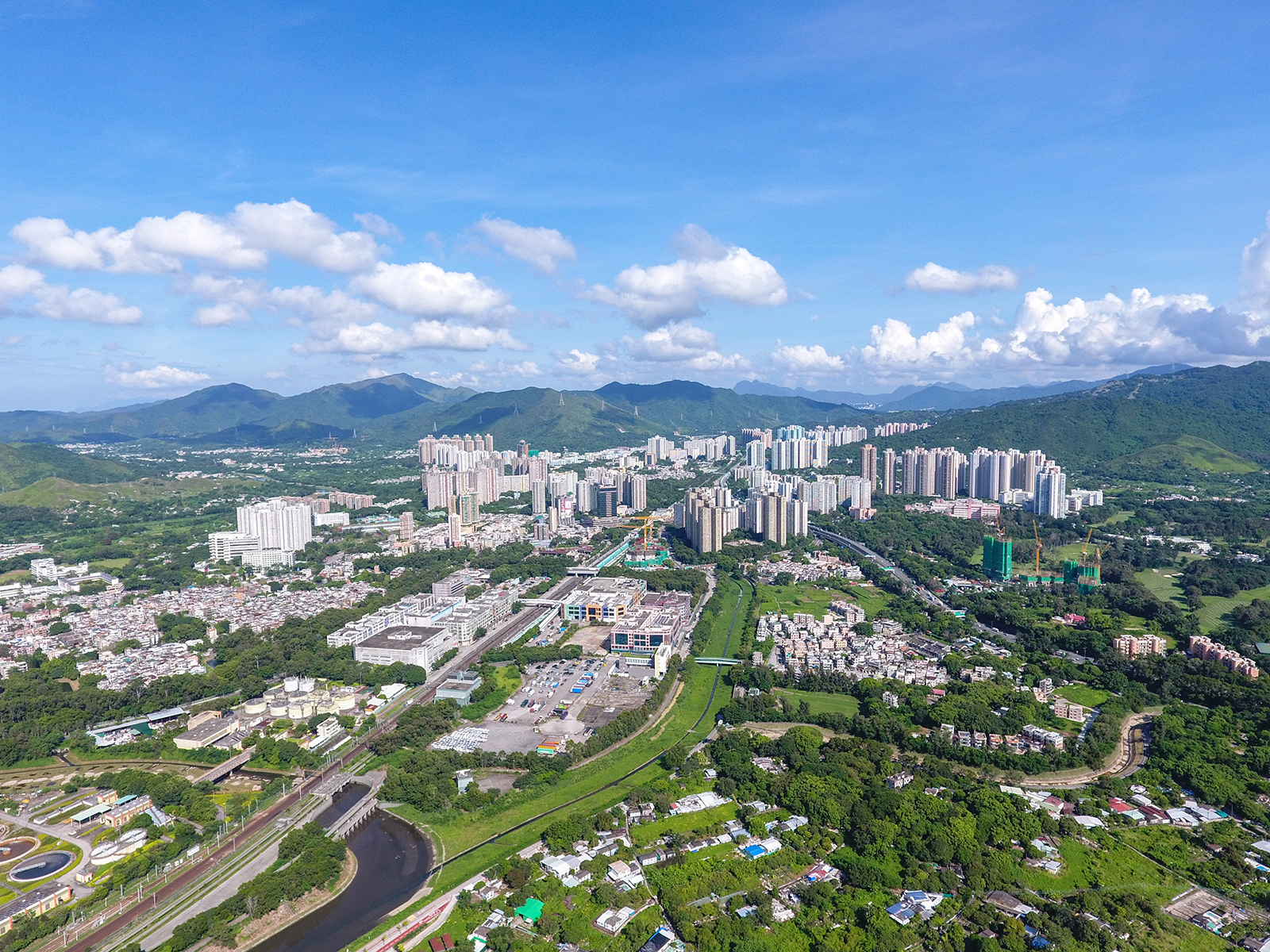
- Nickname: Fanling-Sheung Shui
- Interactive map of Fanling-Sheung Shui New Town
- Country: China
- SAR: Hong Kong
- Region: New Territories
- District: North District

Area
  - Total: 7.8 km^{2} (3.0 sq mi)

Population (2012)
  - Total: 255,000
  - Density: 33,000/km^{2} (85,000/sq mi)

Fanling–Sheung Shui New Town
- Traditional Chinese: 粉嶺／上水新市鎮
Transcriptions
Yue: Cantonese
- Yale Romanization: Fán léhng - seuhng séui sān síh jan
- Jyutping: Fan2 leng5 - soeng6 soei2 san1 si5 yan3

Fanling-Sheung Shui New Town was developed from the traditional market towns (Luen Wo Hui and Shek Wu Hui) and villages around Fanling and Sheung Shui, within the present-day North District in the New Territories of Hong Kong. It was primarily developed in the mid 1980s. Connecting Fanling and Sheung Shui is an U-shaped main road called Ma Sik Road.

The new town presently has a population of 247,000, with an ultimate capacity of 264,000 upon full development. The total development area is about 780 hectares (7.8 square kilometres; 3.0 square miles) which includes residential, commercial, industrial, social, community and recreation facilities.

== Housing ==
=== Fanling Town ===
Name		Type	Inaug.	No Blocks	No Units
Cheung Wah Estate	祥華邨	TPS	1984	10	2,471
Ka Fuk Estate	嘉福邨	Public	1994	3	2,045
Wah Ming Estate	華明邨	Public	1990	7	2,476
Wah Sum Estate	華心邨	Public	1995	2	1,481
Yung Shing Court	雍盛苑	TPS	2000	2	1,729

=== Sheung Shui Town ===
Name		Type	Inaug.	No Blocks	No Units	Notes
Ching Ho Estate	清河邨	Public	2006	3	2,397	
Choi Yuen Estate	彩園邨	Public	1982	6	5,076	
Tai Ping Estate	太平邨	TPS	1989	4	424	
Tin Ping Estate	天平邨	TPS	1986	7	1,522	

== Community ==
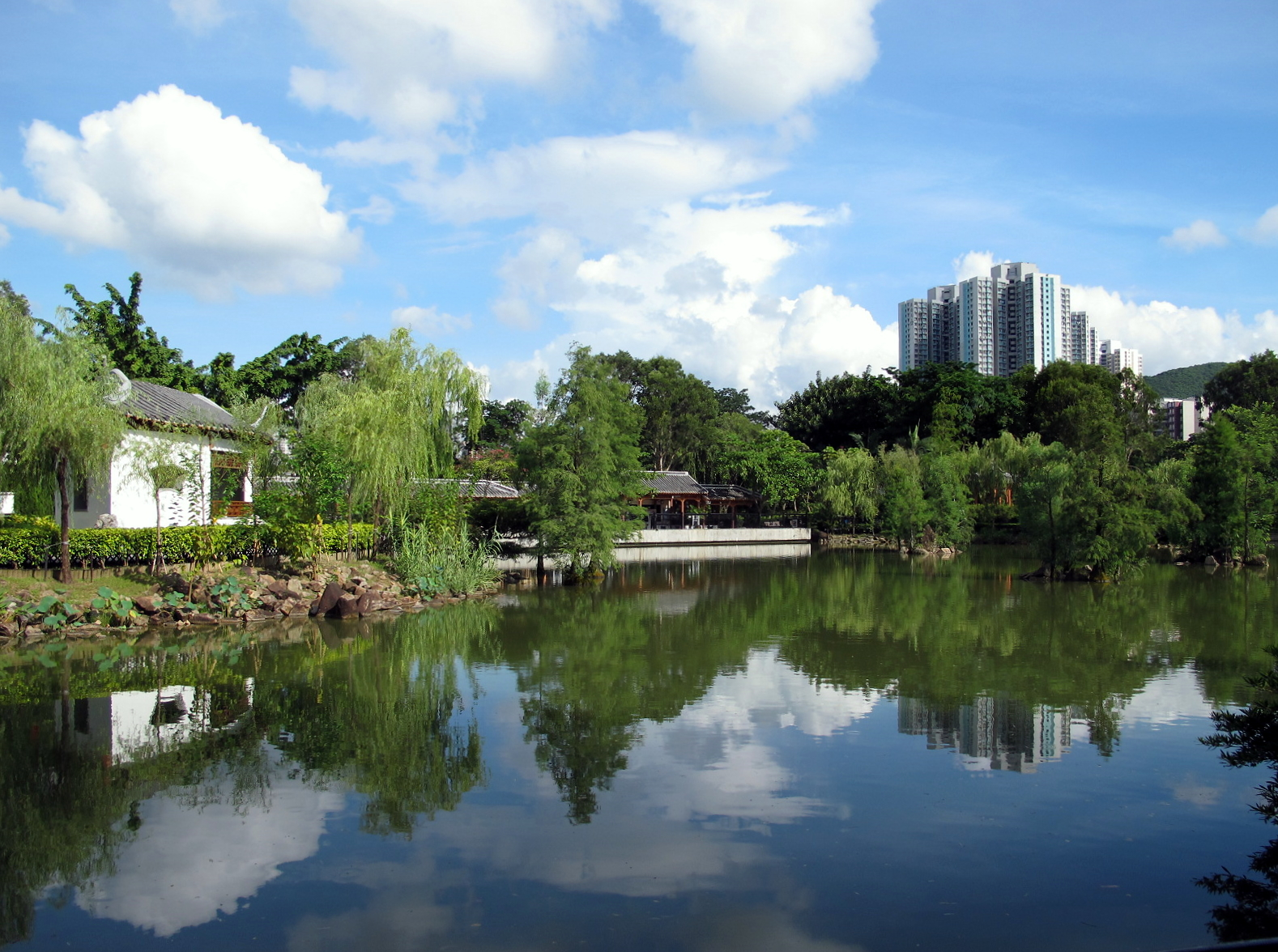
North District Park

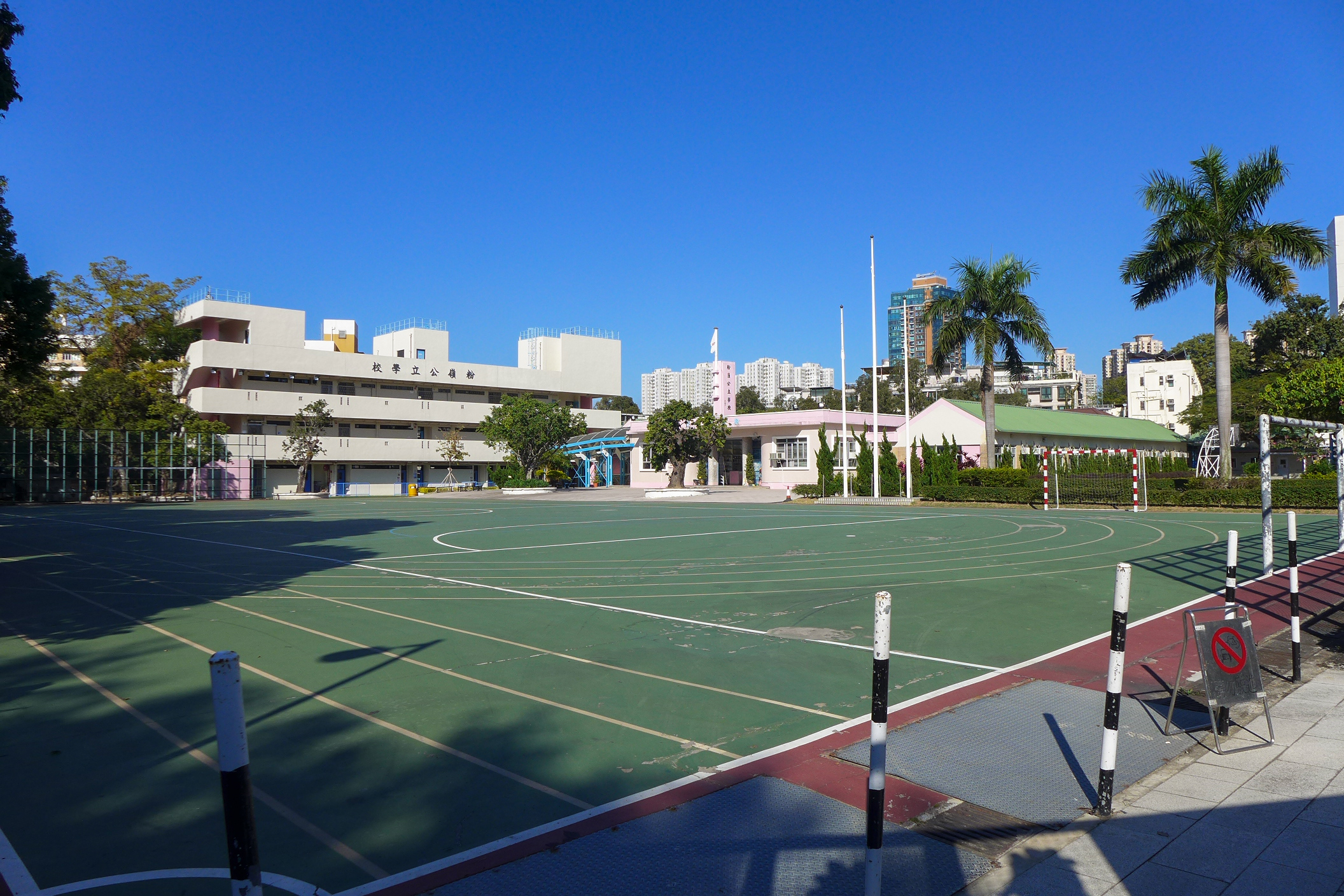
Fanling Public School

- North District Town Hall 22.50166°N 114.12895°E
- North District Park 22.49830°N 114.13423°E

=== Schools ===
- Fanling Public School
- Lee Chi Tat Memorial School

=== Hospitals ===
- North District Hospital 22.49684°N 114.12443°E
- Hong Chi Fanling Integrative Rehabilitation Complex (C&A Home) (formerly Fanling Hospital) 22.50064°N 114.13718°E

=== Shopping centres ===
- Landmark North
- Metropolis Plaza

== Transport ==
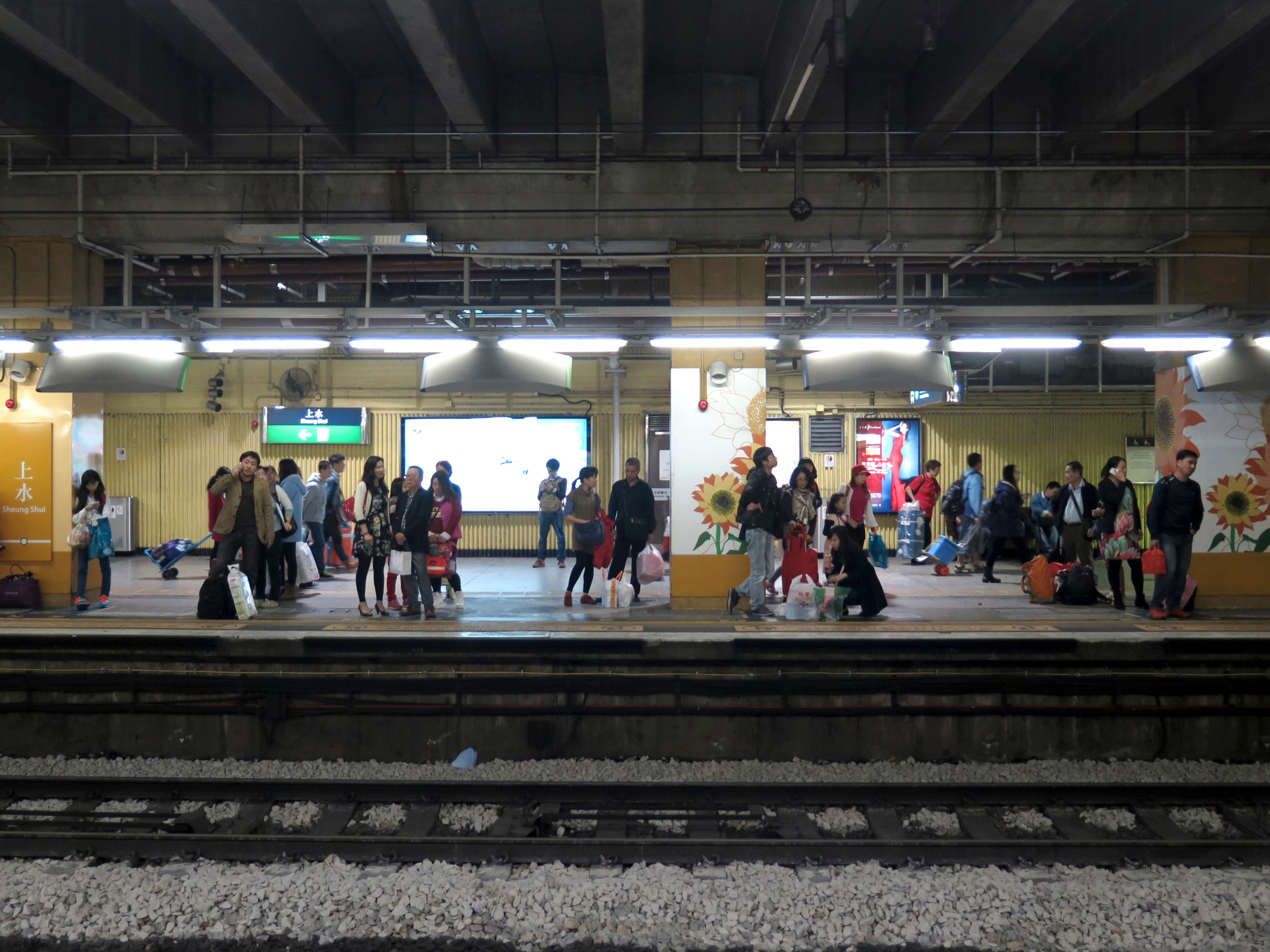
Sheung Shui station

The new town is served by the Fanling, and Sheung Shui stations of the MTR East Rail line, which connects the new town with Kowloon and the border with mainland China at Lo Wu.

The Fanling Highway is a part of Route 9. Other major roads include the Jockey Club Road and San Wan Road.

== See also ==
- List of buildings, sites and areas in Hong Kong
